= Regional Natural Park of the Ardennes =

French regional natural park

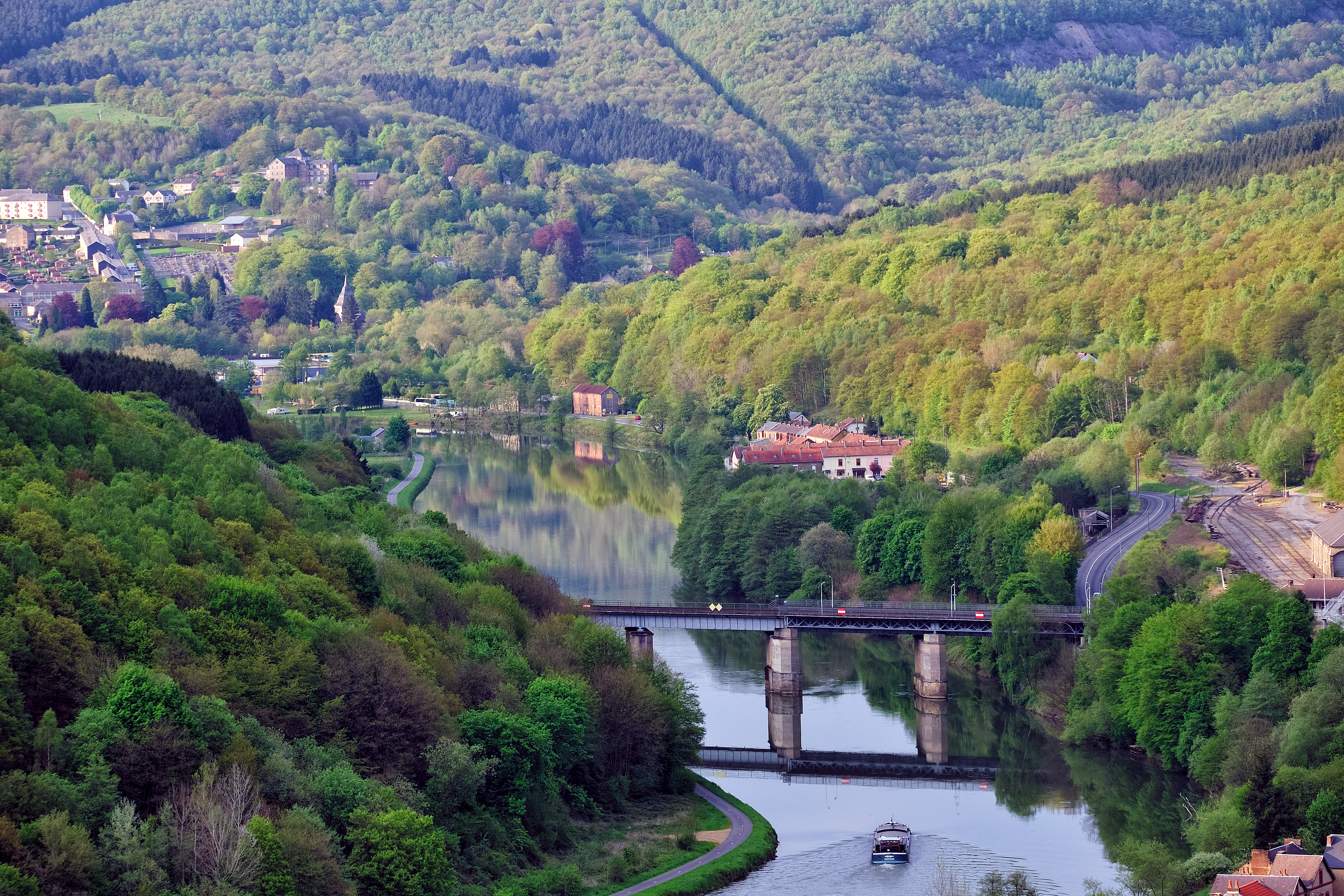
- The Meuse valley, Monthermé.

- Location within France
- Location: Ardennes, Grand Est, France
- Coordinates: 49°54′N 4°39′E
- Width: 1,160 km (720 mi)
- Max. elevation: Croix Scaille
- Established: December 21, 2011
- Website: www.parc-naturel-ardennes.fr

The Regional Natural Park of the Ardennes (PNR Ardennes) is a regional natural park established on December 21, 2011, encompassing approximately 116,000 hectares of the Ardennes department.

Following a lengthy gestation period and numerous discussions regarding the merits of this designation, it encompasses 92 municipalities and 76,000 inhabitants. It occupies 22% of the surface area of the Ardennes department. Charleville-Mézières, the prefecture of the Ardennes, holds the status of a gateway city associated with the park.

This territory is distinguished by the coexistence of rural and forestry traditions alongside a manufacturing tradition, which collectively accounts for 36% of the department's industrial jobs. From a geological perspective, the region represents a transition zone with a remarkable diversity of landscapes and a rich natural heritage. This includes 54 areas of ecological, faunal, and floral interest, as well as seven Natura 2000 sites, forests, peat bogs, heathlands, dry grasslands, slate quarries, rocky cliffs, deep valleys, and bocages. The area is rich in legend and conflict, functioning as a border zone where numerous disputes have arisen. The region's architectural heritage reflects its history, landscapes, and geology, featuring limestone from Thiérache, blue stone from Givet, half-timbered houses, fortified churches, medieval citadels, and castles, as well as industrial buildings and villages that bear witness to ironworking and the history of ironmasters.

== History of the park ==
The concept of a natural park in the Ardennes region originated in the 1960s. Just two months after the decree establishing regional natural parks was published in March 1967, Christophe Ryelandt, in the Ardennes literary and artistic journal La Grive, proposed the creation of a "natural park of the Ardennes forest", with a particular focus on the northern part of the department and extending into Belgium. This cross-border park project was inspired by the imminent creation of the "High Fens-Eifel Nature Park" between Belgium and Germany. The project was based on the premise that natural parks should serve as protected areas for relaxation and tourism. From October 1968 to June 1969, a series of meetings were held between the prefect of the Ardennes, Pierre Brunon, the governor of the Namur province, René Closse, and local elected officials to establish a Franco-Belgian natural park. As reported by Le Monde, the project ultimately failed due to significant discrepancies between the Belgian and French Ardennes. While the Belgian Ardennes was already well-developed for tourism, the French Ardennes remained primarily industrial. French industrialists expressed concern that the park would impede their operations, a sentiment that was further exacerbated by those of hunters.

In early 1977, at the request of the Champagne-Ardenne region, a further study was conducted on the potential creation of a park in the northern Ardennes. An information campaign and consultation process were organized, with clear communication that the park would not interfere with agricultural, forestry, or industrial development, and that hunting and fishing would continue as usual under existing regulations. However, more than this communication was needed to satisfy the growing environmentalist movement. Guy Féquant, vice-president of the Departmental Society for the Protection of Nature and the Environment, published an op-ed in Le Monde in which he criticized the regional natural parks for frequently exploiting nature rather than protecting it. As a result, the project was once again placed on hold.

The concept was revived in the 1990s, spearheaded by Michel Sobanska, the mayor of Rocroi. In 1999, an association was established with the objective of prefiguration of the regional natural park in the Ardennes. The regional natural park was now regarded as a supplementary instrument for economic and social development, and a means of safeguarding the area's distinctive character. A preliminary public consultation was conducted in 2005, the results of which contributed to the formulation of the project charter. In September 2006, the paleontologist Yves Coppens, married to a woman from Signy-l'Abbaye, became the project's sponsor. In 2007, the Ministry of Ecology issued an intermediate favorable opinion. In early 2010, the prefiguration association was superseded by a joint association, the financial support for which was provided by the regional and departmental authorities. A public inquiry commenced on January 5, 2011, and concluded in early February. After eleven years, the decree creating France's 47th regional natural park was signed on December 21, 2011, by Prime Minister François Fillon. The park became the third in the Champagne-Ardenne region, after the Forêt d'Orient and Montagne de Reims parks. It was inaugurated on January 25, 2012, by the Minister of Ecology, Sustainable Development, Transport, and Housing, Nathalie Kosciusko-Morizet.

== Park operations ==
=== Boundaries, missions, and actions ===
A total of ninety-one municipalities initially endorsed the park's charter for twelve years, with the municipalities being distributed across nine different cantons. These include Fumay, Givet, Monthermé, Nouzonville, Renwez, Revin, Rocroi, Rumigny, and Signy-le-Petit. On March 1, 2019, the municipality of Aouste was added to this list, bringing the total number of municipalities to 92.

Position and surface area of the park within the Ardennes department.

The mixed syndicate responsible for the park management has been based in Renwez since November 2019. The park's principal missions, as delineated in the 2011-2023 charter, are as follows:

- Diversifying the local economy by promoting territorial resources, with initial efforts directed at developing tourism and implementing a forestry charter balancing economic and environmental concerns.
- Preserving the rich natural and landscape heritage while supporting environmental transitions, including monitoring the expansion of the Charleville-Mézières agglomeration, identifying future activity zones, cleaning and rehabilitating former industrial sites, managing the ecological network (green and blue infrastructure), and maintaining Natura 2000 sites within the park. The park also focuses on species inventory, monitoring, and climate-energy planning.
- Promoting the identity and quality of life in the Ardennes through monitoring service and housing quality, advising individuals on building renovations, fostering community and cultural activities, reinforcing local identity, encouraging cross-border cooperation with Belgium, and collaborating with neighboring regions.
- Ensuring the park's proper functioning by establishing a team of project managers and administrative staff, organizing a territorial conference, assembling a scientific council, maintaining relationships with the "Friends of the Park" association, setting up monitoring and evaluation mechanisms, installing signage, and managing communication efforts.

Communes of the Ardennes Regional Nature Park at its creation in December 2011
List of communes: Anchamps, Antheny, Aouste, Arreux, Aubigny-les-Pothées, Aubrives, Auge, Auvillers-les-Forges, Blanchefosse-et-Bay, Blombay, Bogny-sur-Meuse, Bossus-lès-Rumigny, Bourg-Fidèle, Brognon, Cernion, Champlin, Charnois, Le Châtelet-sur-Sormonne, Chilly, Chooz, Cliron, Deville, L'Échelle, Estrebay, Etalle, Eteignieres, Fépin, La Férée, Flaignes-Havys, Fligny, Foisches, Le Fréty, Fromelennes, Fumay, Gespunsart, Girondelle, Givet, Gué-d'Hossus, Ham-les-Moines, Ham-sur-Meuse, Hannapes, Harcy, Hargnies, Haudrecy, Haulmé, Les Hautes-Rivières, Haybes, Hierges, Joigny-sur-Meuse, Laifour, Landrichamps, Laval-Morency, Lépron-les-Vallées, Liart, Logny-Bogny, Lonny, Marby, Marlemont, Maubert-Fontaine, Les Mazures, Montcornet, Monthermé, Montigny-sur-Meuse, Murtin-et-Bogny, Neufmanil, La Neuville-aux-Joutes, Neuville-lez-Beaulieu, Nouzonville, Prez, Rancennes, Regniowez, Remilly-les-Pothées, Renwez, Revin, Rimogne, Rocroi, Rouvroy-sur-Audry, Rumigny, Saint-Marcel, Sécheval, Sévigny-la-Forêt, Signy-le-Petit, Sormonne, Taillette, Tarzy, Thilay, Tournavaux, Tournes, Tremblois-lès-Rocroi, Vaux-Villaine, Vireux-Molhain and Vireux-Wallerand.

=== Governance and management structures ===
The committee of the mixed syndicate managing the Regional Natural Park of the Ardennes is responsible for making major decisions about the budget, staffing, statutes, and guidelines. The committee is constituted by representatives from the 92 member municipalities, the Champagne-Ardenne Regional Council, the Ardennes General Council, the park's gateway city, and the inter-municipal cooperation establishments (EPCIs) within the park's boundaries. Additionally, the committee includes many advisory members, such as representatives from the Regional Economic, Social, and Environmental Council and the "Friends of the Park" association. The executive board, comprising 15 members elected from within the committee, is responsible for the daily management of the Regional Natural Park of the Ardennes. The board is chaired by Jean-Marie Meunier, who is also a regional councilor for the Ardennes and president of the park. The "Friends of the Park" association, which includes members of civil society, supported local officials during the park's prefiguration phase. The association's objective is to amplify the voices of the region's residents and users.

The 2012 operational budget was €1,115,125, which is in stark contrast to the average operational budget of €2,300,000 for a PNR in France. The Ardennes PNR was established during a period of reduced state financial support, and it relies on a team comprising administrative staff and seven project managers who specialize in areas defined by the charter. The team operates under the guidance of PNR President Jean-Marie Meunier and Director Isabelle Zarlenga, in conjunction with the executive board.

== Geology ==
If we consider the scale of geological time, beginning with the most ancient periods, the initial massifs that emerged during the Cambrian era gave rise to the slate schists of Rimogne, the phyllades of Bogny and its black phyllites, and the slate formations of Fumay.

During the Devonian period, a significant portion of the Ardennes territory was submerged in a relatively shallow, tranquil marine environment, conducive to the accumulation of sediments. This period is distinguished by the initial occurrence of a markedly calcareous marine sediment (coral reefs). The resulting limestone ridge of Givet forms a natural boundary that has long served as a frontier. The Nichet Cave in Fromelennes, formed in a limestone deposit from this time, stands as a striking testimony to this geological history. Givet gave its name to one of the geological stages of the Devonian, the Givetian, described by geologist Jules Gosselet.

From the Lower Devonian to the Carboniferous, and subsequently to the Permian, the Ardennes Massif, the westernmost component of the Hercynian chain, emerged from the depths. As a result of the massif's repeated uplifting, a series of plateaus and peaks were formed in the vicinity of Sedan, along with Rocroi and Namur. These formations left behind basins between them, which subsequently filled with sedimentary deposits.

At the base of the Ardennes Massif, along a band extending from Signy-le-Petit and Rumigny to Renwez and Warnecourt, the Lias Sea deposited layers of sand, clay, and limestone, which were later inhabited by large reptiles. Subsequently, the sea retreated once more, but it subsequently returned, depositing sand, clay, and the gypsum of the infra-Cretaceous. As the waters receded, the animals that inhabited the land became more evolved.

During the Cenozoic era, the uplift of the Alps had a significant impact on this territory, resulting in the fracturing or folding of certain sedimentary layers. This was followed by the major deluges, which led to the erosion of the peaks by runoff. The formation of valleys and gorges, in particular, was shaped by the actions of the Meuse and the Semois rivers.

== Geography ==
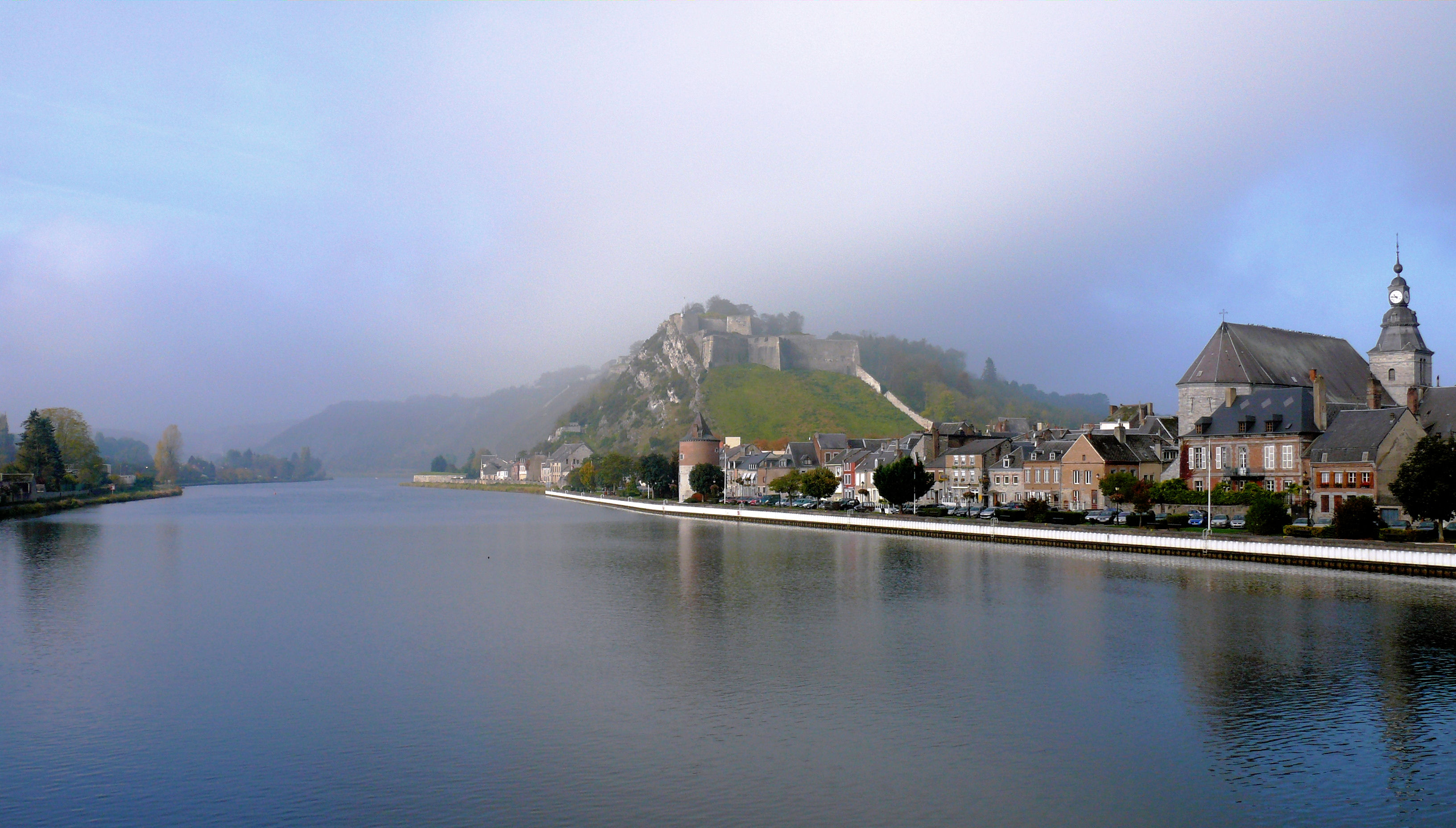
View of the Meuse valley at Givet.

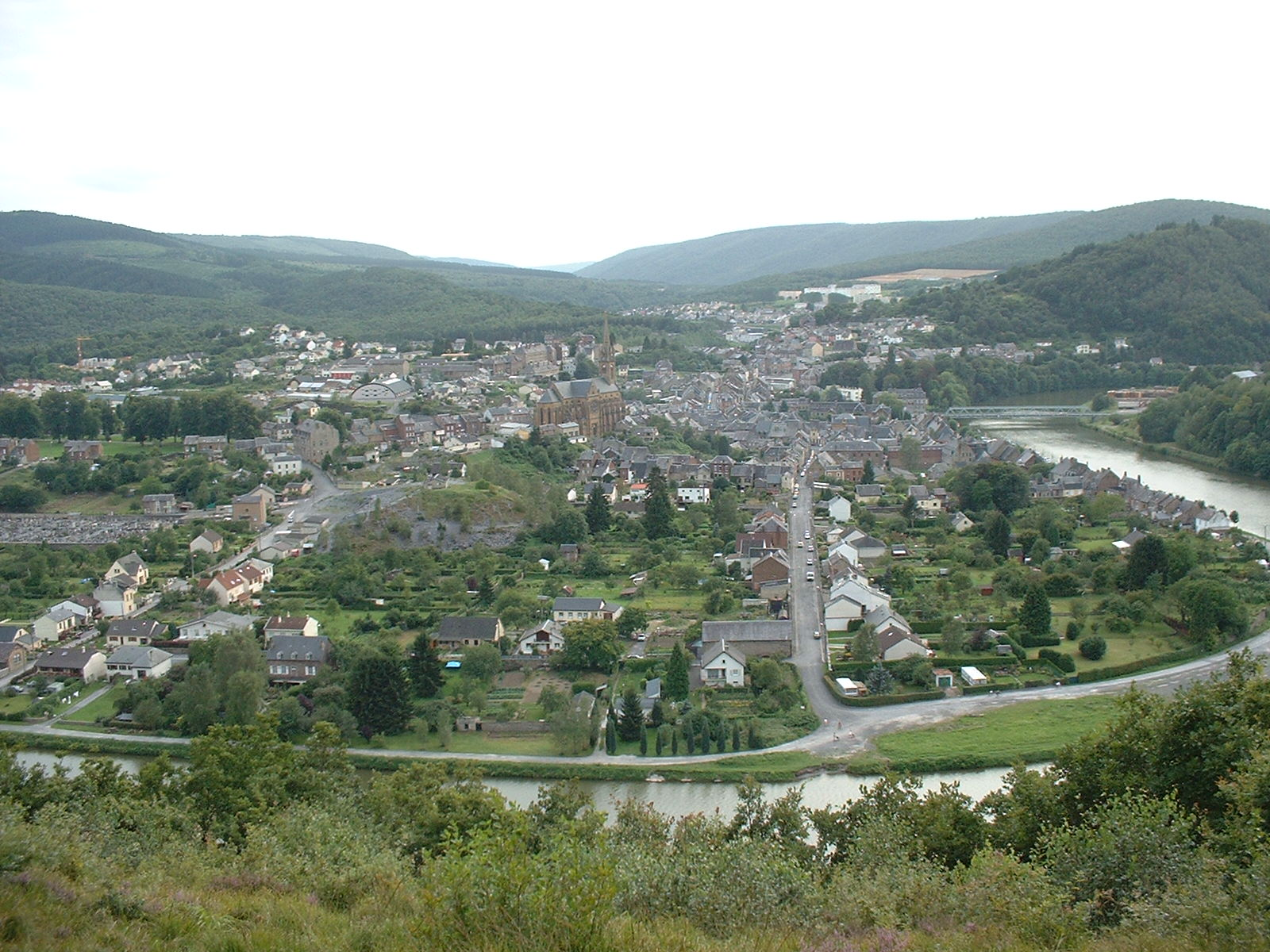
Fumay seen from the Meuse loop.

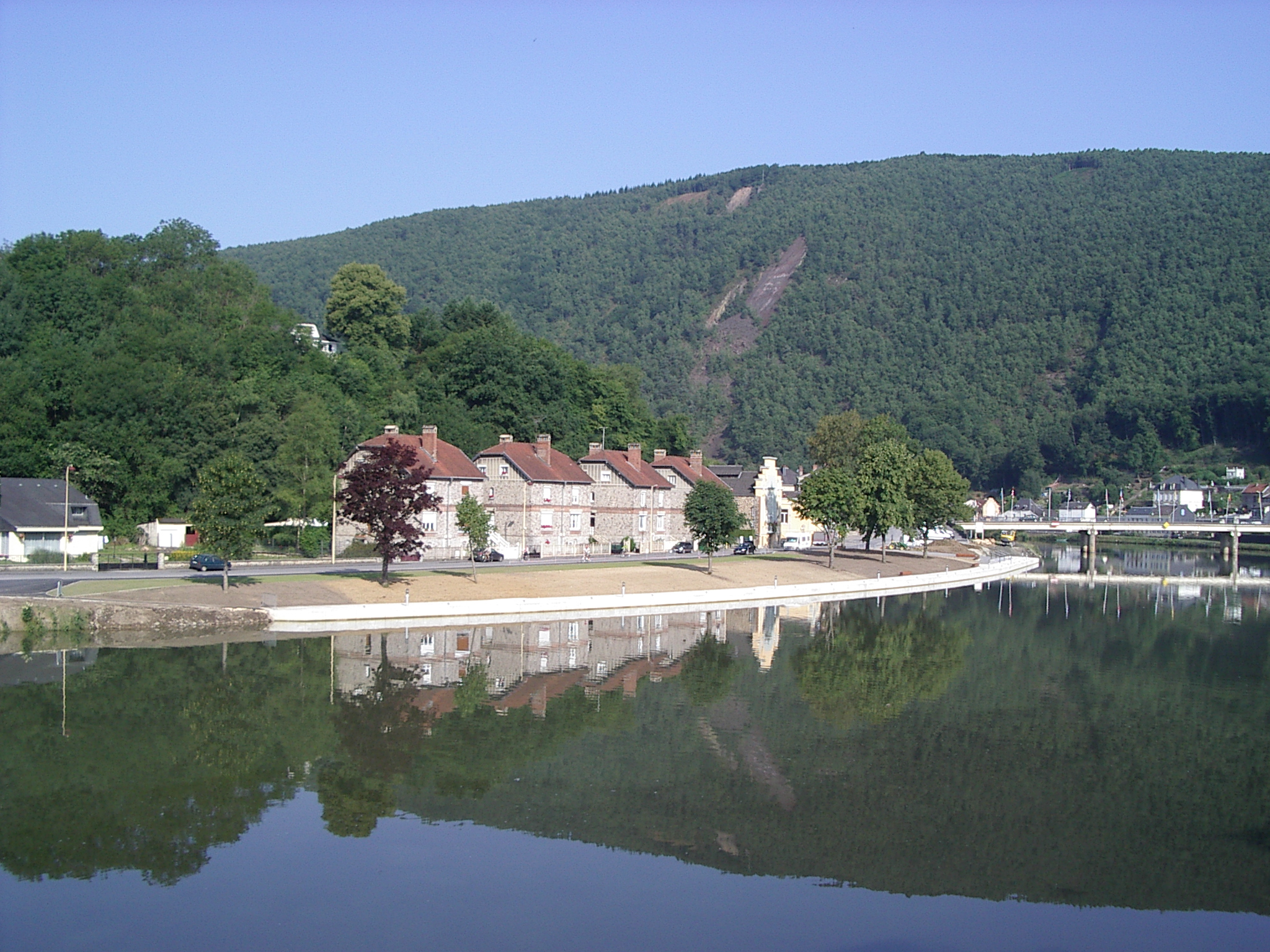
River port of Monthermé.

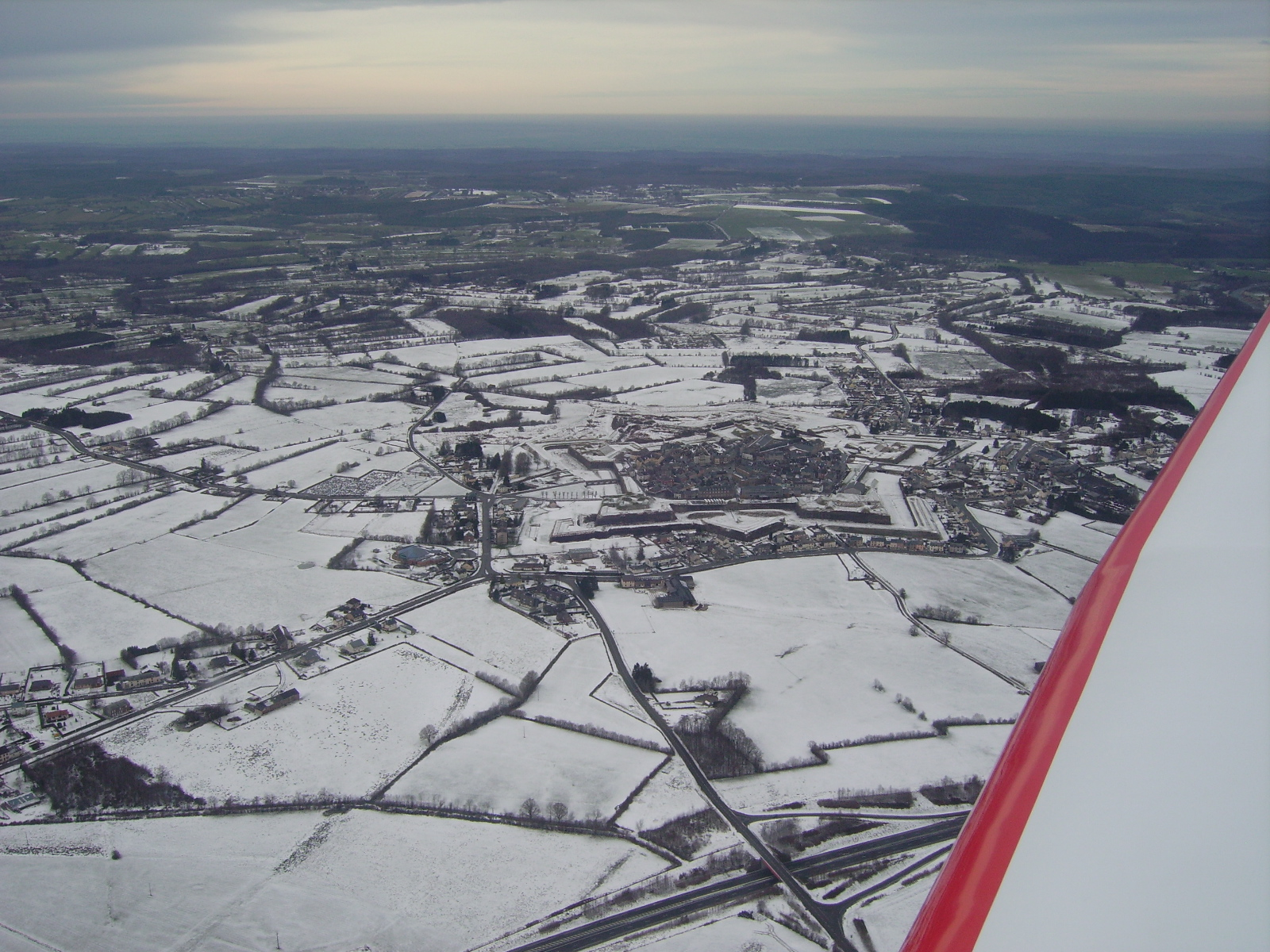
Rocroi Plateau in the snow.

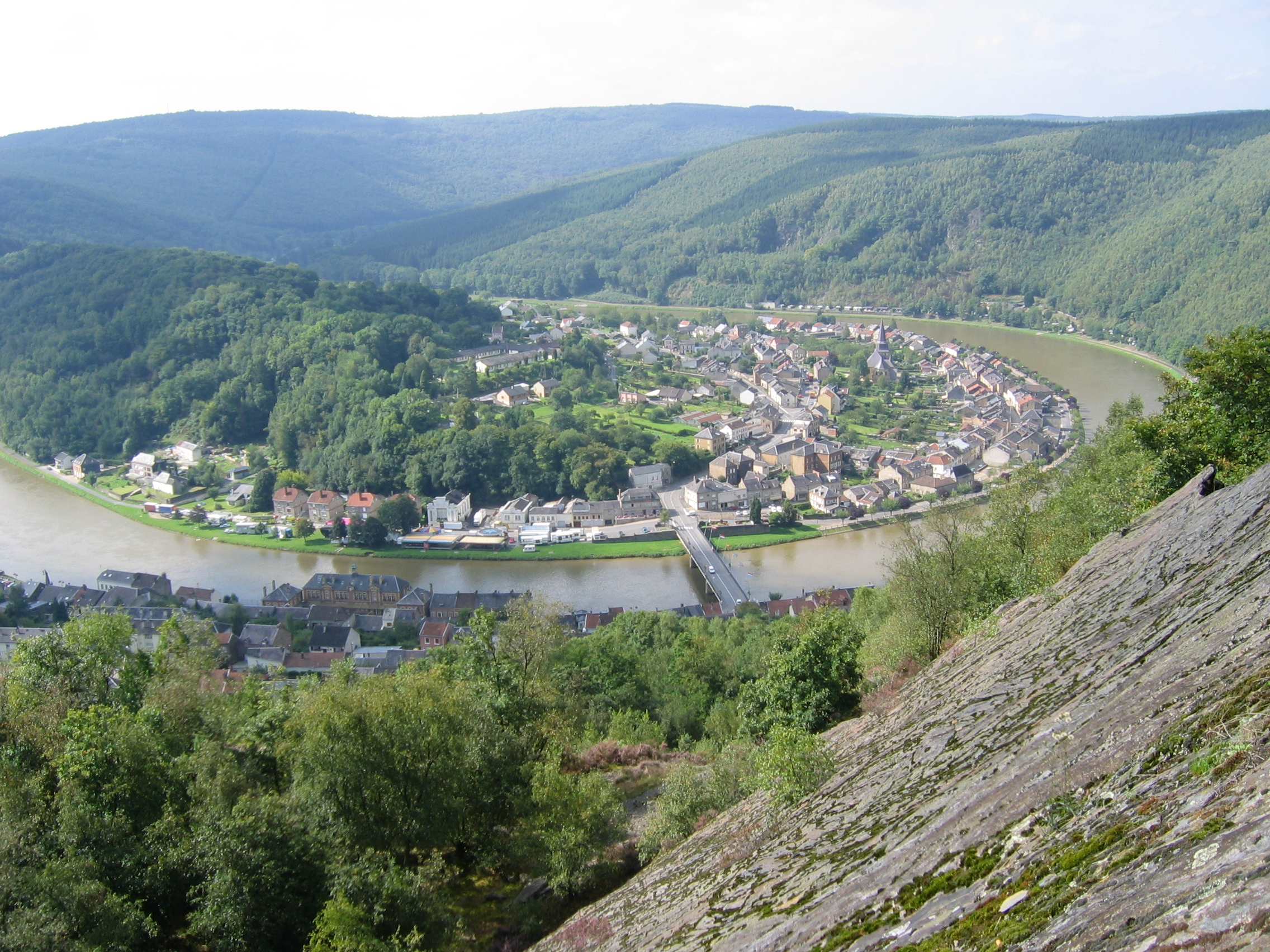
Slate quarries in the foreground, Monthermé.

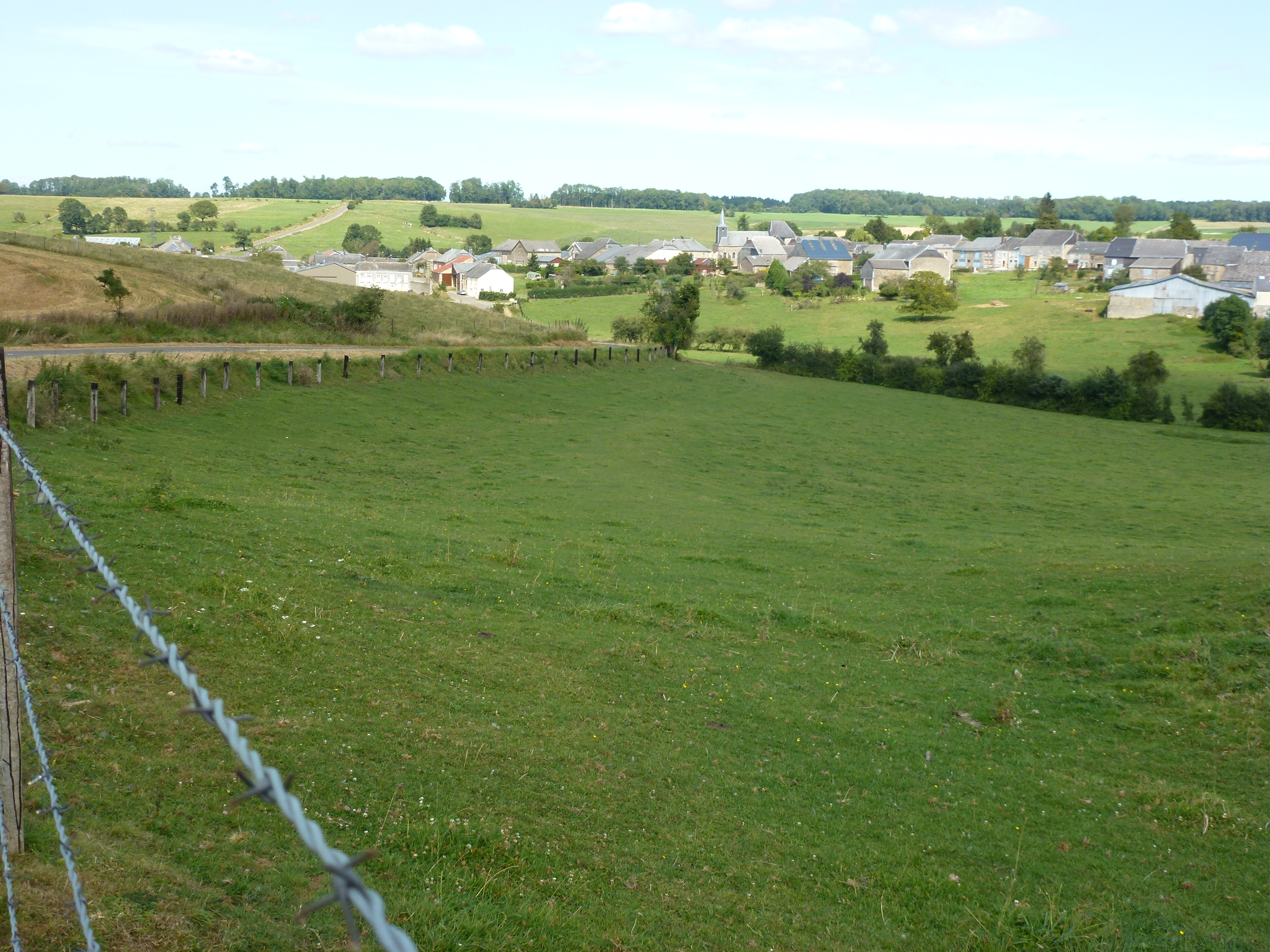
Landscape overlooking the village of Flaignes-Havys in the Sormonne valley.

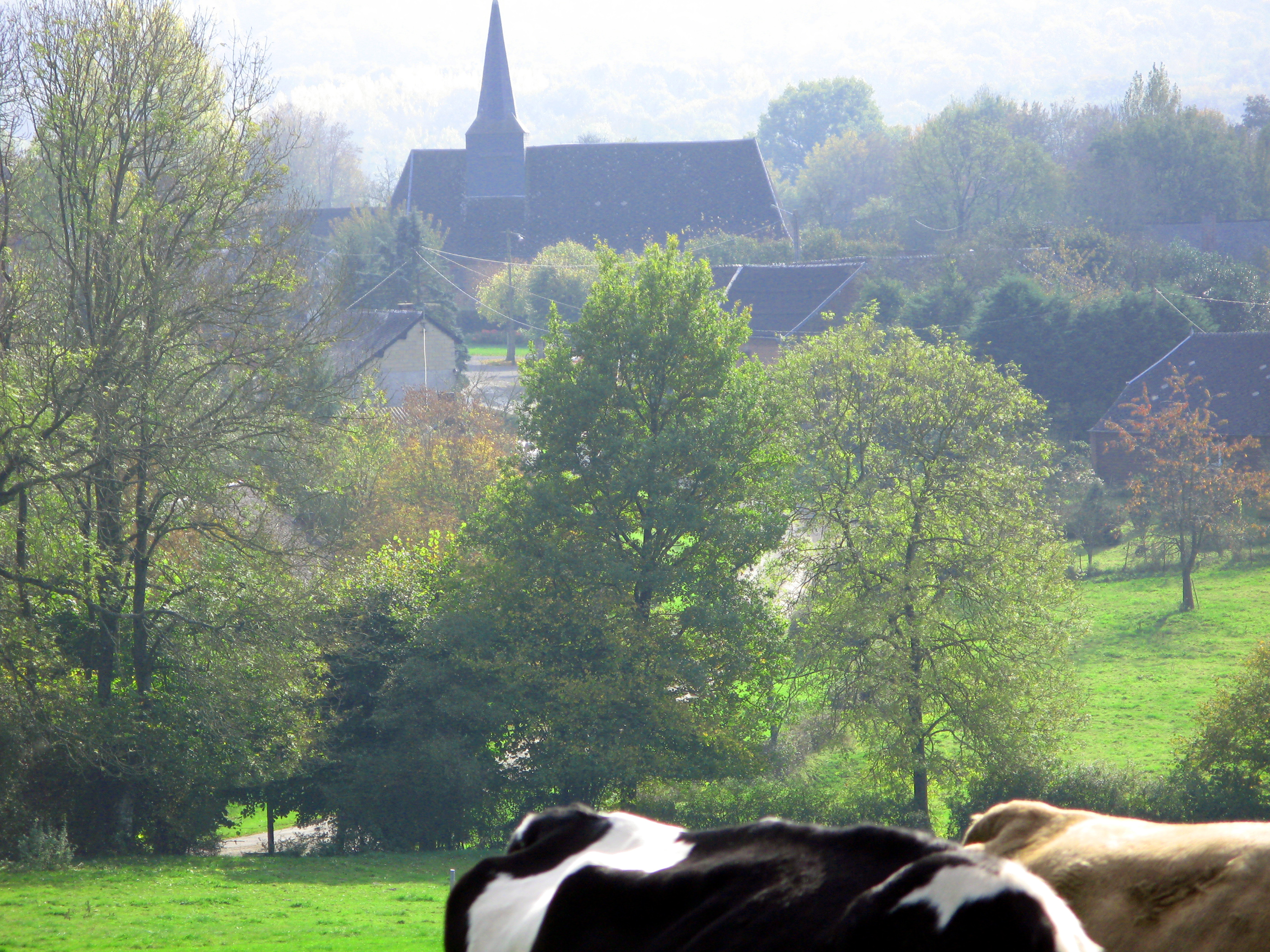
Ardennes Thiérache landscape at Blanchefosse-et-Bay.

The park encompasses the northwestern portion of the Ardennes department, encompassing a diverse array of topographical features. It is situated adjacent to the Belgian border to the north and east.

=== Landscapes and relief ===
==== The Givet point ====
The landscape of the Givet point is distinguished by a topography comprising hills, and forests, which at times give way to cultivated lands, rocky outcrops, and dry grasslands. The open space is also utilized for pastures. Shrubland extends across numerous hillsides, obscuring property boundaries. The Meuse River does not adhere to a narrow valley here, instead providing a wide horizon.

The construction of buildings in the area frequently employs the use of brick or the local Givet blue stone, which is quarried in the vicinity. This choice of materials lends a subtle touch of color to the buildings and reflects the waters of the Meuse in the building facades.

The town of Givet is situated along both banks of the river, with a smaller settlement on one side, which was still referred to as "Les Galoches" during the nineteenth century, and a larger Givet on the other side.

==== The Ardennes Massif ====
The Ardennes Massif constitutes a component of the primary Ardennes, the section associated with the French Ardennes department, which derives its designation from this region. This area is densely forested and rugged, exhibiting deep, winding valleys, particularly along the Meuse and its tributaries, including the Semois.

The Ardennes Massif and the viewpoints overlooking the Meuse Valley contribute considerably to the area's overall appeal. Throughout history, these sites have served as a source of inspiration for the human imagination, giving rise to numerous legends. Some sites are particularly well-known, including the Longue Roche panorama (in the Château-Régnault state forest), the Dames de la Meuse site (at Laifour), the Four Sons of Aymon rock (at Bogny-sur-Meuse), Roc la Tour (at Monthermé), Mont Malgré-Tout (at Revin, with the viewpoints of Faligeotte and Roche des Minches), and others. The region is sparsely populated and road infrastructure is limited. The altitude ranges from 140 meters in the valleys to 300–400 meters on the summits. The depth of the valley enhances the sense of relief, (Note: For Paul Vidal de la Blache: "It is not in prominence but in hollows that the modeling is accentuated." (Cf. de la Blache 2000).) yet the mountains are characterized by a gentle, undulating form, shrouded in foliage.

The meanders of the Meuse form genuine loops, with the town of Monthermé situated within one such loop, as are Joigny, Haybes, Fumay, Laifour, and Anchamps. In other instances, the settlements are situated between the river and the mountains, as observed in Levrézy and Deville.

Wet areas persist within the forest or form fens, which are heathlands on plateaus. One such example is the plateau of Hauts-Buttés, which boasts a great floral diversity. To the east of this plateau is the highest point of the massif, Croix-Scaille, which reaches an elevation of 504 meters above sea level and is situated on the border between France and Belgium. A small steep valley, characteristic of the region, is known as the Ravin de l'Ours and descends from the Hauts-Buttés, a hamlet in Monthermé, towards Linchamps, a hamlet in Les Hautes-Rivières.

In the vicinity of the villages, a considerable proportion of the forested area is occupied by clearings, or "sarts", which are the result of a local method of exploitation. This method, which involves clearing land through slash-and-burn agriculture, has been observed in other villages as well, including Hargnies. These clearings are typically found in the less hilly regions of the plateau and are utilized for cultivating vegetables, orchards, and pastures.

This frontier area has, at times, been regarded as a challenging terrain for military strategists to navigate. However, its valleys have served as locations for establishing a metallurgical industry, with facilities situated between the waterways and the slopes of the massif.

The number of villages is relatively limited. The houses, typically situated near one another, are constructed with three distinct sections: one for forage storage, another for livestock, and a third for living quarters. The roofs are characterized by a gentle slope and are covered in slate, while the walls are made of schist, imparting a distinctive visual profile.

==== The Rocroi Plateau ====
The Rocroi Plateau reaches elevations between 360 and 380 meters and is distinguished by its highly saturated soil, which is home to a multitude of "rièzes" (peat-rich heaths). These have developed as a consequence of deforestation and the subsequent growth of coppice woods. The pastures are arranged in a systematic grid pattern across approximately one hectare of land. The land pattern is punctuated by a few continuous marsh zones, situated between agricultural plots and the forest that encloses the open spaces. These include the Signy-le-Petit Forest, Bois des Hingues, Forêt des Pothées, and Bois d'Harcy. In his writings, Jules Michelet described the region as a "cold, uniform, and wild country, which travelers find ugly and whose monotonous sadness lends it a touching charm for those who were born there."

The isolated farms are frequently situated along the parcels. They are locally designated as "Censes." These are modest farms comprising two or three compact structures, constructed from quartzite or brick and covered with slate, or half-timbered houses with cob walls.

==== The slate rock formations ====
The slate basins are predominantly situated on the periphery of the Ardennes Massif and encompass some of the most ancient geological formations within this massif. These formations can be classified into the following categories:

- The basin of Fumay, Haybes, and Oignies, with its wine-red slates (called "red"), purple (called "blue"), and green slates;
- The basin of Rimogne, with its coarse, bluish-gray slates and blue slates;
- The basin of Monthermé and Deville, with its blue, gray, and green slates.

The Roche à Sept Heures site in Monthermé, which offers a vantage point over the Meuse valley, also serves as the entrance to an underground slate quarry. The name is derived from the sun's reflections, observed at seven o'clock, on this rocky spur composed of compact siliceous rocks rich in quartz, which reflect the light.

==== The Sormonne valley ====
The Sormonne is one of the Meuse's tributaries, originating from the Rocroi Plateau and fed by numerous streams. The Sormonne Valley was formed by the erosion of the Lias layer on the edge of the Ardennes Massif, creating a corridor of meadows and cultivated plots, interspersed with hedgerows and orchards. The settlements are situated near the watercourses. The settlements are frequently arranged around a principal thoroughfare, although introducing newer subdivisions or activity zones may result in a deviation from the conventional urban configuration. The attached farms feature wide "usoirs", or passageways, between the street and the façades of the houses. The facades of these buildings are constructed from yellow limestone.

==== The Ardennes Thiérache ====
This is the easternmost part of the Thiérache region, situated within the Aisne department but extending into the Ardennes and the Nord. This land is characterized by a network of hedgerows and forests, with a gently undulating topography. The underlying subsoil corresponds to the end of the Lias and infra-Cretaceous layers.

Forests occupy approximately 20% of the area, typically situated on the hillsides, imparting a darker hue to the landscape. The grasslands and valley floors are predominantly covered in grass. The upper parts of this area, when gently sloped, are now frequently utilized for cultivating cereals and oilseeds. This use of the land as arable land contrasts with the traditional forests and grasslands.

The villages are situated in the lower reaches of the hillsides. The buildings are characterised by a high degree of regularity, with structures aligned in a linear fashion, facades crafted from white limestone, and gabled roofs clad in slate. The houses are arranged in long, uniform rows.

=== Natural reserves and notable natural areas ===
==== Natural reserves ====
Three natural reserves are included in the territory of the park:

- The grasslands of the Pointe de Givet: These dry grasslands were once grazing areas for herds on rocky, steep terrain, particularly interesting from a geological standpoint, characteristic of the Givetian era.
- The Vireux-Molhain Natural Reserve: It is one of the oldest fossil sites in France.

Both of these reserves hold the status of National Natural Reserves (RNN) due to their interest and importance.

- The Côte de Bois-en-Val Regional Nature Reserve: This site was exploited as a quarry for lime and building stone production until the 1950s. Since operations ceased, the site has gradually returned to a wild state.

This reserve holds the status of a Regional Natural Reserve (RNR).

==== Natura 2000 sites and ZNIEFF ====
A significant proportion of the department's natural zones of ecological, faunistic and floristic interest (ZNIEFF), as well as seven of its fourteen Natura 2000 sites of community interest, are located within the territory of the regional park:

- The Ardennes plateau;
- The slate quarries of Monthermé and Deville;
- The forests of the Semois valley in Thilay and Hauts-Buttés;
- The grasslands, rocks, and boxwood groves of the Pointe de Givet;
- The bogs of the Rocroi plateau;
- The peat bogs of the Ardennes plateau;
- The wooded valley of the Houille.

Natural areas of ecological, faunal, and floristic interest included in the Regional Natural Park of the Ardennes:
Natural areas of ecological, faunistic and floristic interest (INPN N° and label):
- 210020014 Former slate quarries of Monthermé and Deville
- 210009845 Forest of the Alyse stream valley in Fumay
- 210020077 Forest of l'Écaillière and monks' pasture in Éteignières
- 210002019 Nichet Forest in Fromelennes
- 210020082 Aurains Forest east of Fumay
- 210020040 Forest of the Falières and Saussaie streams northwest of Revin
- 210001131 Trou Caillou Forest and boulettes forest in Revin and Monthermé
- 210020100 Forest and rocky escarpment of Mont Malgré Tout in Revin
- 210020079 Forest and marsh of the Chaudière and Sainte-Anne streams in Taillette
- 210001116 Forest and marsh of the Grand Ravet in Braux and Aulnay
- 210020167 Acidophilous forests and meadows of Woiries northeast of Monthermé
- 210009836 Forest and marshes of the Manceau Mill stream, Cabre marsh, and Gendarme pond in Rocroi
- 210002012 Set of limestone grasslands and associated habitats of the Pointe de Givet
- 210020180 Château de Montcornet and its surroundings
- 210002014 Escarpments, Fort Charlemont, and Fort Condé in Givet
- 210009343 Ponds of La Fermière and Le Gland in Beaulieu and Signy-le-Petit
- 210020081 Communal forest of Fumay (left bank of the Meuse)
- 210009839 Forest of the right bank of the Viroin in Vireux-Molhain
- 210009852 Estremont forest and Serre valley in Blanchefosse-et-Bay and Le Fréty
- 210009838 Forest of the left slope of the Houille valley south of Charnois
- 210009841 Forests and escarpments of the Semoy valley and its tributaries in Thilay and Hautes-Rivières
- 210020156 La Longue Roche, Cerceaux hill, and the Terne plateau in Monthermé
- 210002037 Vieilles Forges lake-retention north of Renwez
- 210000742 Frouchis heathland in Taillette
- 210000743 Hubert forest heathland in Rocroi and Taillette
- 210020043 Heathland and forest of the Marquisades basin southwest of Revin
- 210002015 Mont d'Haurs and the left slope of the Houille valley
- 210001126 The Ardennes plateau
- 210002013 Tienne de Chooz-Foisches
- 210001132 Ours valley in Thilay and Hautes-Rivières
- 210002017 Petit-Chooz rocks
- 210002038 Sécheval marsh
- 210001129 Rosemary marsh in Hautes-Rivières
- 210001130 Marshes, meadows, and forests of Hauts-Buttés and its surroundings in Hargnies and Monthermé
- 210000741 Peat bogs and Gué d'Hossus forest
- 210009878 Grands Trieux grasslands in Aubrives
- 210009877 Ternes des Marteaux grasslands and Mont des Religieuses in Fromelennes
- 210020155 Six Chenons oligotrophic grasslands and meadows in Thilay
- 210020062 Acidophilous meadows, forests, and aquatic environments around Hargnies
- 210020123 Meadows and forests of the Sormonne valley between Laval-Morency and Sormonne
- 210020220 Fauconnier hollow meadows and moors in Regniowez
- 210020039 Oligotrophic meadows and small woods of the Sormonne northeast of Éteignières
- 210000744 Rièze of the Gland stream source in Regniowez
- 210001122 Rièze of the Moulin à Vent (source of the Rouge Fontaine stream) in Sévigny-la-Forêt
- 210000740 Rièzes of Rocroi-Regniowez and surrounding areas, and Apance valley forests (upstream and downstream of Bourbonne-les-Bains)
- 210002016 Aviette rocks and Maurière escarpments in Rancennes
- 210013033 Laifour rocks and Dames de Meuse alluvial terrace south of Anchamps
- 210002018 Rocks at Wagne and rocky escarpments in Chooz
- 210008898 Tiennes and Le Duc forest north of Foisches
- 210001128 Vieux Moulins de Thilay peat bogs and Marotel stream
- 210009840 Houille valley south of Landrichamps
- 210020042 Vrigne valley and forested valleys of the Grandes Hazelles forest to Nefmanil forest, from Rumel to Gespunsart
- 210020080 Mairupt and Lambreque valleys between Laifour and Deville
- 210020076 Saultry stream, La Ferrière stream, and Marsh of the Wolves valleys in Maubert-Fontaine and Sévigny-la-Forêt

=== Climat ===
There is not one but several climates, reflecting the diversity observed in the soils and landscapes:

- The average annual temperatures vary from 8 °C in the Hauts-Buttés area, one of the park's highest points, to 10 °C in Charleville or the Pointe de Givet.
- Rainfall ranges from 800 mm in Charleville or Givet, 1,000 mm in the Sormonne valley and Thiérache, 1,200 mm in Rocroi, and more than 1,250 mm, with marked snowy episodes in the Hauts-Buttés area.

Meteorological report at Rocroi (393 m altitude):
Month	Jan	Feb	Mar	Apr	May	Jun	Jul	Aug	Sep	Oct	Nov	Dec
Minimum average temperature (°C)	-2	-2	0	3	6	9	11	11	9	5	2	-1
Maximum average temperature (°C)	3	4	8	12	16	19	21	21	18	13	7	4
Source: Météo-France 1951-1980

Meteorological report at Ham-sur-Meuse (110 m altitude in the Pointe de Givet)
Month	Jan	Feb	Mar	Apr	May	Jun	Jul	Aug	Sep	Oct	Nov	Dec
Minimum average temperature (°C)	-1	0	1	3	7	10	12	11	9	6	3	0
Maximum average temperature (°C)	6	7	12	15	20	23	25	24	22	17	10	6
Source: Météo-France 1951-1980

The climate exhibits a transition from a degraded oceanic climate in the Signy-le-Petit area to a temperate climate in the Pointe de Givet, to a continental climate in Rocroi, and finally to a sub-mountain climate in the Hauts-Buttés region. With increasing altitude, the continental nature of the climate becomes more pronounced.

The topography also gives rise to the formation of microclimates. The lower precipitation levels observed in the Pointe de Givet can be attributed to its position to the northeast of the Rocroi massif, which acts as a barrier, preventing some of the moisture from westerly winds from reaching this area. A further phenomenon occurs between Rocroi and Revin, where the deep valley known as the "Misery Valley" accumulates fog. This does not, however, prevent the Misery Valley from being considered by some hikers as a "paradise on earth", a place apart from the world where foxes and squirrels visit unannounced.

=== Hydrography ===
The Meuse River and seven of its tributaries traverse the Ardennes Regional Natural Park. These tributaries are the Sormonne, Semois, Goutelle, Houille, Faux, Viroin, and Vrigne. The Meuse enters the park's territory at an elevation of 140 meters above sea level and exits to the north at an elevation of 99 meters. Its flow rate is irregular, with an average discharge of 144 m^{3} per second at Chooz, exclusive of the Houille flow.

The highest water levels are observed during the winter months, with average monthly discharges ranging from 225 to 277 cubic meters per second (m^{3}/s) between December and March, with a peak in February. From March onwards, the flow rate declines until the low summer waters, from June to October, with an average monthly discharge as low as 50.5 m^{3}/s in September. These monthly averages, calculated using measurements taken over 56 years (1953-2008), obscure significant occasional fluctuations. (Note: Refer to the Wikipedia article on the Meuse, from which this graph of average flow rates is taken.)

Average monthly flow (m^{3}/s) measured at the Chooz hydrological station
Month	Flow
January	273
February	277
March	225
April	174
May	113
June	77.7
July	62.7
August	51.4
September	50.5
October	77.1
November	130
December	229

The volume of water flowing through the French section of the Meuse is 452 mm annually, which is significantly higher than the French national average of 320 mm across all basins. One of the Meuse's tributaries, the Faux, has an even higher flow rate, at 579 mm. To harness this water for hydroelectric production, facilities have been installed on this tributary.

The Meuse River flows in a northward direction, displaying a sinuous course that is characterized by a series of meanders. The Trans-Ardennes Greenway, a dedicated cycling route, follows the former towpaths along the Meuse River from Montcy-Notre-Dame, situated near Charleville-Mézières, to the town of Givet. The Houille valley, located to the south of Landrichamps, has been designated a natural area of ecological, faunal, and floristic interest. Similarly, the Vrigne valley in Gespunsart and the Lac des Vieilles Forges in the Faux valley, which has already been referenced and is situated within a forest, have also been designated as natural areas of ecological, faunal, and floristic interest. One of the Oise's tributaries, the Gland, has its source in a park area situated at an altitude of 315 meters within the Signy-le-Petit forest.

=== Economy ===
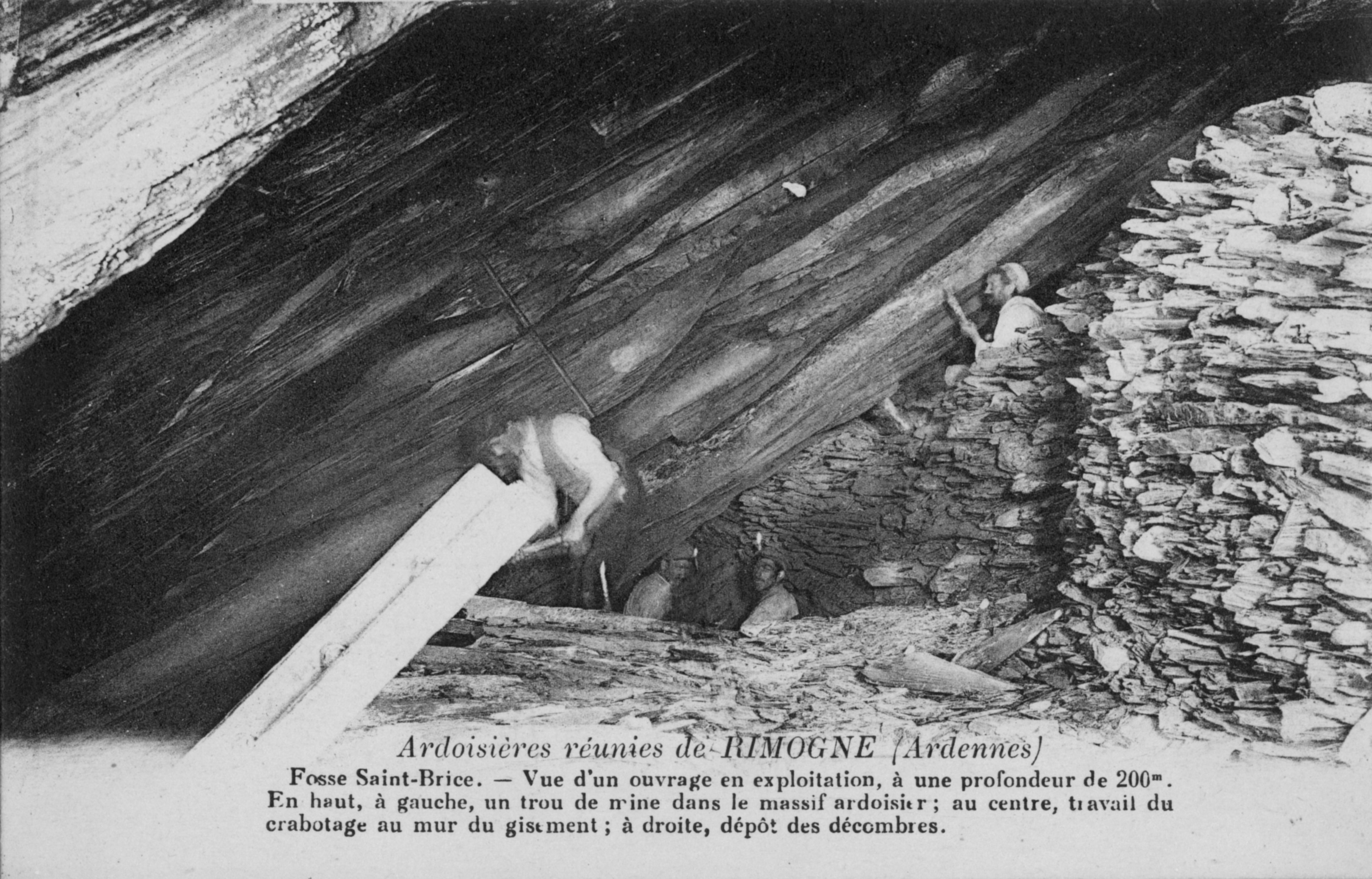
Slate quarrying.

The Pointe de Givet and the Ardennes Massif have a longstanding tradition of artisanal and manufacturing activities, which have been complemented by a robust industrial sector, particularly in the areas of metallurgy, foundry work, and, historically, weapons manufacturing. The arms industry declined in the nineteenth century with the closure of the Charleville arms factory. In this context, several major industrial names were either created or developed in the region, including Electrolux (Arthur Martin, Faure, etc.), Deville, Porcher, Thomé-Génot, Mineur Frères, and Wilmot, which subsequently became Usinor.

The region continues to be a significant center for industrial activity, contributing 36% of the department's employment in this sector. This industrial activity is frequently highlighted by political authorities, for example, during visits to the Ardennes by the Minister of the Interior and presidential candidate Nicolas Sarkozy in 2006 and again by the same Nicolas Sarkozy, who is now the President of France, in 2011. However, this industrial activity is confronted with considerable international competition and the practice of outsourcing activities to other countries. The expertise in metalworking has facilitated the establishment of innovative companies, including Les Ateliers de Janves, Nexans, NPL, Faynot, and others, which have succeeded historical businesses. Manufacturing activities producing nuts and bolts are still ongoing in Bogny-sur-Meuse through small and medium-sized enterprises (SMEs), often specializing in specific products (Affel'm, Marbaise, Cousin-Malicet, etc.). A similar situation can be observed in Thilay and Hautes-Rivières. Some companies also identify opportunities in the arts and crafts sectors, such as ironwork, brassware, or damascening.

Nevertheless, the closure of a considerable number of factories in recent decades has given rise to social concerns. This has also resulted in the creation of industrial wastelands that require the rehabilitation or demolition of buildings and the decontamination of certain areas. In response, memory sites have been established, such as the Ardennes Metallurgy Museum in Bogny-sur-Meuse.

Despite the sustained quality of the products from this Ardennes region, the cessation of slate quarrying, which commenced in the Middle Ages, occurred in the 1970s.

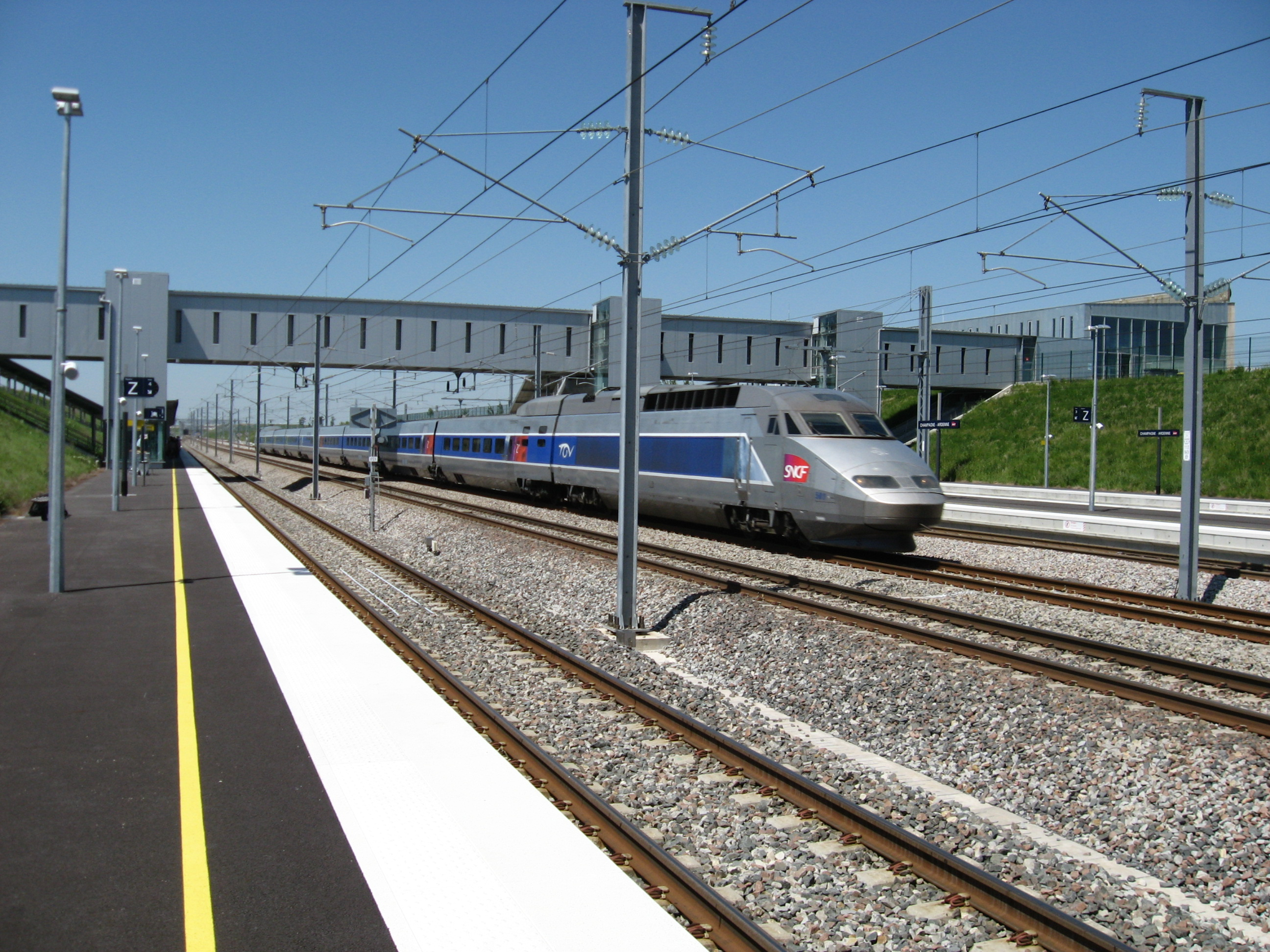
TGV in the Ardennes.

The regional economy is transforming, with the emergence of new industrial activities that align with the region's manufacturing tradition and the growth of service and leisure sectors. The introduction of high-speed rail connectivity with the gateway city of Charleville-Mézières and the gradual expansion of the motorway network is contributing to the region's integration into the broader economic landscape, reducing its isolation.

Another area of focus is the future of river transport and the Port of Givet. In 1964, the Port of Givet was the leading inland port in France, with an activity of 1,796,500 tons, the majority of which consisted of coal, wood, metals, coke, and fertilizers. In the subsequent decades, this activity declined to a negligible level, reaching a nadir in 1994. However, traffic has partially returned at the beginning of the 21st century. The port is used as a logistics hub for the major ports of the North Sea (Antwerp, Rotterdam, Amsterdam, etc.) due to its capacity to accommodate large barges (1,500 tons). Activities have diversified (still wood, cast iron, but also de-icing salt, winter storage for pleasure boats, etc.), with traffic reaching approximately 600,000 tons.

The Rocroi plateau and the Sormonne Valley are undergoing a process of industrial development, with the creation of new industrial zones and, more recently, the establishment of wind energy production areas.

Forestry continues to represent a more traditional activity that is closely associated with the region's image, yet it remains a significant contributor to the local economy. The Renwez Forest Museum provides insight into the nature of this activity a century ago, illustrating its substantial impact on the regional economy and society. At the time, a significant number of jobs were generated, with a notable population of lumberjacks and other individuals residing in the forest itself. The introduction of mechanization has resulted in a significant reduction in the workforce required for these tasks. The forested area has also been shaped by ancestral practices, including the right to collect firewood (affouage), grazing, the practice of sartage, which promoted the growth of coppice, and oak debarking for tannin harvesting. Additionally, the region has experienced damage from military conflicts, including those between France and Germany. Nevertheless, the silviculture continues to demonstrate considerable dynamism. The sessile oak is the dominant broadleaf species in private stands and mixed coppice-with-standards. The pedunculate oak is the second most common broadleaf species. The third most common species is the downy and silver birches. Despite being well-suited to the region, the beech occupies a more modest place due to its historical management as coppice. The Norway spruce covers 33% of privately owned forested land and has been planted since the 1950s.

In addition, this rural region is distinguished by a significant presence of agricultural activities, particularly ruminant livestock farming, which is supported by extensive grassland areas and modest farm sizes. However, the process of land consolidation has resulted in an increase in the area of cultivated land at the expense of livestock and grazing land in the Thiérache Ardennaise. The dairy processing sector is relatively underdeveloped in the region, with the primary industrial site being the Rouvroy-sur-Audry dairy and a modest cheese-making tradition. It is noteworthy that one of the few local cheeses, Rocroi, originating from the town of the same name, is still produced in an artisanal manner but is no longer manufactured within the park's territory.

=== Population ===
A demographic analysis of the park area from 1999 to 2008, based on figures from the French National Institute of Statistics and Economic Studies (INSEE), indicates a 5% decline in the population residing within the designated area.

The park can be divided into two distinct zones. The initial zone encompasses the cantons of Nouzonville, Monthermé, Revin, Fumay, and Givet, situated along the Meuse Valley. It exhibits a population density of 133 inhabitants per km^{2}, a value that surpasses France's density (approximately 100) but reflects an 8% decline in population. The second zone comprises the western cantons of Renwez, Rumigny, Signy-le-Petit, and Rocroi. It exhibits a markedly lower population density (33 inhabitants per km^{2}) and a 6% population increase over the same period. This growth is particularly evident in the Renwez canton, where the expansion of the urban center of Charleville-Mézières has been notable. This urban expansion will be closely monitored in the coming years.

== Fauna and flora ==
=== Pointe de Givet ===
The northernmost region of the park is home to some noteworthy plant species, including white mugwort, St. Bernard's lily, and Carthusian pink. Among the protected animal species that can be found here are woodlarks. The rocky outcrops of the Meuse Valley are also host to the Eurasian eagle-owl and peregrine falcon. The area is home to 52 species of butterfly.

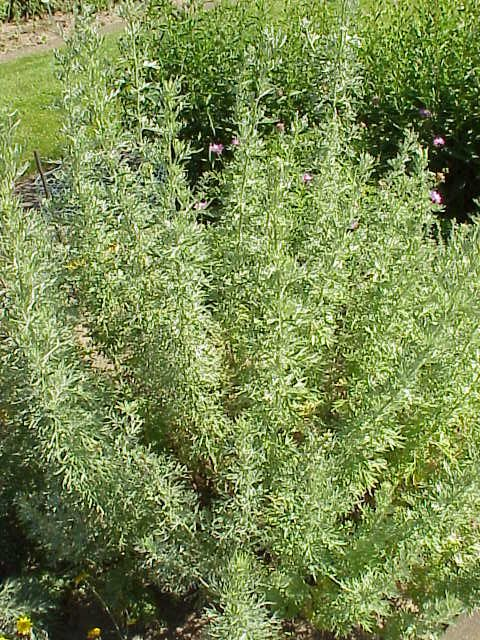
White mugwort.

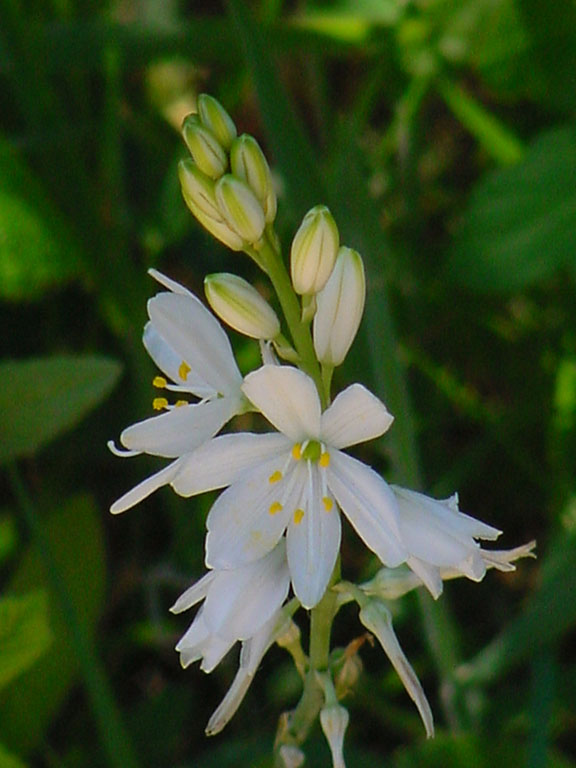
St. Bernard's lily.

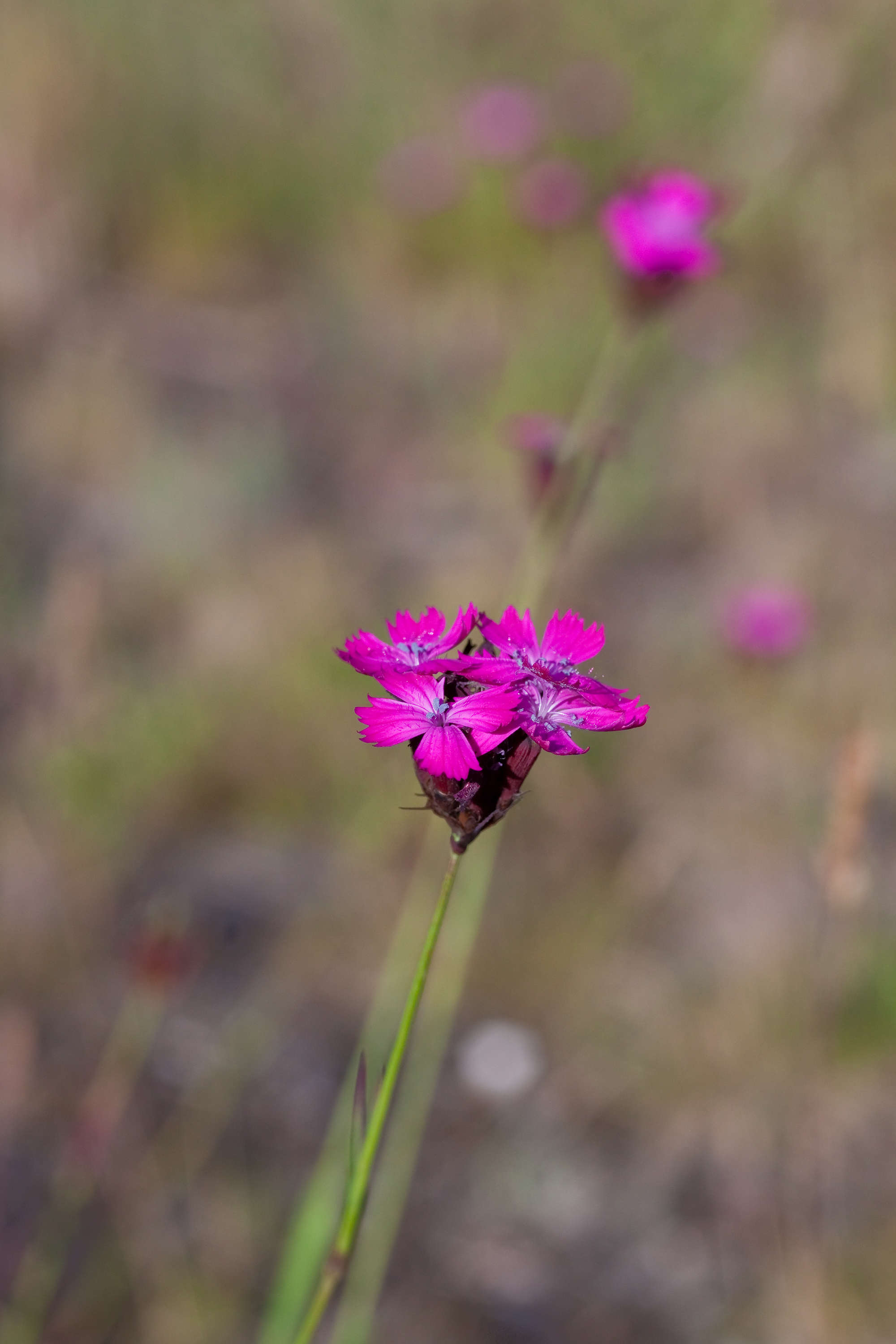
Carthusian pink.

=== Ardennes Massif ===
This primarily wooded area composes of oak, beech, hornbeam, and birch trees. It is one of the oldest forests in France, where deciduous trees remain the dominant species, although spruce and larch trees are also present. The undergrowth is rich in ferns and purple foxgloves. In wetter areas, such as the marshes of Hauts-Buttés, white cottongrass flourishes amidst a diverse and rare fauna and flora.

The spotted nutcracker, black woodpecker, kingfisher, and wildcat have been observed to utilize this massif as a refuge, as have black storks. The region is home to a variety of large mammals, including the red deer and wild boar, which has been identified as an emblem of the former domain of the Celtic goddess Arduinna. The European beaver has also made a comeback in the regional park's waterways. To preserve the peat bogs of Hauts-Buttés from forest encroachment, the introduction of hardy horses, such as Konik horses, rather than Ardennais horses, has been implemented.

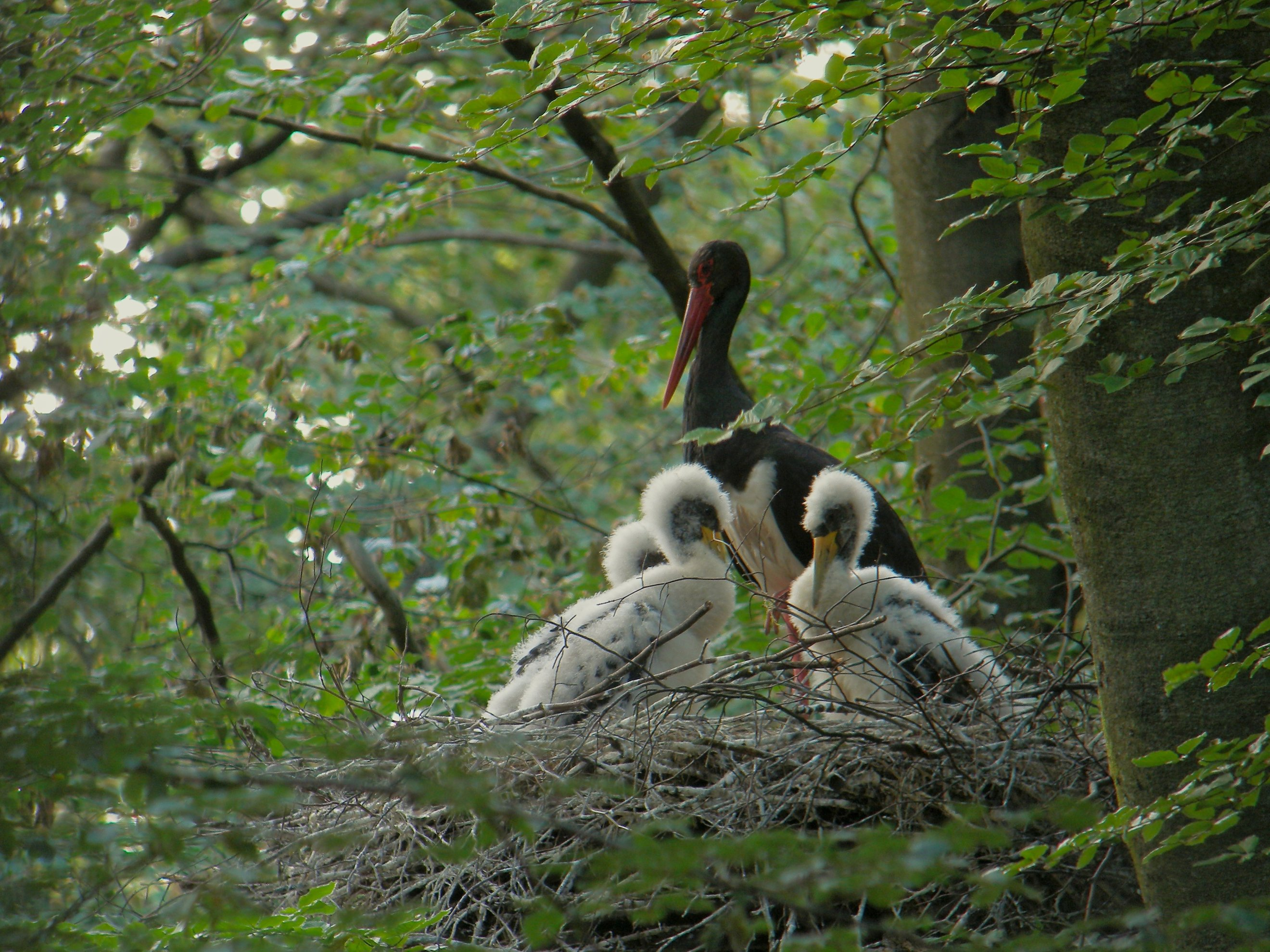
Black stork.

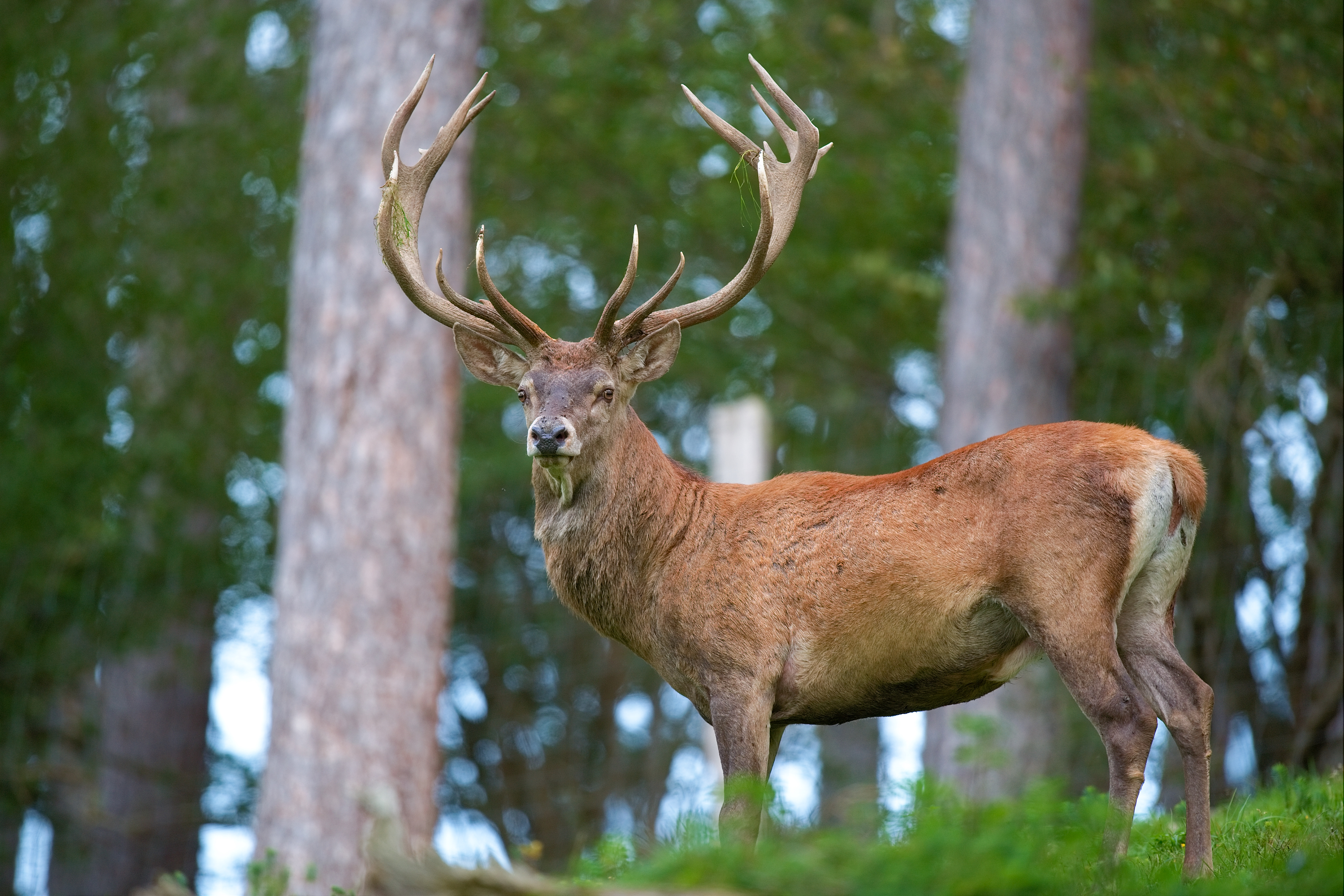
Red deer.

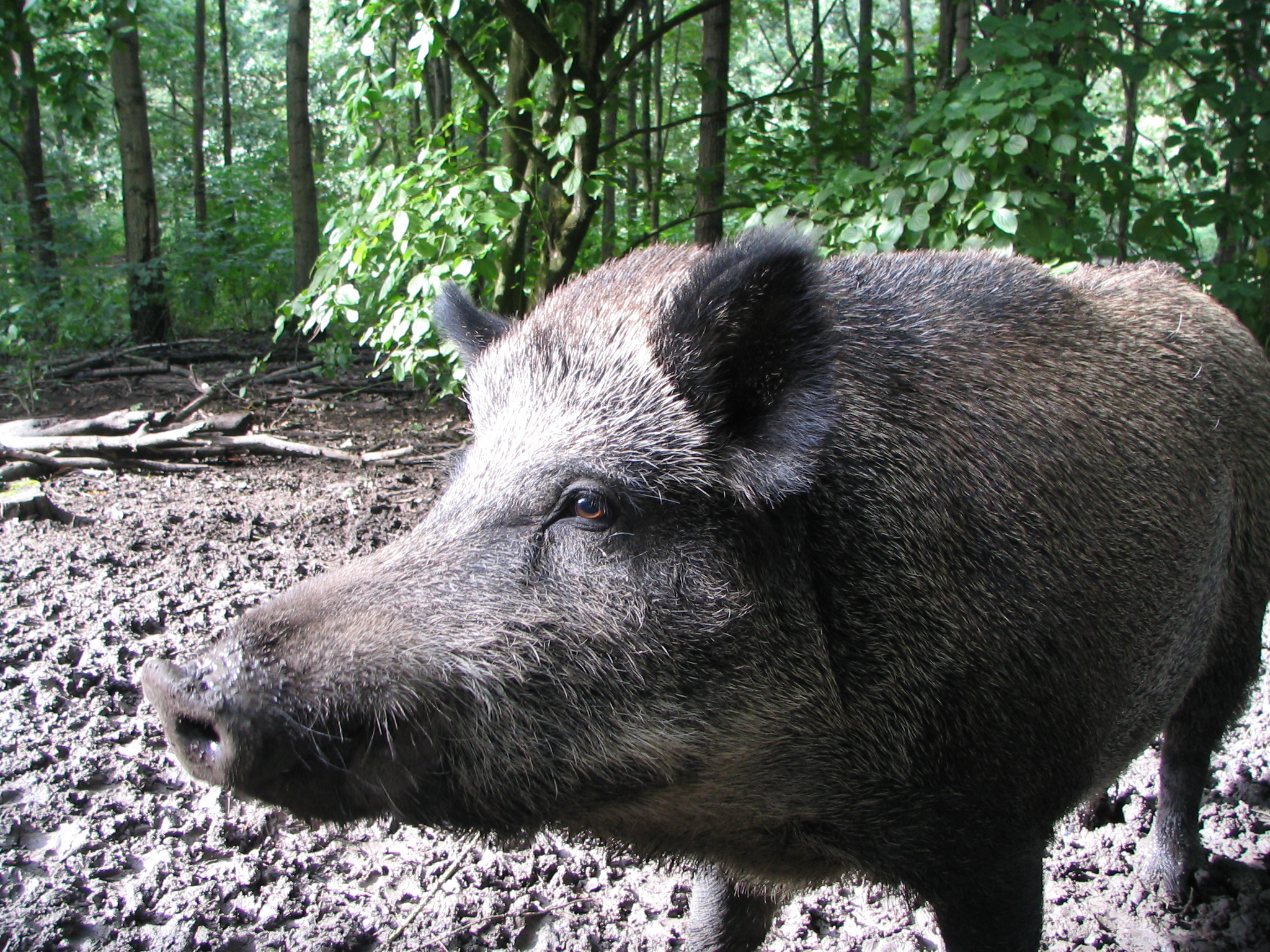
Wild boar.

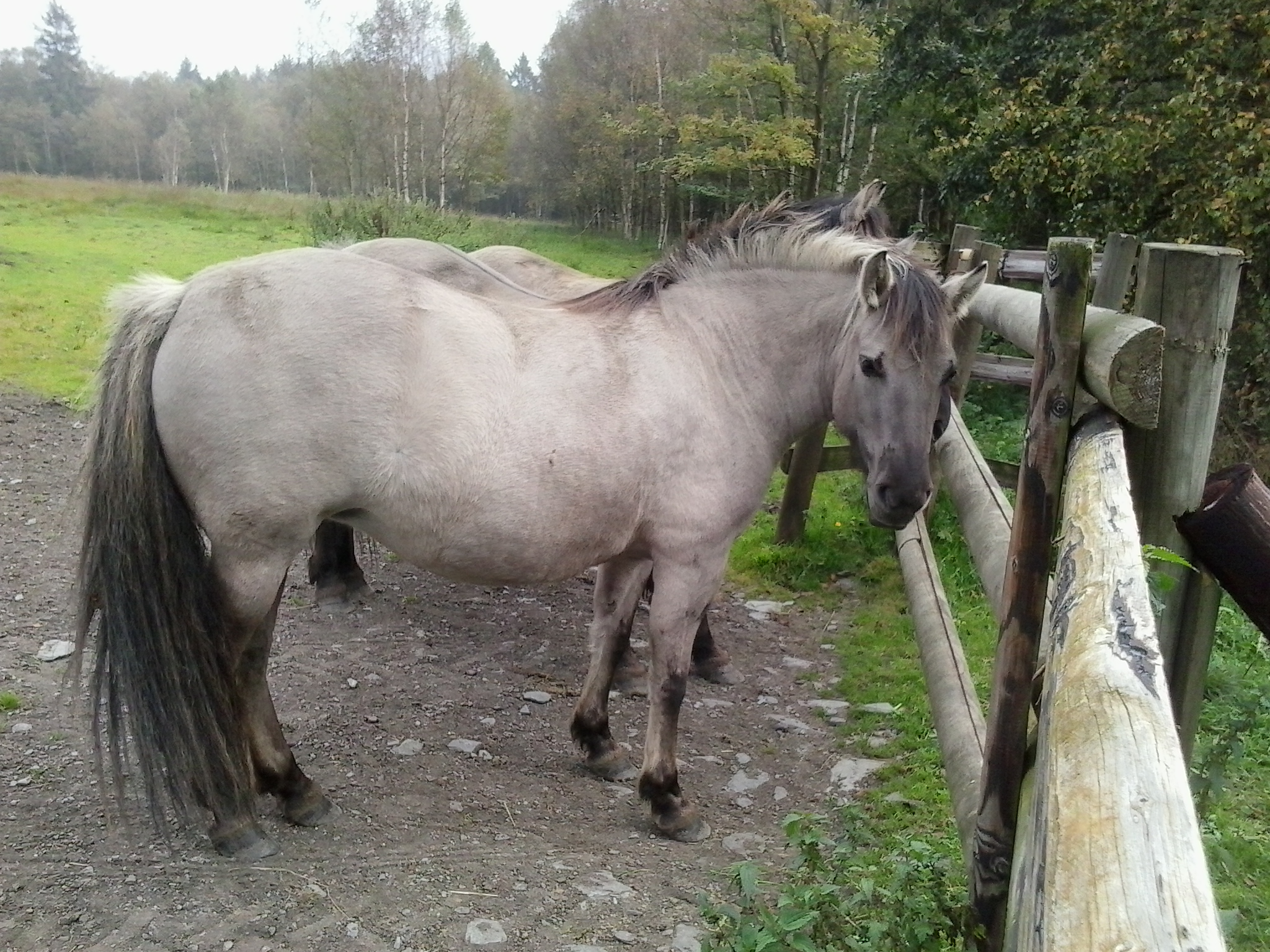
Konik-Polski equine.

=== The Rocroi Plateau ===
The vegetation is primarily composed of heather and broom. However, other notable flora include arnica, gentians, sphagnum mosses, European chickweed, and carnivorous sundews.

The Rocroi Plateau is home to a plethora of rare and protected species, including the hazel grouse (a highly endangered bird species), the shrike (a passerine bird), the little owl (a symbol of the goddess Athena in ancient Greece), Tengmalm's owl (also known as the boreal owl), the arctic emerald dragonfly, and the cranberry fritillary. The cranberry fritillary (Boloria aquilonaris) is a striking orange bog butterfly with diverse brown markings.

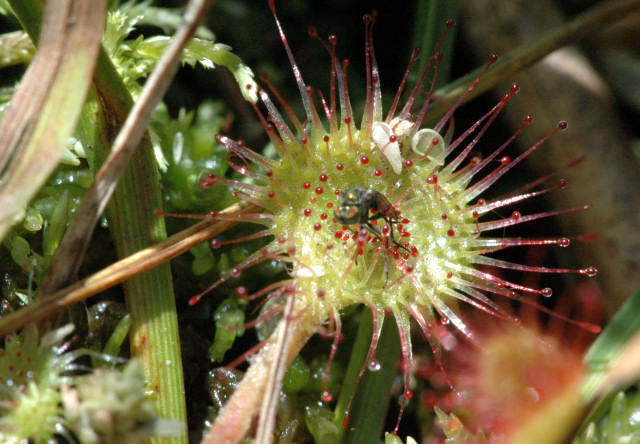
Sundews.

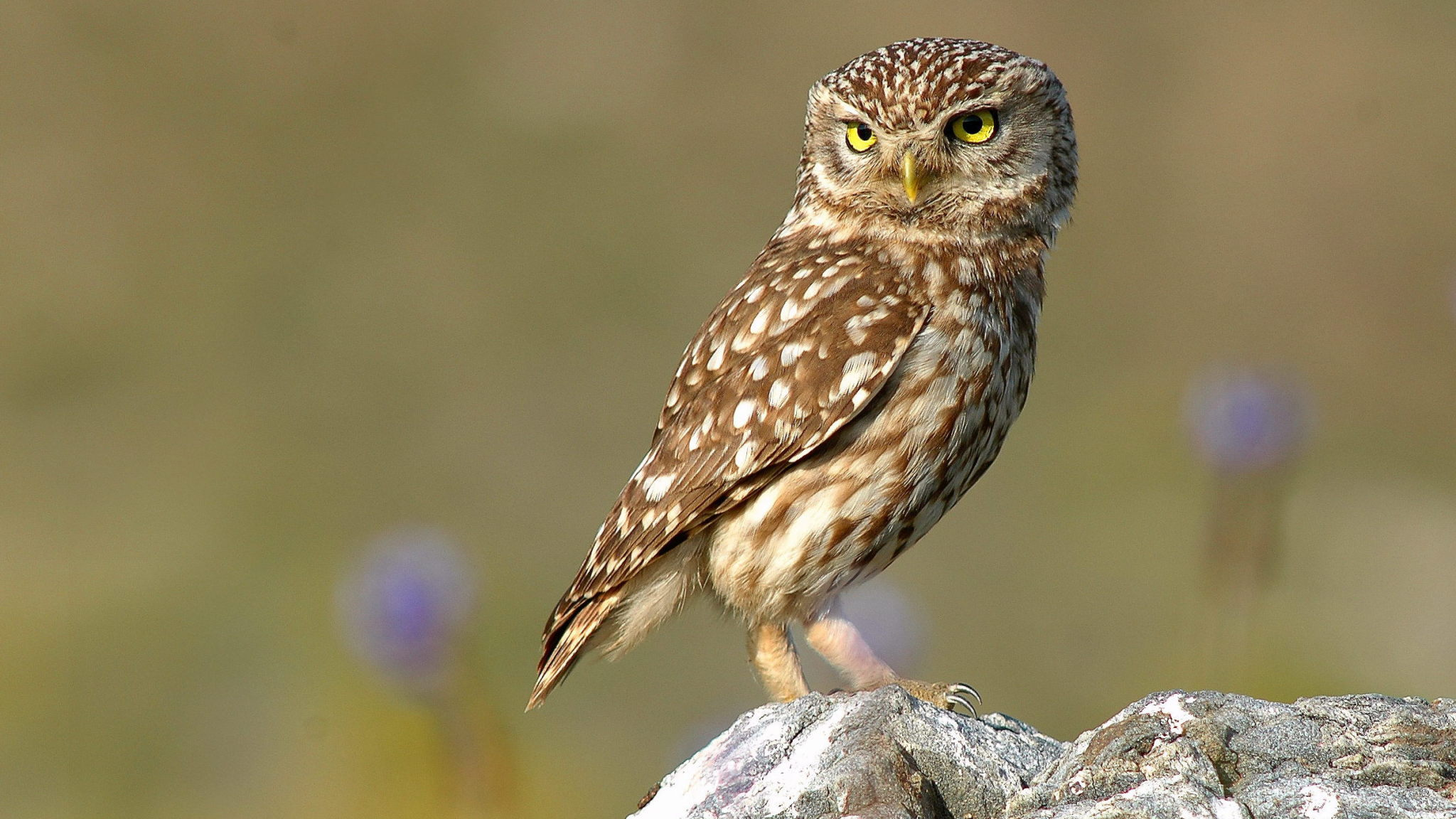
Little owl.

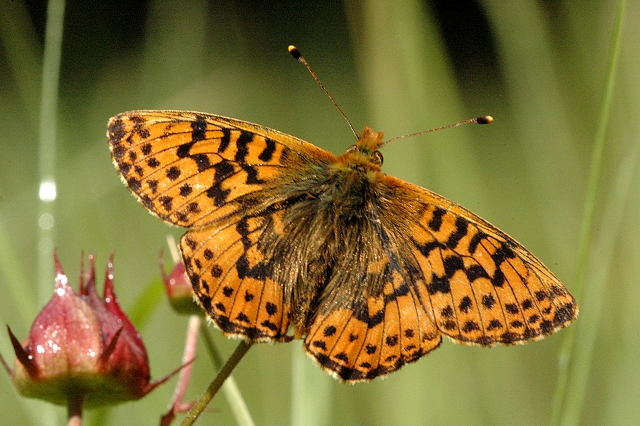
Cranberry fritillary.

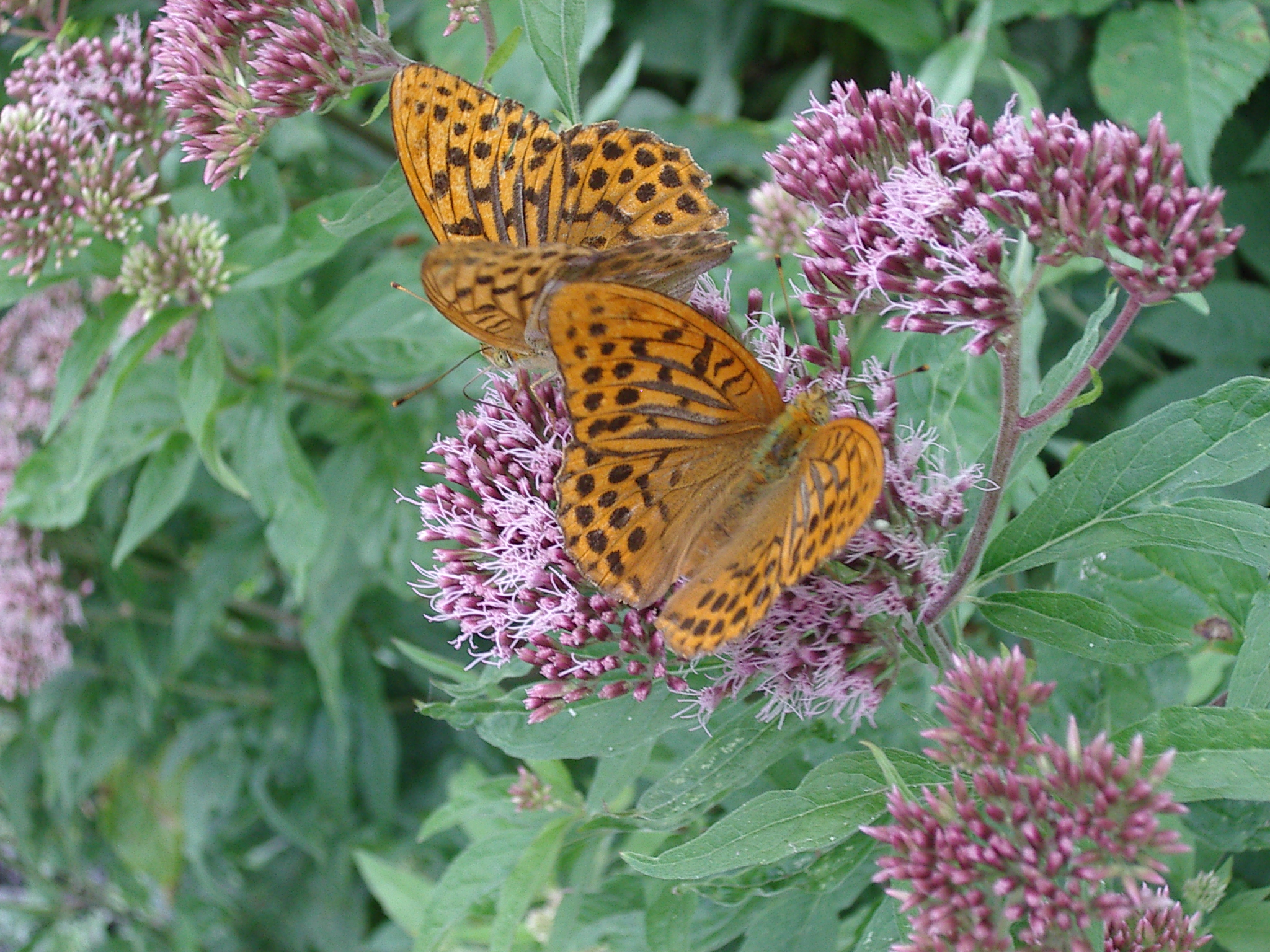
Silver-washed fritillary.

=== The slate quarries ===
The greater mouse-eared bat, Bechstein's bat, the greater horseshoe bat, the fringed bat, the barbastelle bat, and the lesser horseshoe bat are protected species that hibernate in the old underground quarries. These former galleries, which were once utilized by humans, can have disastrous effects on these peaceful inhabitants if they are disturbed.

=== The Sormonne valley ===
The flora of the acidic meadows in the Sormonne Valley is notable for its prevalence of stiff matgrass, purple moor grass, common lousewort, and creeping willow (a protected species), which coexist with daffodils, devil's-bit scabious, and other spotted orchids. Some of these meadows evolve into dry heathland, which is characterized by the presence of heather and English broom. Alternatively, they may evolve into wet heathland, which is characterized by the presence of heather. Other grazed meadows are adorned with woolly soft grass, sweet vernal grass, clover, creeping buttercup, and ribwort plantain.

The presence of dragonflies, lizards, and butterflies contributes to the vibrant biodiversity of these areas. One notable butterfly species, the marsh fritillary, is afforded protection under French legislation. Reptiles observed in the region include the common European adder, the viviparous lizard, and the slow worm. Among the mammalian fauna, the aquatic shrew is also a resident of the area.

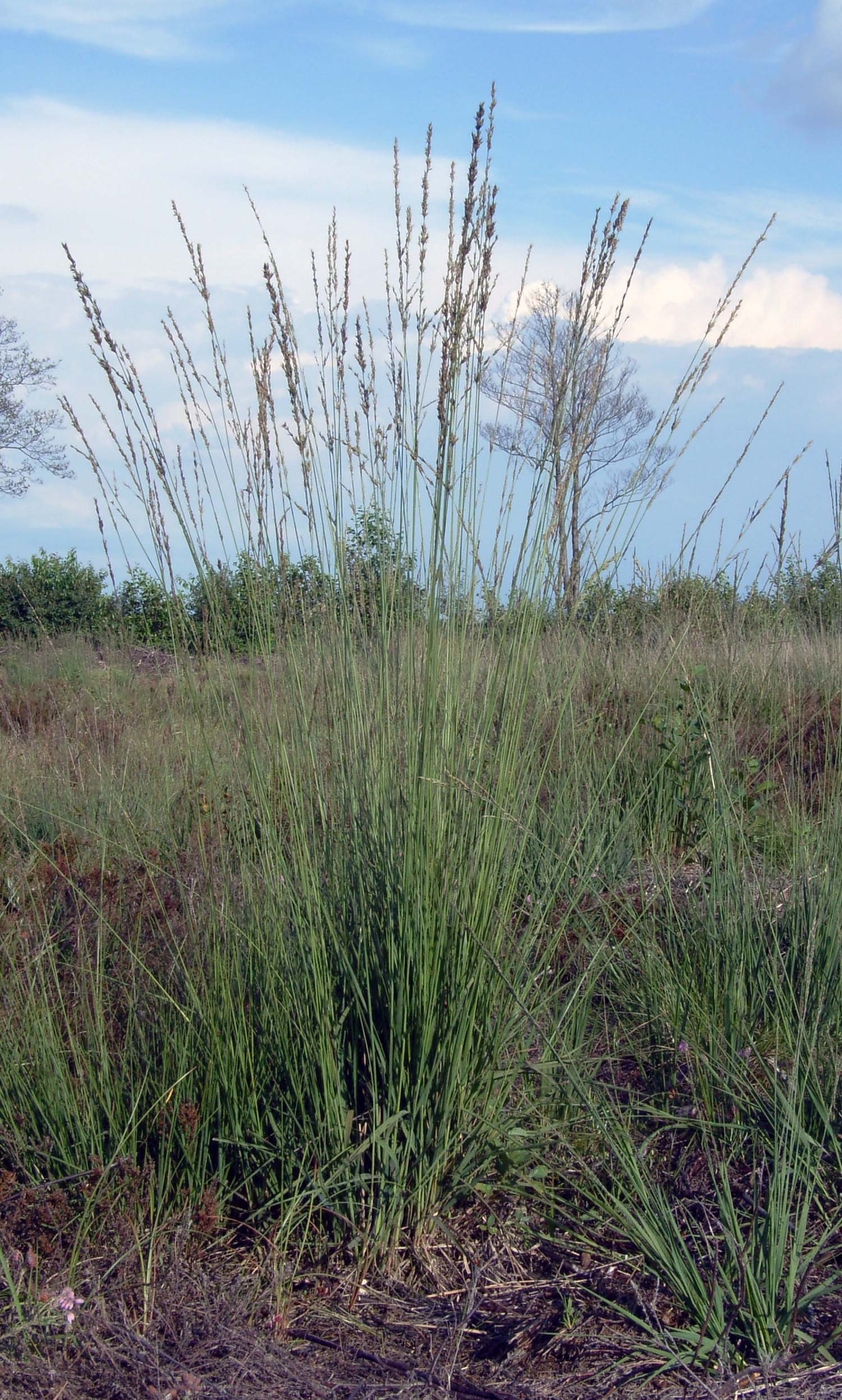
Purple moor-grass.

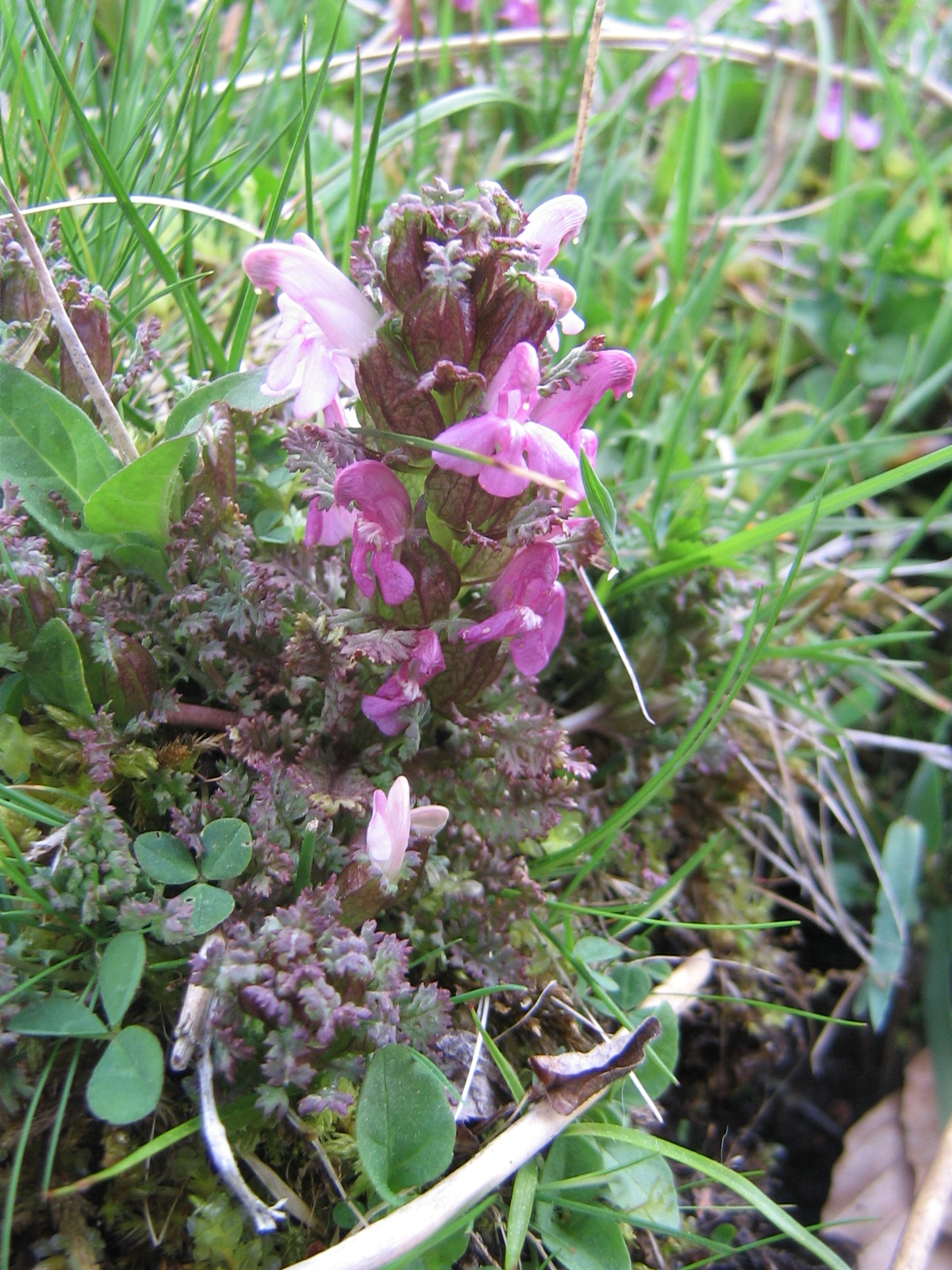
Common lousewort.

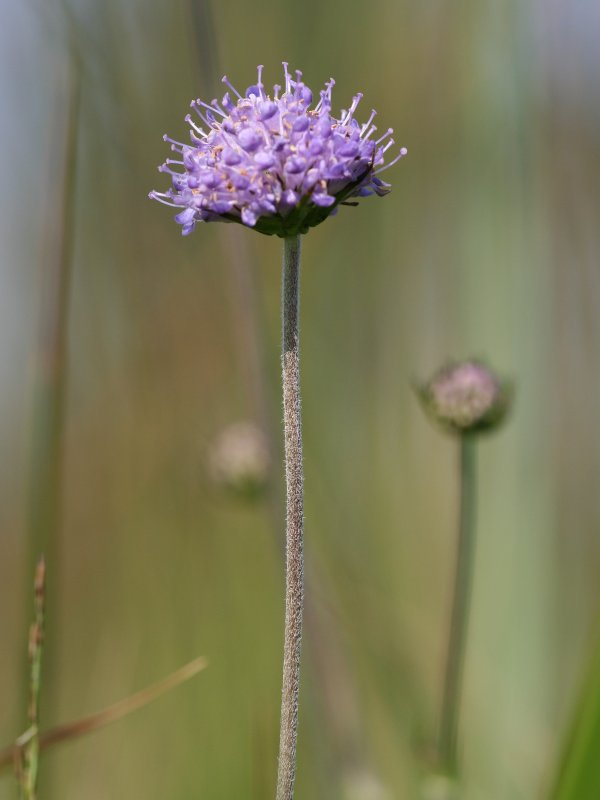
Devil's-bit.

=== The Thiérache Ardennaise ===
The landscape of Thiérache is distinguished by a mosaic of forest, pasture, embankment, and field habitats. Non-wooded areas are enhanced by the presence of hedgerows and orchards, which were previously threatened by land consolidation and are now somewhat better preserved. Additionally, riparian vegetation (comprising alders, willows, and other bushes) along waterways and streams contributes to the region's biodiversity. Hedgerows and riparian zones shelters animals, particularly insects and birds. Examples of birds that can be found in this area include the red-backed shrike with its black eye stripe, the stonechat, the whinchat, the grey shrike, the colorful European goldfinch, the barn swallow (a migratory bird), the common chaffinch, the blue tit, the great tit, the marsh tit, the tree pipit, the meadow pipit, the yellowhammer, and more. The black kite and the common kestrel select larger trees for nesting.

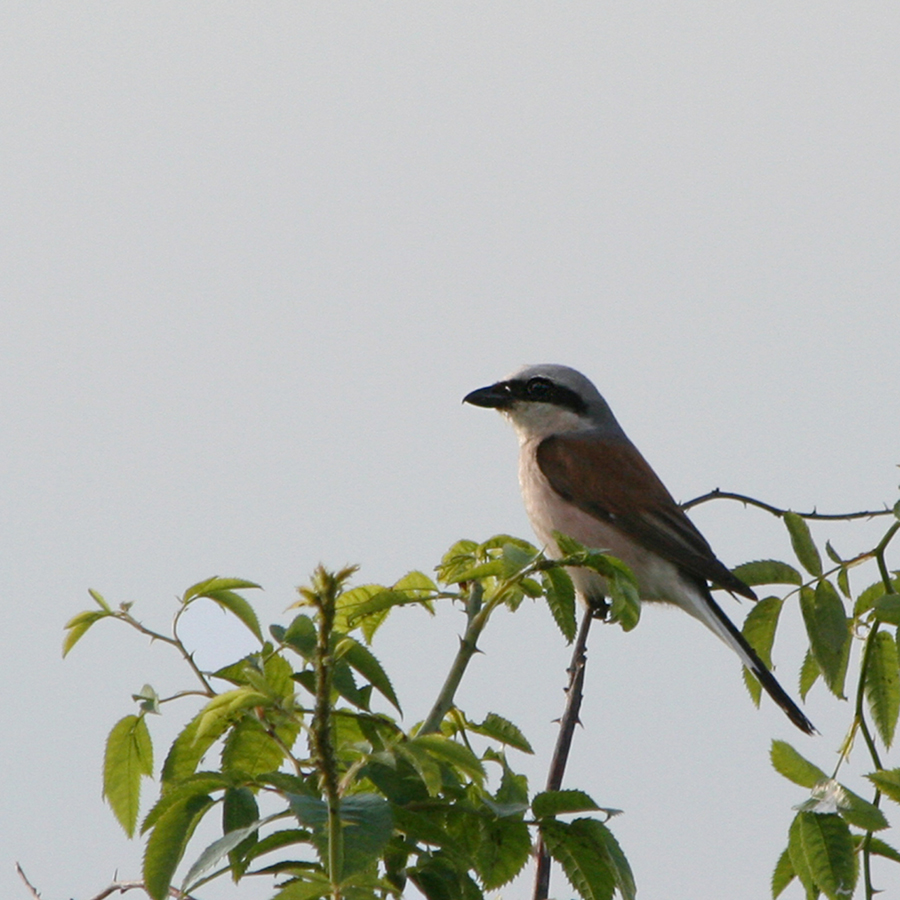
Red-backed shrike.

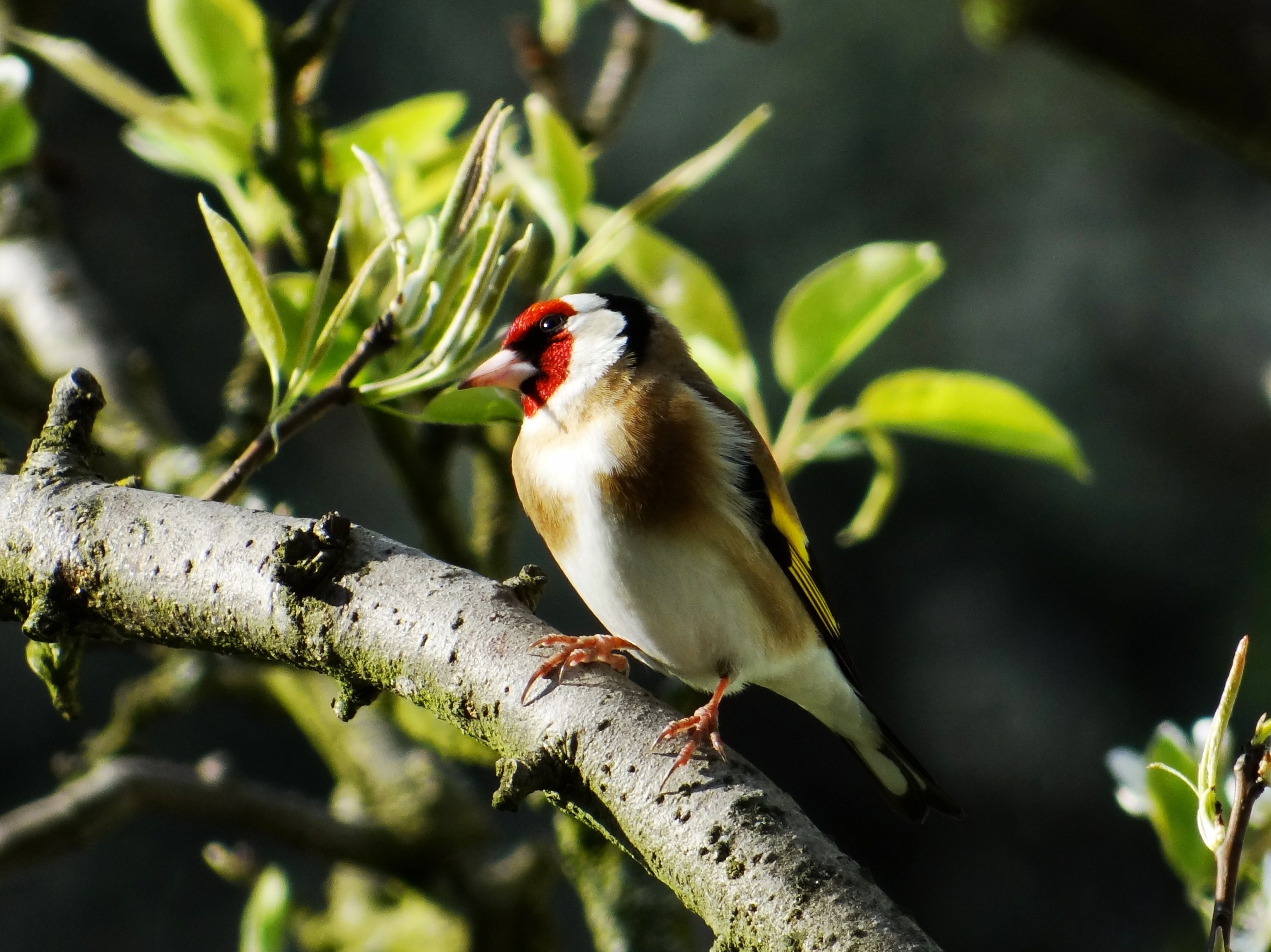
European goldfinch.

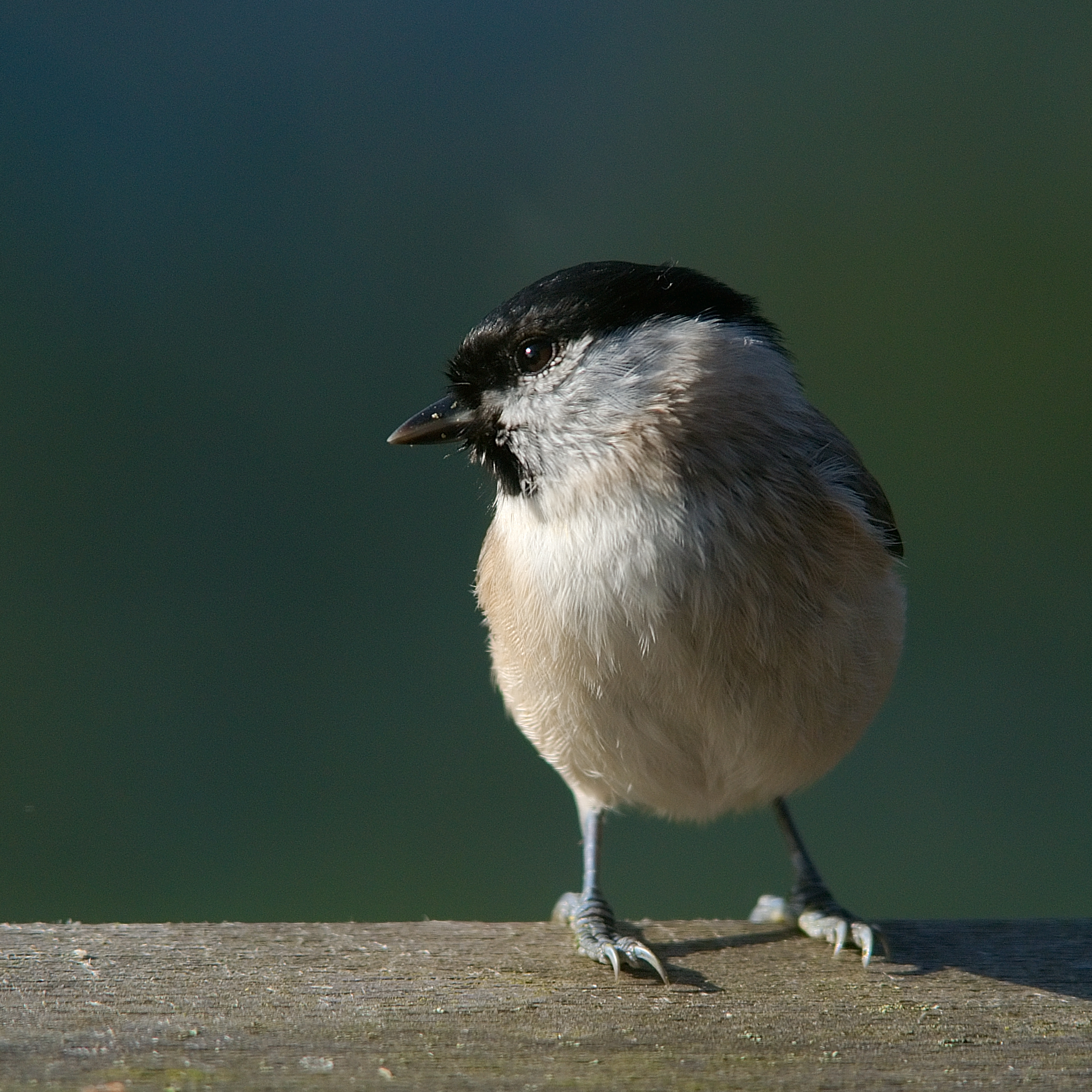
Marsh tit.

== Culture and heritage ==
=== Visits ===
The Ardennes Regional Natural Park is a popular destination for tourists, accessible via the Trans-Ardennes Greenway, a cycle touring path along the Meuse River, as well as cyclocross trails that traverse forests and slopes. Additionally, hiking trails are marked out for walkers.

=== Heritage ===
This region has historically been a frontier zone, with the Ardennes forest serving as a natural boundary. The region's hills and valleys have been inhabited since prehistoric times, as evidenced by the presence of dolmens and burial chambers, such as the covered alley at Giraumont. Over time, strategic locations were fortified. The ruins of Hierges Castle, Montcornet Castle, Linchamps Castle, and Château-Regnauld Fortress serve as tangible evidence of the medieval period. The Maipas Farm, situated on a perilous route between Aubenton and Mézières, represents another such vestige. In the 16th and 17th centuries, the region remained susceptible to internal conflicts, including religious wars and the Fronde, as well as external incursions. In response, a network of fortresses and fortified houses was constructed to reinforce the existing defensive structures. Examples of these structures include Fort Charlemont, the fortified house of Foisches, the Cour des Prés Castle in Rumigny, Remilly-les-Pothées Castle, and L'Échelle Castle.

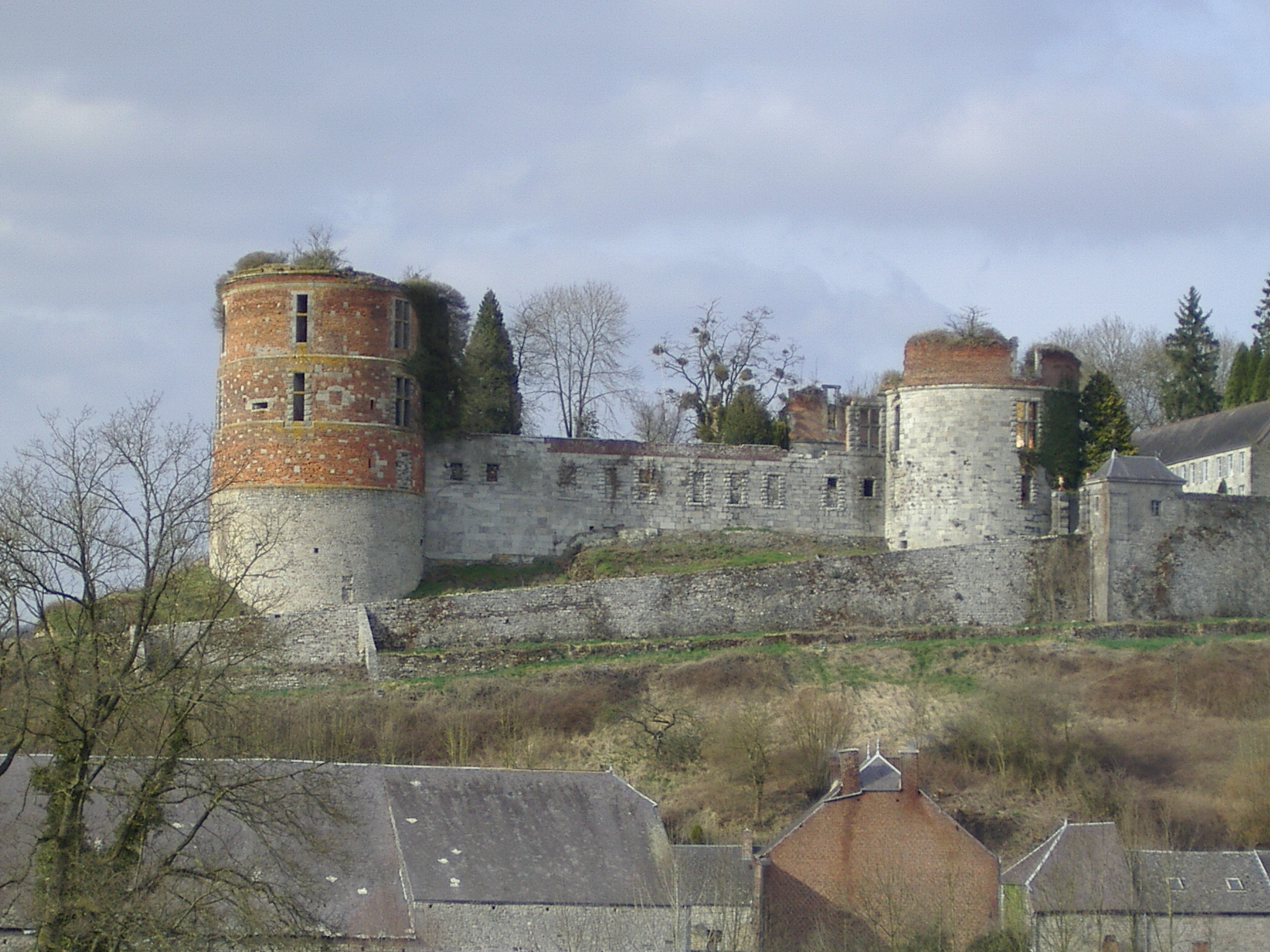
Hierges Castle.

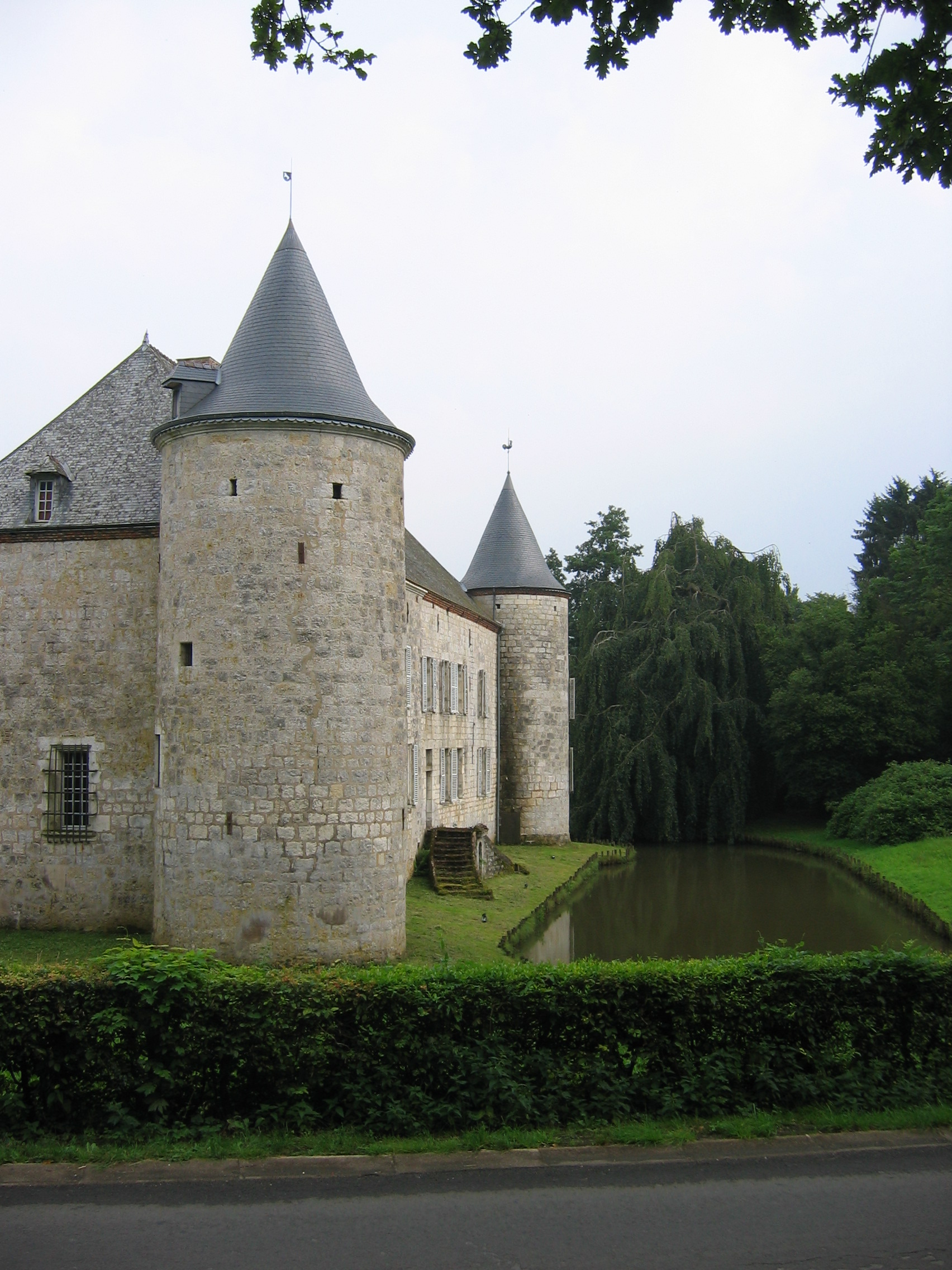
Cour des Prés Castle

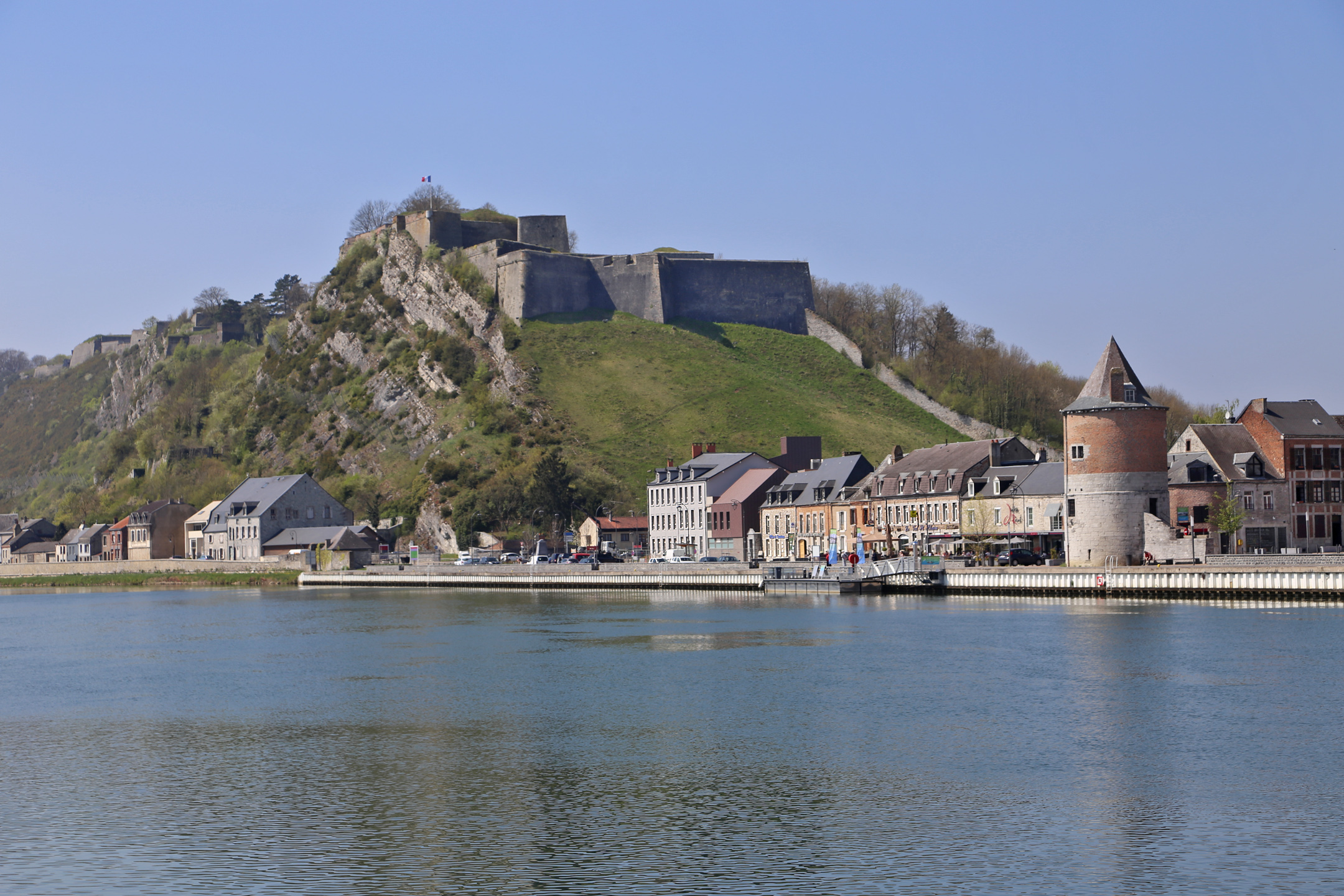
Fortress of Charlemont.

To protect themselves, the locals constructed fortified churches, particularly in the Thiérache Ardennaise region, including those in Cliron, Tournes, Signy-le-Petit, Fligny, Tarzy, Bossus-lès-Rumigny, Antheny, Flaignes, Hannappes, Prez, and Liart. Additionally, churches were erected along the Meuse Valley, such as Saint-Léger Church in Monthermé.

The cities fortifications were strengthened, encouraged by the King of France and aided by engineers considered the most skilled in the kingdom. The star-shaped fortifications and urban planning of Rocroi integrate a guardhouse and an arsenal.

The architectural heritage of the region is further defined by the use of colors derived from the region's mineral resources, which constitute an important aspect of the region's cultural identity. The architectural style of the region varies according to the landscape and is one of its most distinctive features. In the Ardennes Massif, slate roofs are a common sight, while the Givet Point is known for its blue stone. The Rocroi Plateau is characterized by cob and timber framing, while the Sormonne Valley features yellow limestone and brick. In the Thiérache Ardennaise, brick, and white limestone are the predominant materials. Another local peculiarity is the "beuquettes", which are openings used to throw out the water and to take a peek outside. This feature can be observed in houses in Haut-Buttés. (Note: La Beuquette is also the title of a daily column by writer Yanny Hureaux in the newspaper L'Ardennais.)

The legacy of artisanal and industrial activities is also significant, evident in the numerous workshops, former forges, factories, and owners' houses (sometimes located in seigneurial castles) that have left an imprint on the region. Additionally, the workers' homes, such as those in Laifour, at the entrance to the commune from Deville, in the place called Madagascar, the Paris-Campagne town in Revin, or the L'Échelle estate in Bogny-sur-Meuse, serve as tangible reminders of the region's industrial past.

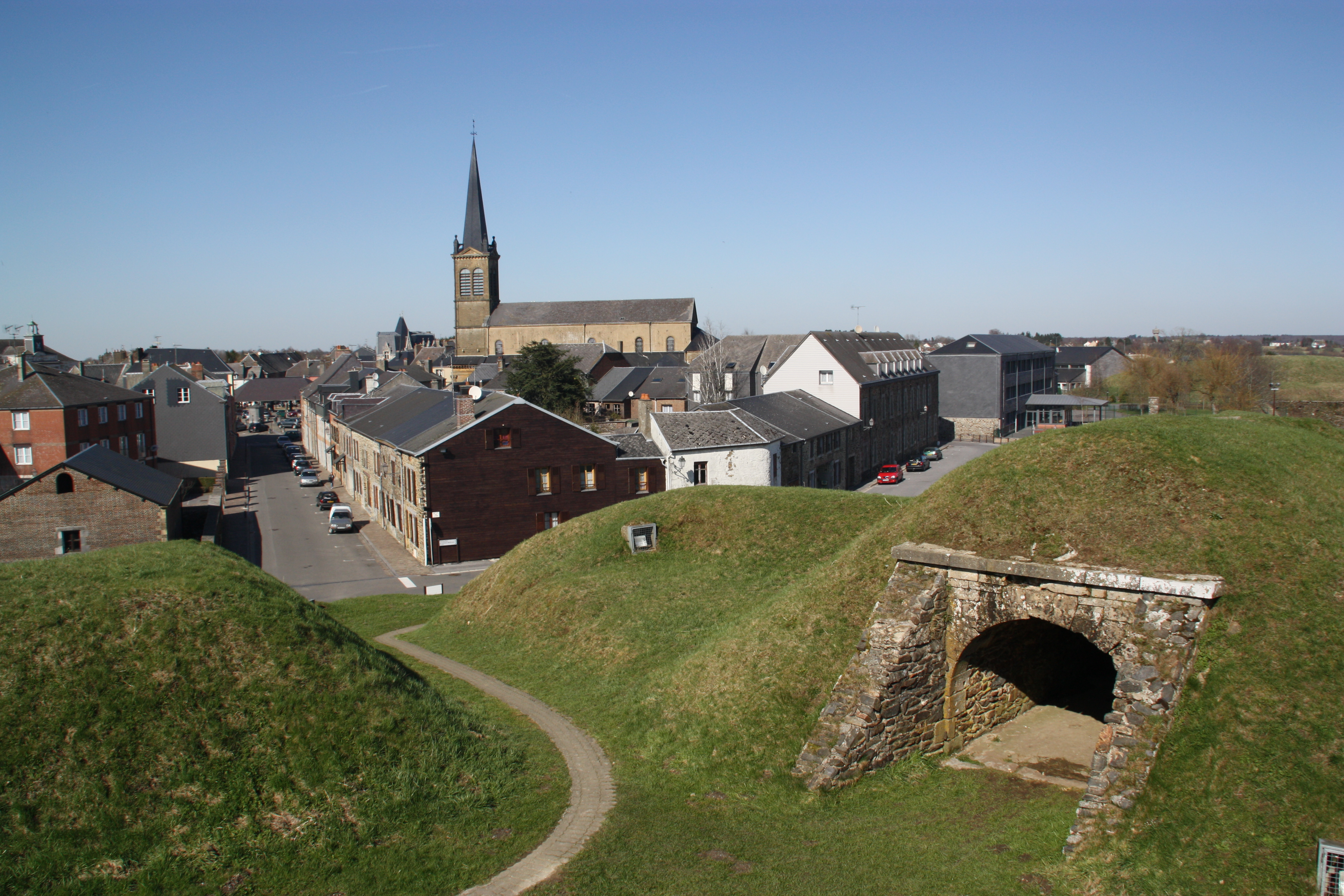
Ramparts and town of Rocroi.

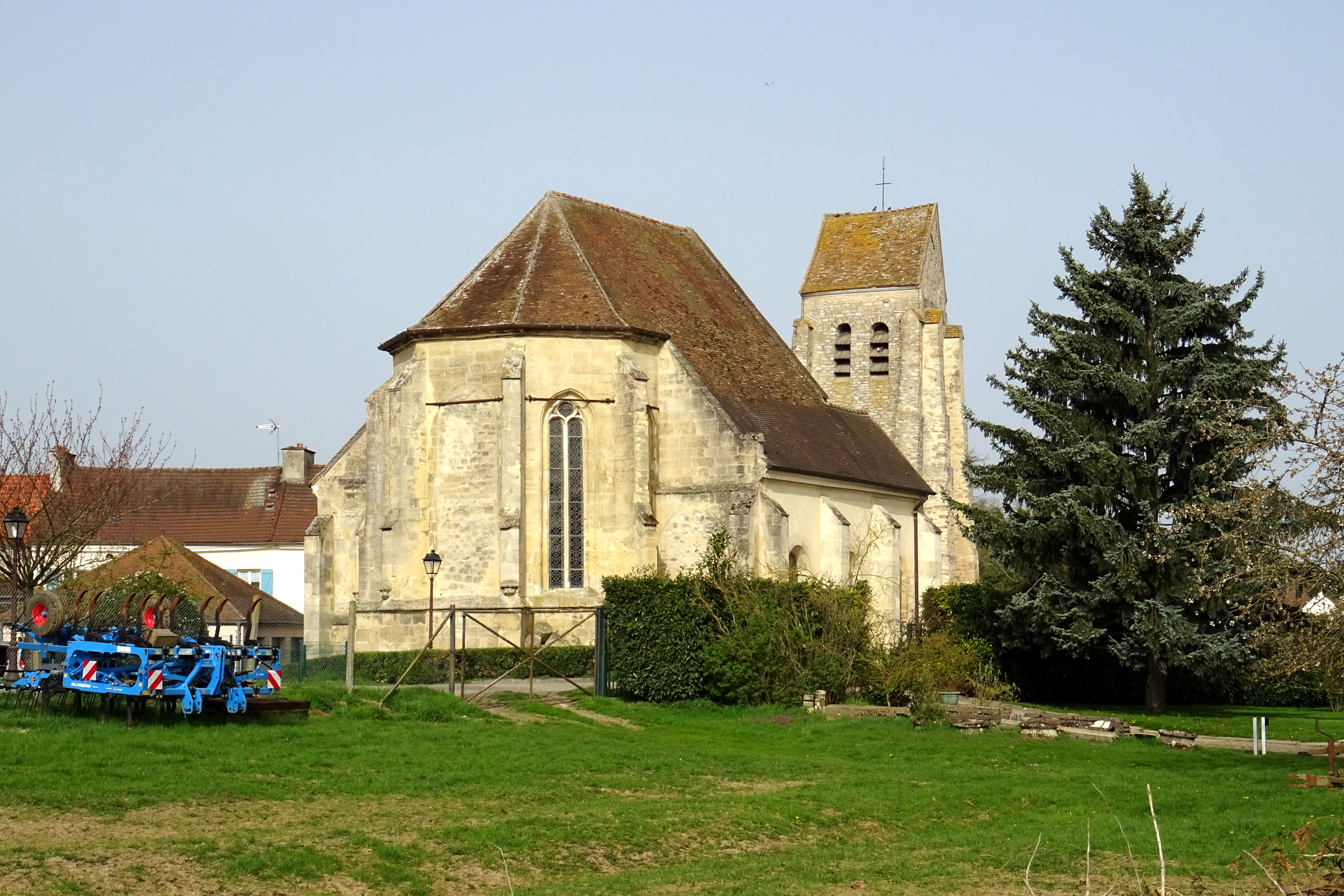
Saint-Léger Church in Monthermé.

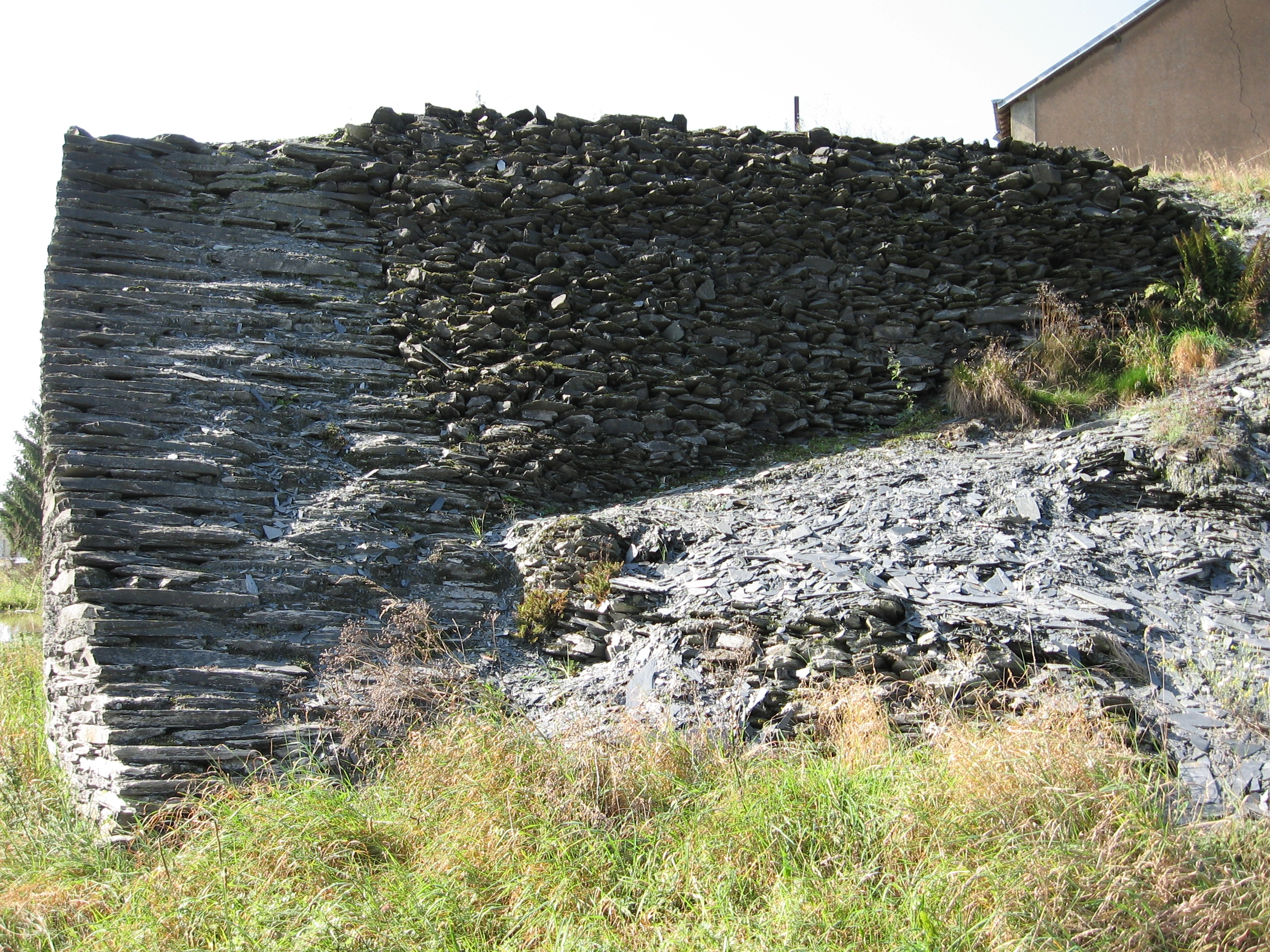
Detail of an old slate quarry wall in Rimogne.

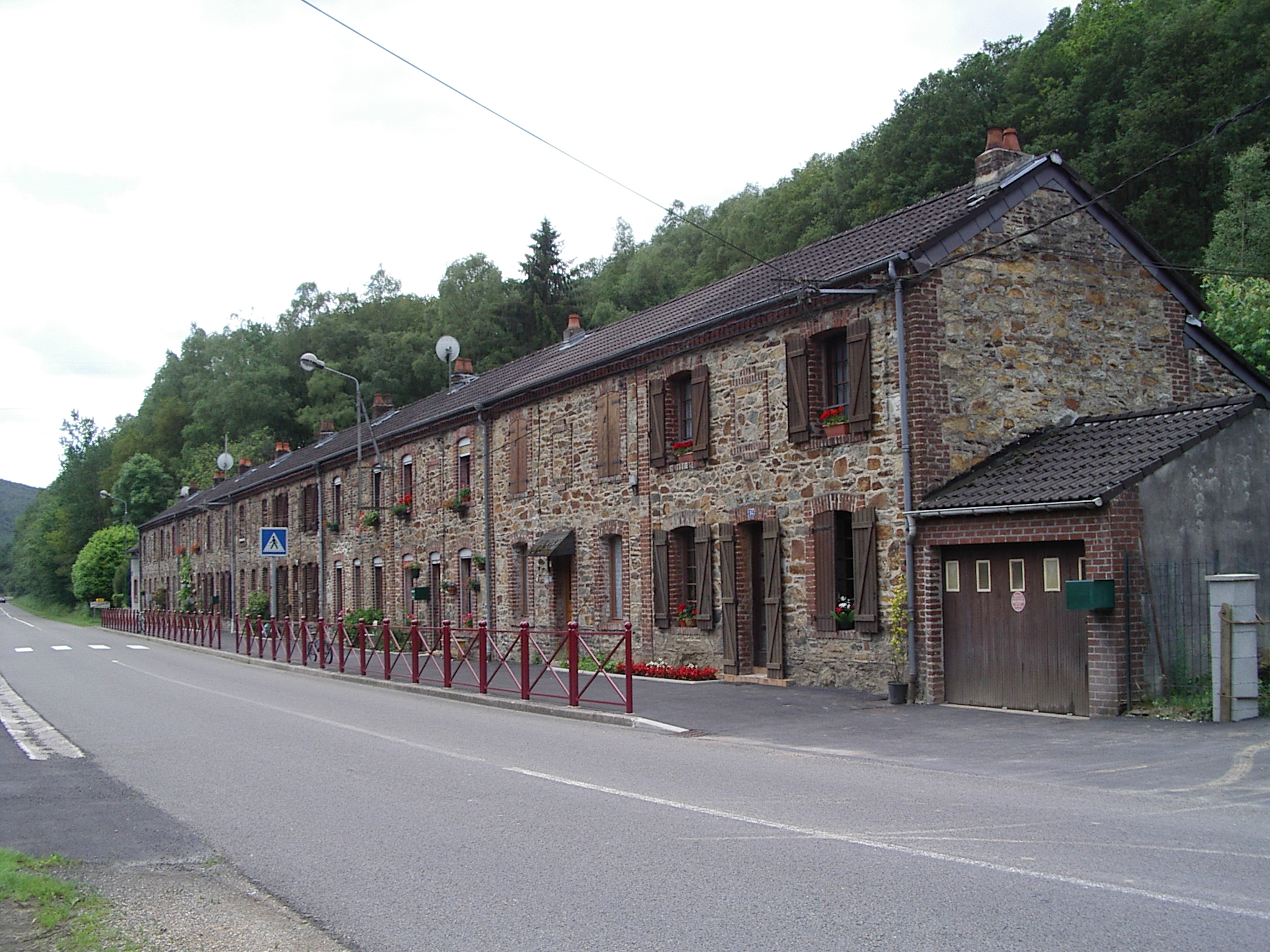
Workers' houses in Laifour.

The culinary heritage of the Ardennes Regional Natural Park encompasses a variety of fish and game dishes, which are available in inns situated along the Trans-Ardennes Greenway. Additionally, the region is known for its hearty dishes originating from the Meuse Valley, which have been shaped by a long-autarkic economy. These include cacasse à cul nu and Ardennes bacon salad. One might consider following the example of Georges Simenon, (Note: Georges Simenon traveled down the Meuse Valley in 1929, on his boat, making multiple stops. (Refer to the work of Maudhuy 1999).) who conducted meticulous research on traditional Ardennes cuisine, small restaurants, and dining tables in the Meuse Valley. Additionally, one could visit the farmers' markets in Renwez or Maubert-Fontaine, gain access to farm inns, appreciate the local varieties of fruit trees, and interact with various breeders, such as those raising the red Ardennes turkey in Auge and its surrounding area.

Two conservatory orchards have been established by the regional park, one in Haybes near the hiking center and another in Liart in the vicinity of the educational farm. A diverse array of apple, pear, plum, and cherry trees have been cultivated, encompassing varieties such as the "petit croquet" apple, the "noberte simple" plum, and the "chandeleur" pear.

=== A land of legends and literature ===
For me, the Ardennes is one of those landscape histories: it wouldn’t speak as strongly to my imagination when I revisit and cross it if it didn't overlay the only image of the Hercynian forest, pathless and boundless, we’ve retained, with that of the Teutoburg Forest, unsettling in its silences, three times burdened with the legions of Arminius.

— Julien Gracq, Carnets du grand chemin

For an extended period, this territory was characterized by oral tradition and legendary narratives. These include the Dames of the Meuse, the Four Sons of Aymon on their horse Bayard, and the enchanter Maugris, who bestowed his name upon the village of Noyers-Pont-Maugis. According to oral tradition, the region's woodlands, ravines, bogs, and caves are said to be inhabited by a variety of supernatural beings, including nutons, fairies, Pie-Pie-Van-Vans, Couzziettis, and Hututu. "As a child in my native Ardennes, I was fascinated by tales and legends", states Pierre Dubois, author, and founder of elficology, who hails from Charleville-Mézières. This legendary world serves as a source of inspiration for the inhabitants, with its narrative traditions dating back to the 19th and early 20th centuries, as documented by journalist Albert Meyrac, followed by writer Charles Gailly de Taurines and illustrator Georges Delaw. These traditions continue to the present day through the work of Pierre Dubois and Hervé Gourdet. A biennial festival, Le Printemps des Légendes, was established in Monthermé to preserve the oral tradition and legends associated with the region. This festival is accompanied by a Center for Legends and Elficology in Ardennes, located in a high-altitude hamlet called Les Hauts-Buttés. The center serves to maintain the cultural heritage of the region through the study and promotion of its legends and fairy tales.

In the 19th century, other writers concentrated on evoking these legends, as well as the landscapes, geology, and history of these lands. In 1842, Victor Hugo, en route to the Rhine, took the opportunity to recount his experiences in Givet, the Charlemont rock, and the surrounding landscapes in a letter imbued with a touch of humor. In 1868, Théophile Gautier provided a detailed account of an exploratory journey along the Meuse, likening the experience to traversing a river in the New World during its most remote reaches. He also described the four valiant knights mounted on the horse Bayard and, in other parts of the same river, was astonished by the significant forges and industrial activity. In 1869, George Sand undertook two journeys in the Ardennes region, stopping at the same inn in Givet as Victor Hugo and Théophile Gautier. She utilized her notes for a short story published the following year, entitled Malgrétout. In 1875, Jules Michelet, with familial ties to the small town of Renwez, notably recommended in his Tableau de la France to "visit the solitudes of Laifour and the black rocks of the Lady of the Meuse, the table of the enchanter Maugis, and the indelible imprint left in the rock by the foot of Renaud's horse." In the same decade, Arthur Rimbaud, while critical of his hometown, "the atrocious Charlestown", (Note: Charlestown is his hometown, Charleville.) dedicated several poems to his extensive travels across this region. These include the renowned Ma Bohème. In the following century, we must also mention Julien Gracq, who transposed his strange war from Lorraine to the Ardennes forest in Balcony in the Forest, with the town of Monthermé serving as the model for Moriarmé. Additionally, Yanny Hureaux, who is closely associated with the village of Gespunsart, is a noteworthy figure. Franz Bartelt, who has proposed the establishment of a museum dedicated to Ardennes bacon salad, and André Velter are also of interest. In a similar vein, the latter author wrote about Henri Michaux, noting that the two were both born in the Ardennes region, with Michaux residing on the Belgian side and the author on the French side. The author further observed that Michaux spoke to him about the identity of the Ardennes region. I would never have imagined Michaux concerned with such an original triviality, and I believe he found my astonishment amusing. He evoked the soil, the eroded, primary mountains, like barges bogged down in sedimentary deposits at high altitudes, and the exasperation of being in such an environment. He also described the temptation to leave in any direction.

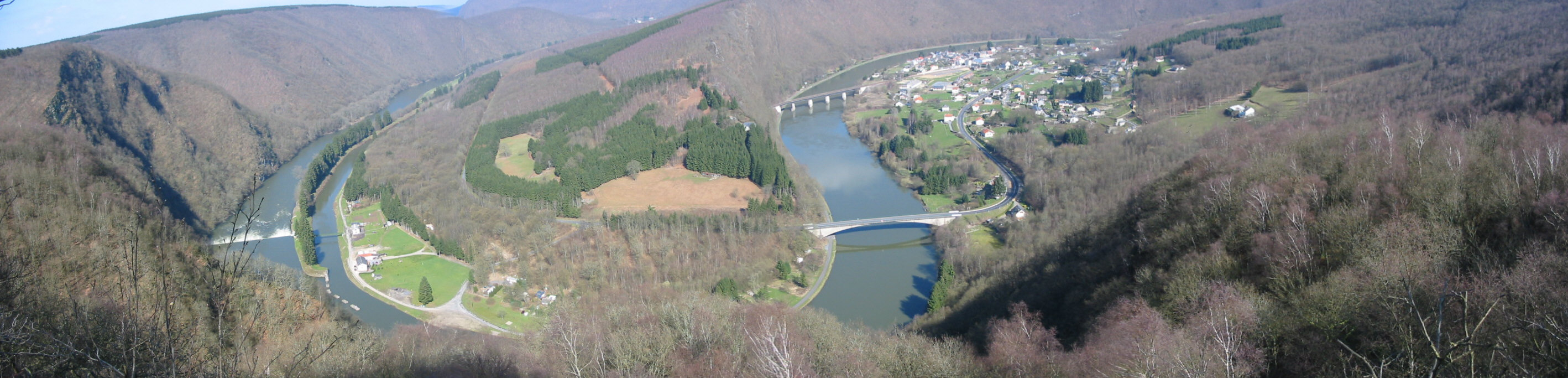
Ardennes forest and Meuse valley, Laifour.

== Main publications of the park ==
Most of these publications are available on the park's website for download.

- Information bulletin for the inhabitants of the Park.
- Map of the mountain biking trails of the Meuse and Semoy valleys 2013.
- Bulletin for Elected Officials and Partners, Esprit Parc.
- Natura 2000 Bulletin.
- Map of the Ardennes Regional Natural Park.
- Flowering Guide.
- Habitat Guide.
- Bird Guide of the territory.
- Bocage Guide.
- Orchard meetings.
- Environmental Education.
- Habitat Council program.
- Program of Farmers’ Markets in Maubert-Fontaine and Renwez.

== See also ==
- Regional nature parks of France
- Ardennes

== Bibliography ==
=== Works cited by date of publication ===
- Faure, Benoît (2011). Faure à Revin; petite histoire familiale et industrielle (in French). Paris: Éditions L'Harmattan. ISBN 978-2-296-13653-3.
- Bennani, Maya; Decrock, Bruno; Griot, François; Marasi, Julien (2009). Patrimoine industriel des Ardennes (in French). Langres: Éditions Dominique Guéniot. ISBN 978-2-87825-458-7.
- Ridou, Jean-Lou (2007). Thiérache, terre d'oiseaux (in French). Groupe Bayard. ISBN 978-2-915216-19-6.
- Craissati, Marie Noëlle (2004). Sur les pas des écrivains : Balade dans les Ardennes (in French). Éditions Alexandrines. ISBN 2-912319-31-5.
  - Dubois, Pierre. "La forêt des Ardennes ou l'âge d'or des légendes". Sur les pas des écrivains. pp. 27–31.
  - Brunel, Pierre. "Arthur Rimbaud ou le « cosmorama Arduan »". Sur les pas des écrivains. pp. 27–31.
  - Mauprat, André (2004). "Yanny Hureaux, un écrivain dans sa clairière". Sur les pas des écrivains. pp. 65–71.
  - Carn, Hervé. "Julien Gracq. Une journée d'automne". Sur les pas des écrivains. pp. 117–120.
  - Bertrand, Alain. "Franz Bartelt. Nulle part, mais en Ardennes". Sur les pas des écrivains. pp. 149–154.
  - Bartelt, Franz (2004). "Salade de printemps". Sur les pas des écrivains. pp. 155–160.
  - Dardart, Gérald. "Jules Michelet et l'histoire, une rencontre ardennaise". Sur les pas des écrivains. pp. 161–165.
  - Borer, Alain (2004). "Velter, ou l'Ardennaute". Sur les pas des écrivains. p. 199.
- Desbrière, Michel (2003). Chronique critique des lignes de défense de la Champagne septentrionale 1644-1748 (in French). Charleville-Mézières: Éditions Terres Ardennaises. ISBN 2-905339-59-4.
- Conseil national des arts culinaires (2000). Champagne-Ardenne, produits du terroir et recettes traditionnelles : L'inventaire du patrimoine culinaire de la France (in French). Paris: Éditions Albin Michel. p. 147. ISBN 2-226-11516-1.
- Maudhuy, Roger (1999). La vallée, de la place ducale à Givet (in French). Éditions Les cerises aux loups. p. 103. ISBN 2-913275-07-9.
- Moxhet, Albert (1989). Ardenne et Bretagne, les sœurs lointaines (in French). Mardaga.
- Pinçon, Michel (1987). Désarrois ouvriers : familles de métallurgistes dans les mutations industrielles et sociales (in French). Paris: L'Harmattan. ISBN 2-85802-807-9. Archived from the original on August 12, 2025.
- Lambot, Jean-Pierre (1987). L'Ardenne (in French). Liège/Brussels: Mardaga. ISBN 2-87009-316-0.
- Voisin, Léon (1987). Les Ardoisières de l'Ardenne (in French). Charleville-Mézières: Éditions Terres Ardennaises. ISBN 2-905339-06-3.
- Fontaine, Marguerite (1969). Les Vieux Moulins de Thilay, haut-lieu de la résistance ardennaise (in French). Éditions de la Société des Écrivains Ardennais.
- Manceau, Henri (1964). Les Ardennes : Villes et villages de notre temps. L'Automobiliste ardennais (in French). Centre départemental de documentation pédagogique des Ardennes.
- Guelliot, Octave (1931). Géographie traditionnelle et populaire du département des Ardennes (in French). Librairie Emile Nourry.
- Callay, Albert (1900). Catalogue raisonné et descriptif des plantes vasculaires du département des Ardennes (in French). Charleville: E. Jolly.
- Meyrac, Albert (1890). Traditions, coutumes, légendes et contes des Ardennes, comparés avec les traditions, légendes et contes de divers pays (in French). Imprimerie du Petit Ardennais.
- Toupet des Vignes, Edmond; de Montagnac, Élizé (1868). Les Ardennes Illustrées. Givet et Charlemont (in French). Vol. 1. Éditions Hachette. pp. 109–113.
- Gautier, Théophile; Montagnac, Élizé de (1868). Les Ardennes Illustrées. Voyage sur la Meuse (in French). Vol. 1. Éditions Hachette. pp. 115–133.
- Buvignier, Nicolas-Armad; Sauvage, François Clément (1842). Statistiques minéralogiques et géologiques du département des Ardennes (in French). Mézières: Trécourt imprimeur. Archived from the original on August 13, 2025.
- de La Fons de Mélicocq, Alexandre (1839). Botanique ou prodrome de la flore des arrondissements de Laon, Vervins, Rocroix et des environs de Noyon (in French). Archived from the original on August 12, 2025.

=== Main articles cited by date of publication ===
- Amir-Tahmasseb, Grégoire (February 5, 2012). "Les Ardennes s'offrent le 47e parc naturel de France". L'Union (in French).
- Lévy, Guillaume (January 27, 2012). "Nathalie Kosciusko-Morizet inaugure le PNR des Ardennes". L'Union (in French).
- Kassous, Robert (January 26, 2012). "Nouveau Parc Naturel Régional". Le Nouvel Obs (in French). Archived from the original on September 25, 2024.
- M.S (October 14, 2011). "Parc naturel régional : l'association des Amis du PNR bien lancée". L'Union (in French).
- Livoreil, Mathieu (February 9, 2011). "Dernière ligne droite pour le Parc naturel régional". L'Union (in French).
- Gospodinova, Irina (2011). "Le marais des Hauts Buttés (Ardennes)". L'Écho des tourbières, publication de la Fédération des conservatoires d'espaces naturels (in French) (19): 11. ISSN 1286-031X.
- Dargent, Frank (2011). "Bas-marais et tourbières acides des Ardennes". L'Écho des tourbières, publication de la Fédération des conservatoires d'espaces naturels (in French) (19): 9–11. ISSN 1286-031X.
- "La population au 1er janvier 2008 des territoires de Champagne-Ardenne". Institut national de la statistique et des études économiques (in French) (31). 2011. Archived from the original on December 19, 2018.
- "Dossier : le port de Givet. Vers la reconquête". Ardenne Économique, publication de la Chambre de Commerce et d'Industrie des Ardennes (in French) (36): 14–17. 2010.
- Guillet, Perrine (December 22, 2009). "Parc Naturel Régional en Ardenne : « une vraie étape franchie »". L'Union (in French).
- Guillet, Perrine (September 19, 2008). "Ardennes : Parc naturel régional : « 18 mois pour réussir »". L'Union (in French).
- Mateo, Pascal; Singer, Ariane (2004). "Les rails de la relance". Le Point (in French). Archived from the original on 2024-09-25.
- Roussel, Frédérique (November 27, 2003). "L'affaire Elfe". Libération (in French). Archived from the original on September 24, 2024.
- Colinet, René (1991). "Histoire industrielle, patrimoine industriel en Ardenne du Nord : bilan et perspectives. (Suivi d'un autre article sur les Ardennes vues par la nouvelle géographie)". Société d'histoire des Ardennes (in French). XXVI: 201–209.
- Ryelandt, Christophe (1967). "Un parc naturel de la forêt des Ardennes". La Grive (in French) (131): 13–16.
- Mouze, Michel (1972). "Le climat des Ardennes". Bulletin de la Société d'histoire naturelle des Ardennes (in French). 79e Année, t. 61: 9–17.
- Cros, Vitalis (1961). "Ardennes, Introduction". Revue historique des armées (in French). 17e Année (2): 121–124. ISSN 0035-3299.
- Noiret (1961). "La Marche ardennaise". Revue historique des armées (in French). 17e Année (2): 125–129. ISSN 0035-3299.
- Ryelandt, Christophe (1953). "Malgrétout. George Sand et les Ardennes". La Grive (in French): 1–29. ISSN 1153-6381. Archived from the original on September 25, 2024.
- Vaillant, Jean-Paul (1929). "Les livres du pays. La féérie ardennaise". L'Esprit français (in French): 100–101. ISSN 1153-6381. Archived from the original on September 25, 2024.
- France, Anatole (September 28, 1890). "La Vie littéraire". Le Temps (in French). p. 2. Archived from the original on September 25, 2024.

=== Web sources ===
- "Ethologie Hauts-Buttés. Compte rendu d'un week-end aux Hauts-Buttés (France) pour la formation en éthologie (Natagora). 18 et 19 juin 2011". nature.silver-it (in French). Archived from the original on March 7, 2016.
- "Le projet de parc naturel régional des Ardennes". PNR des Ardennes (in French). Archived from the original on March 1, 2017.
  - "Rapport de charte du parc naturel régional des Ardennes - Objectif 2023" (PDF). Archived from the original on October 25, 2015.
  - "Les données-clés". Archived from the original on March 23, 2016.
- "Le territoire - La nature". PNR des Ardennes (in French). Archived from the original on March 1, 2017.
  - "Les tourbières". Archived from the original on December 26, 2010.
  - "Les landes tourbeuses". Archived from the original on December 26, 2010.
  - "Les pelouses sèches". Archived from the original on December 26, 2010.
  - "Les escarpements rocheux". Archived from the original on December 26, 2010.
  - "La forêt". Archived from the original on December 26, 2010.
  - "Le bocage". Archived from the original on December 26, 2010.
- "Inventaire national du patrimoine naturel". INPN (in French). Archived from the original on December 1, 2024.
  - "Liste des sites de l'inventaire ZNIEFF. Champagne-Ardenne". Archived from the original on November 11, 2023.
  - "ZNIEFF 210020014 - Anciennes ardoisières de Monthermé et de Deville". Archived from the original on January 3, 2022.
  - "ZNIEFF 210020039 - Prairies oligotrophes et petits bois de la Sormonne au nord-est d'Eteignières". Archived from the original on January 20, 2025.
  - "Boloria aquilonaris". Archived from the original on April 6, 2023.
