= Neuville =

Neuville may refer to:

== Communes in France ==
=== Auvergne-Rhône-Alpes ===
- Neuville-les-Dames, in the Ain département
- Neuville-sur-Ain, in the Ain département
- Neuville, Puy-de-Dôme, in the Puy-de-Dôme département
- Neuville-sur-Saône, in the Rhône département

=== Bourgoigne-Franche-Comté ===
- Neuville-lès-Decize, in the Nièvre département

=== Centre-Val de Loire ===
- Neuville-sur-Brenne, in the Indre-et-Loire département
- Neuville-aux-Bois, in the Loiret département

=== Grand Est ===
- Neuville-Day, in the Ardennes département
- Neuville-lès-This, in the Ardennes département
- Neuville-lez-Beaulieu, in the Ardennes département
- Neuville-sur-Seine, in the Aube département
- Neuville-sur-Vannes, in the Aube département
- Neuville-en-Verdunois, in the Meuse département
- Neuville-lès-Vaucouleurs, in the Meuse département
- Neuville-sur-Ornain, in the Meuse département

=== Hauts-de-France ===
- Neuville-Saint-Amand, in the Aisne département
- Neuville-sur-Ailette, in the Aisne département
- Neuville-sur-Margival, in the Aisne département
- Neuville-en-Avesnois, in the Nord département
- Neuville-en-Ferrain, in the Nord département
- Neuville-Saint-Rémy, in the Nord département
- Neuville-sur-Escaut, in the Nord département
- Neuville-Bosc, in the Oise département
- Neuville-au-Cornet, in the Pas-de-Calais département
- Neuville-Bourjonval, in the Pas-de-Calais département
- Neuville-Saint-Vaast, in the Pas-de-Calais département
- Neuville-sous-Montreuil, in the Pas-de-Calais département
- Neuville-Vitasse, in the Pas-de-Calais département
- Neuville-au-Bois, in the Somme département
- Neuville-Coppegueule, in the Somme département
- Neuville-lès-Loeuilly, in the Somme département

=== Île-de-France ===
- Neuville-sur-Oise, in the Val-d'Oise département

=== Normandy ===
- Neuville-sur-Authou, in the Eure département
- Neuville-au-Plain, in the Manche département
- Neuville-en-Beaumont, in the Manche département
- Neuville-près-Sées, in the Orne département
- Neuville-sur-Touques, in the Orne département
- Neuville-Ferrières, in the Seine-Maritime département

=== Nouvelle-Aquitaine ===
- Neuville, Corrèze, in the Corrèze département
- Neuville-de-Poitou, in the Vienne département

=== Pays de la Loire ===
- Neuville-sur-Sarthe, in the Sarthe département

== Municipalities in Canada ==
- Neuville, Quebec, in Portneuf County (Quebec)

== People with the surname ==
- Alphonse-Marie-Adolphe de Neuville, French painter
- Oliver Neuville, German former footballer born in Switzerland
- Thierry Neuville, Belgian WRC driver
- Thomas M. Neuville (1950-2022), American politician and judge
- Valentin Neuville, French composer

== Other uses ==
- The Neuville, a historic apartment building in Chicago, Illinois, US

== See also ==
- La Neuville (disambiguation)
- Laneuville (disambiguation)
- Villeneuve (disambiguation)
