= Antheny =

- Commune
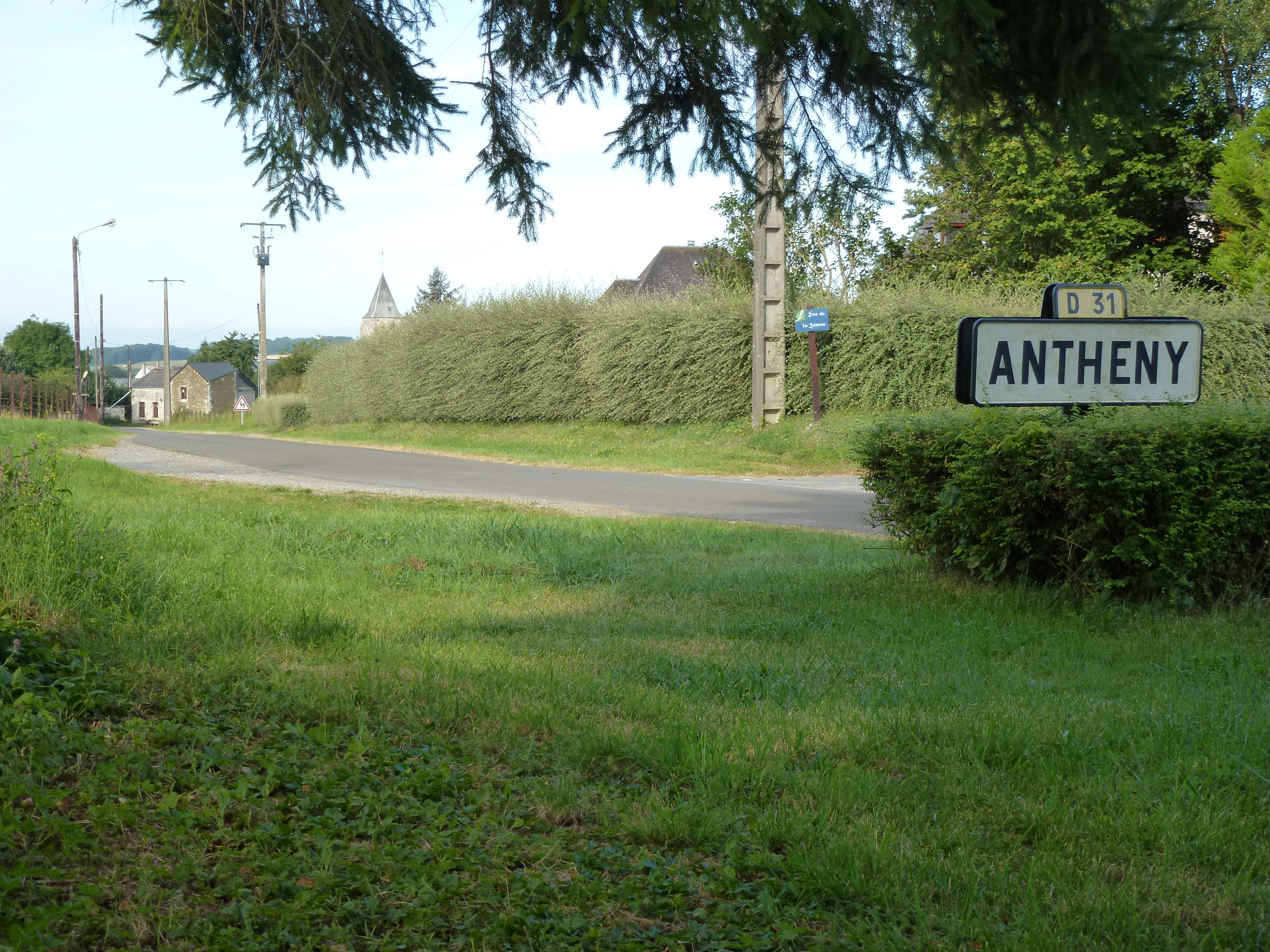
- Antheny

- Coat of arms
- Location of Antheny
- Location within France Location within Grand Est
- Coordinates: 49°50′57″N 4°18′48″E
- Country: France
- Region: Grand Est
- Department: Ardennes
- Arrondissement: Charleville-Mézières
- Canton: Signy-l'Abbaye
- Intercommunality: Ardennes Thiérache

Government
  - Mayor (2020–2026): Nathalie Gouverneur
- Area^{1}: 10.14 km^{2} (3.92 sq mi)
- Elevation: 216 m (709 ft)
- Population (2023): 100
  - Density: 9.9/km^{2} (26/sq mi)
- Time zone: UTC+01:00 (CET)
  - Summer (DST): UTC+02:00 (CEST)
- INSEE/Postal code: 08015 /08260
- ^{1} French Land Register data, which excludes lakes, ponds, glaciers > 1 km^{2} (0.386 sq mi or 247 acres) and river estuaries.

Antheny (French pronunciation: [ɑ̃tni]) is a commune in the Ardennes department in the Grand Est region of northern France.

The commune has been awarded one flower by the National Council of Towns and Villages in Bloom in the Competition of cities and villages in Bloom.

== Geography ==
Antheny is located some 40 km west by north-west of Charleville-Mézières and some 20 km east of Hirson. Access is by the D34 road from Tarzy in the north-west continuing through the village to Prez in the south-east. There is also the D31 road from Auvillers-les-Forges in the north-east also passing through the village and continuing south-west to Bossus-les-Rumigny. There is also the hamlet of Fontenelle south-west of the village on the D31. The rest of the commune is entirely farmland.

The Orvaux and the Ruisseau de Saint Remy flow from the north-east to the south-west joining near the village to form the Ton river which flows westwards to join the Oise near Étréaupont

== History ==
A statistic dated 1844 and written by Abbot Geoffrey, then the pastor of the town, said that the origin of the village was the result of an emigrant family from Italy. This family faced a major upheaval in their country (in the time of Charles Martel) and came to France to acquire a territory which covered the present communes of Antheny and Auge. They built a Motte-and-bailey castle in the current Antheny commune. They took as a surname: de la Motte d'Antheny. The last male descendant of this illustrious family died in L'Île-Bouchard on 21 October 1901 at the age of 3 years. Other branches of this family were born with the surnames d'Antheny and Dantheny.

The village was burned and looted many times: on 27 September 1521 by the Duke of Nassau who had been forced to raise the Siege of Mézières, again in 1638, then in 1643, and finally in 1653 by Spanish troops.

Antheny village also has a nearby hamlet of Fontenelle. The fortified house at Fontenelle was destroyed in 1559 by the men of the Count of Saint-Pol. Today there is an attractive Renaissance castle.

The church at Antheny is dedicated to Saint Remy who was Bishop of Reims and who baptized Clovis I. He possessed the territory of Pothées (near Antheny).

The early church dates from 1198 but very little remains: some Romanesque arches in the north wall. It has had several fires. The current building is the result of the restoration carried out in 1689.

The village still has some fortified farmhouses dating from the end of the 17th century.

=== Heraldry ===
Arms of Antheny	Blazon: Gules, two swords Argent saltirewise cantoned in chief and base with two roundels of Or; in chief the same charged with a fleur de lis in Vert flanked by two trefoils the same..

== Administration ==
List of Successive Mayors

From	To	Name
1995	2008	Jean-Pol Pinteaux
2008	2014	Alain Joris
2014	2020	Jean-Pol Pinteaux
2020	current	Nathalie Gouverneur

== Demography ==
Historical population

Year	Pop.	±% p.a.
1793	249	—
1821	301	+0.68%
1846	357	+0.68%
1872	347	−0.11%
1901	274	−0.81%
1926	222	−0.84%
1946	198	−0.57%
1962	186	−0.39%
1968	160	−2.48%

Year	Pop.	±% p.a.
1975	130	−2.92%
1982	107	−2.74%
1990	101	−0.72%
1999	108	+0.75%
2007	105	−0.35%
2012	109	+0.75%
2017	99	−1.91%
2023	100	+0.17%

Source: EHESS and INSEE

== Sites and Monuments ==
A Cemetery Cross (18th century) is registered as an historical monument.

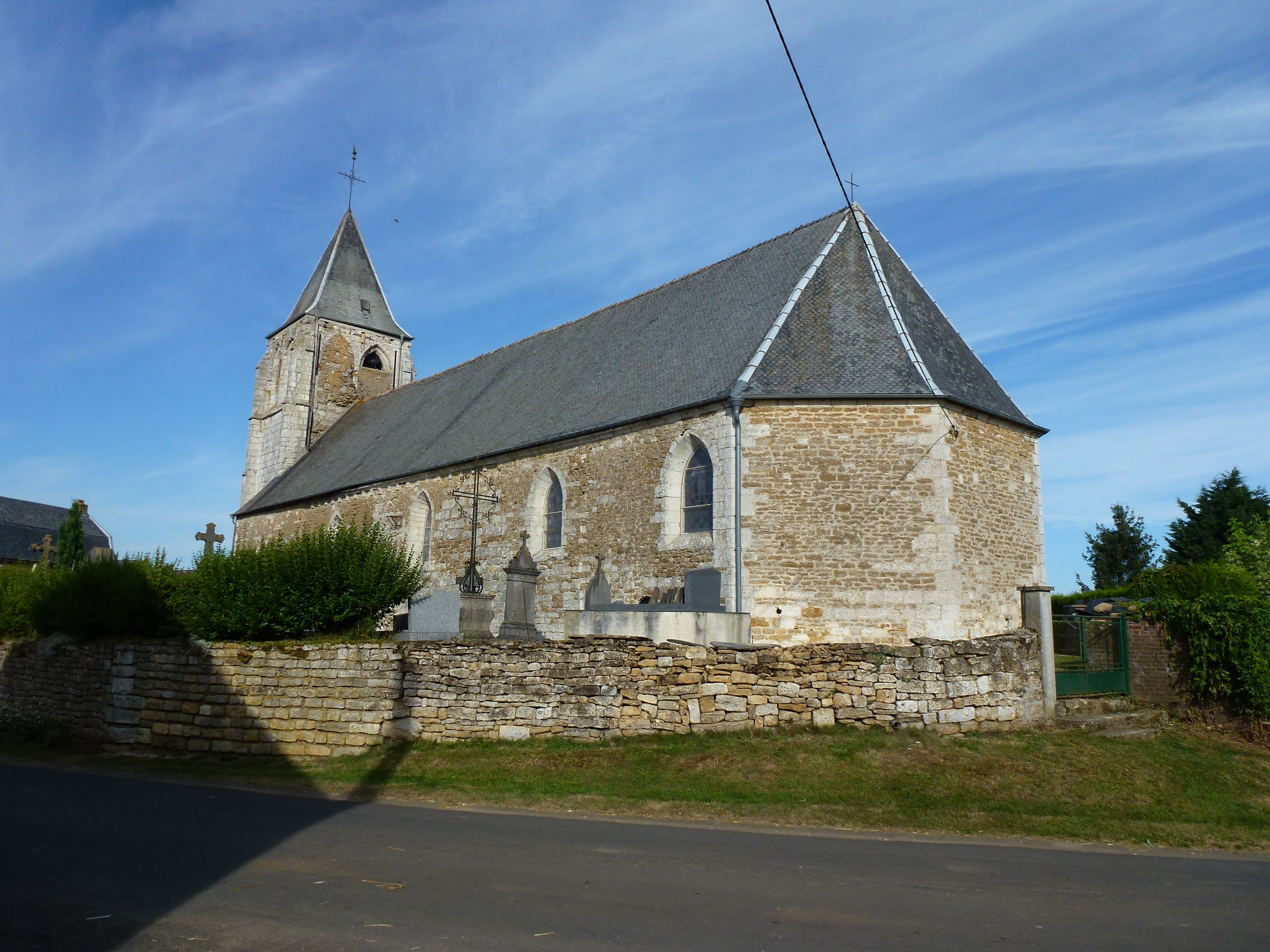
Church of Saint-Remy

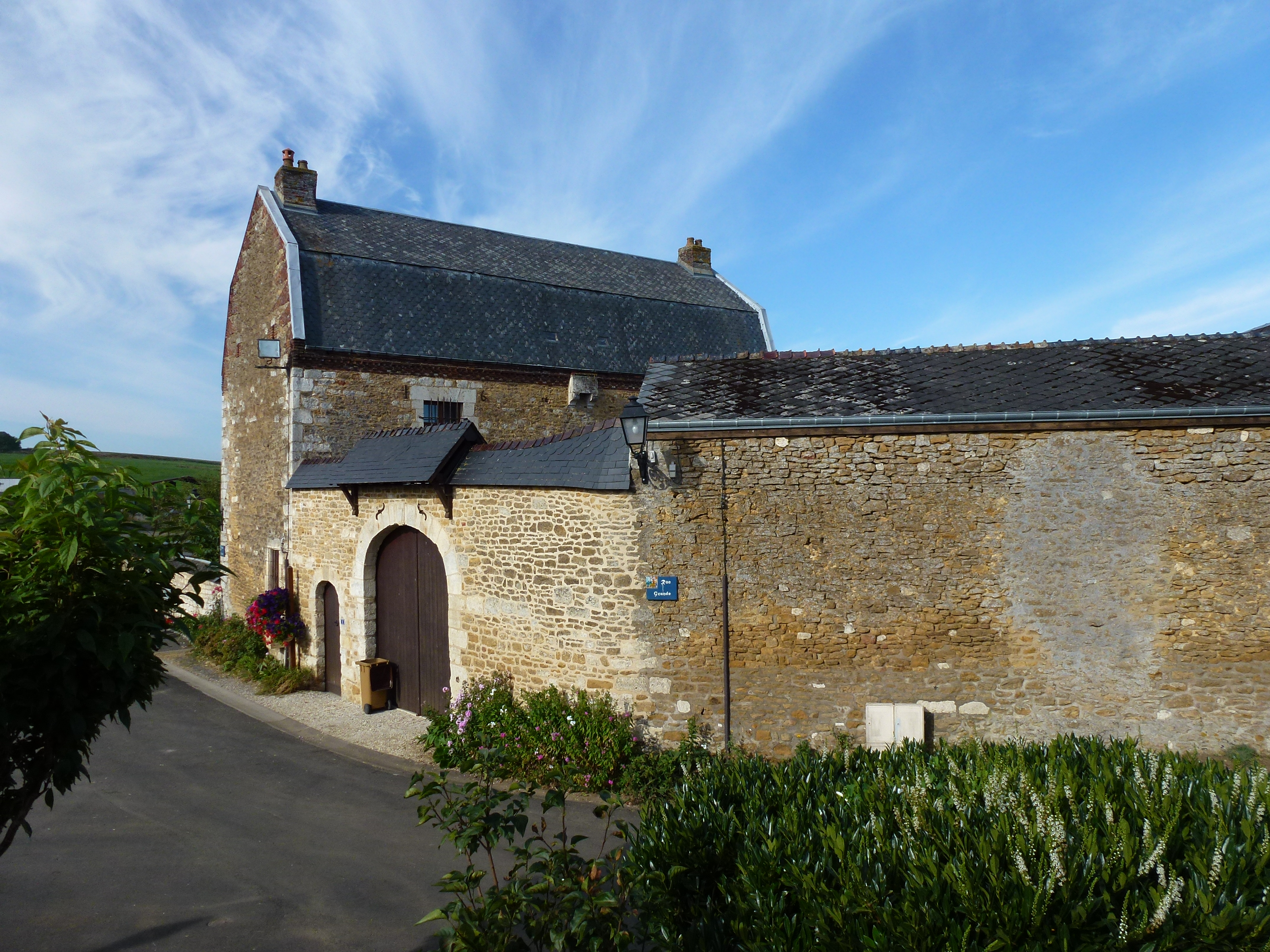
Fortified Farm

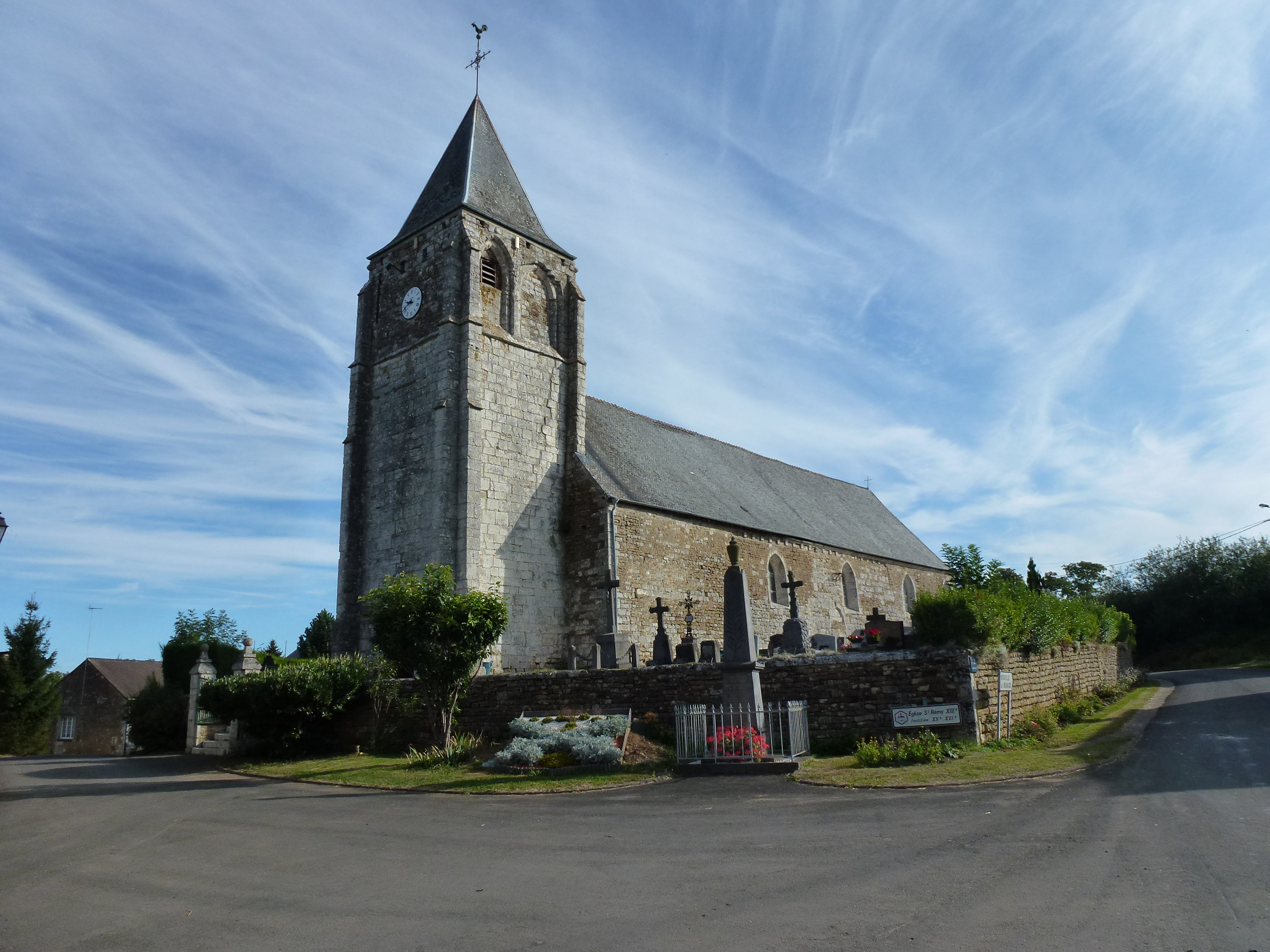
Church of Saint-Remy

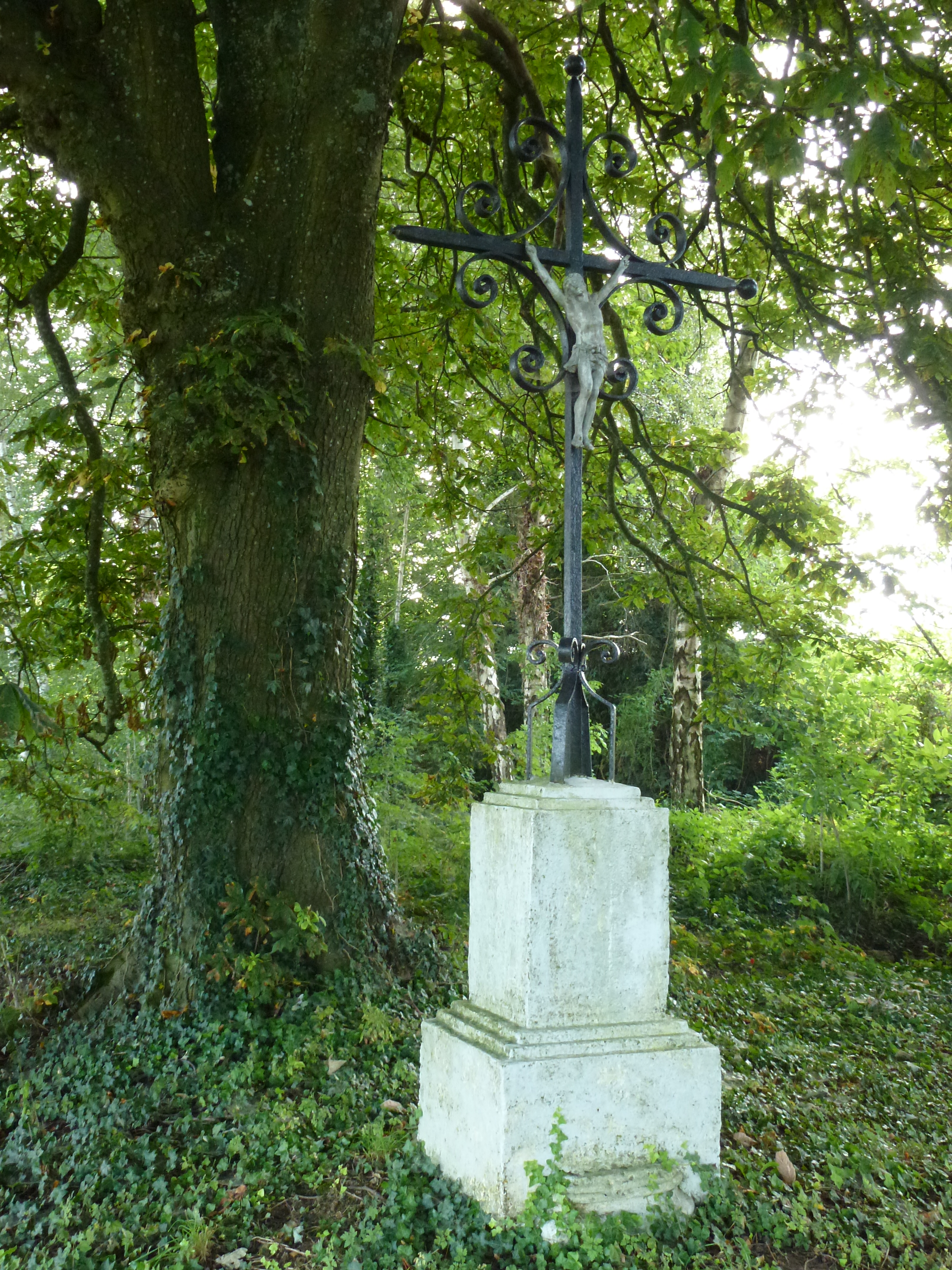
Wayside Cross

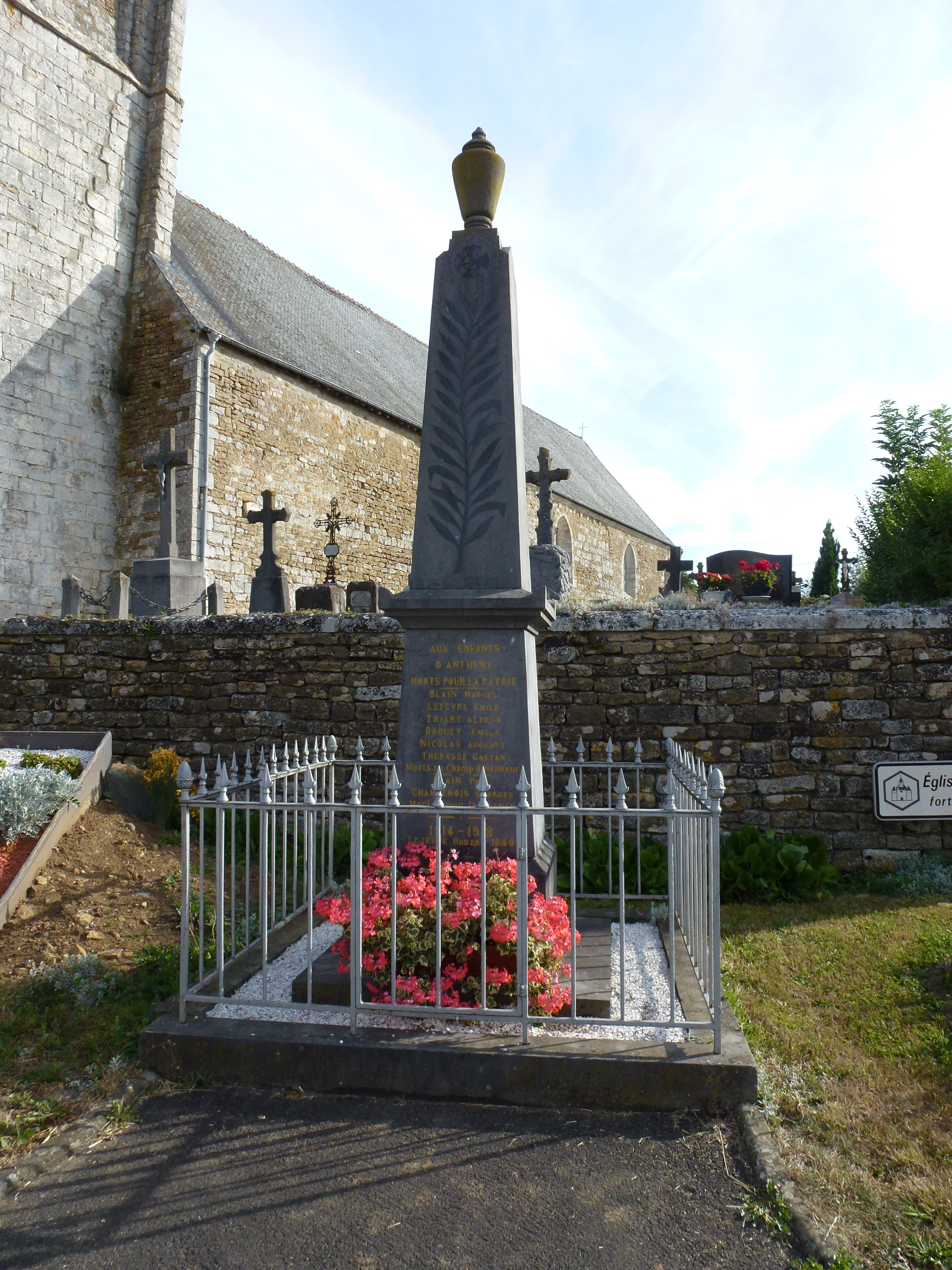
War Memorial

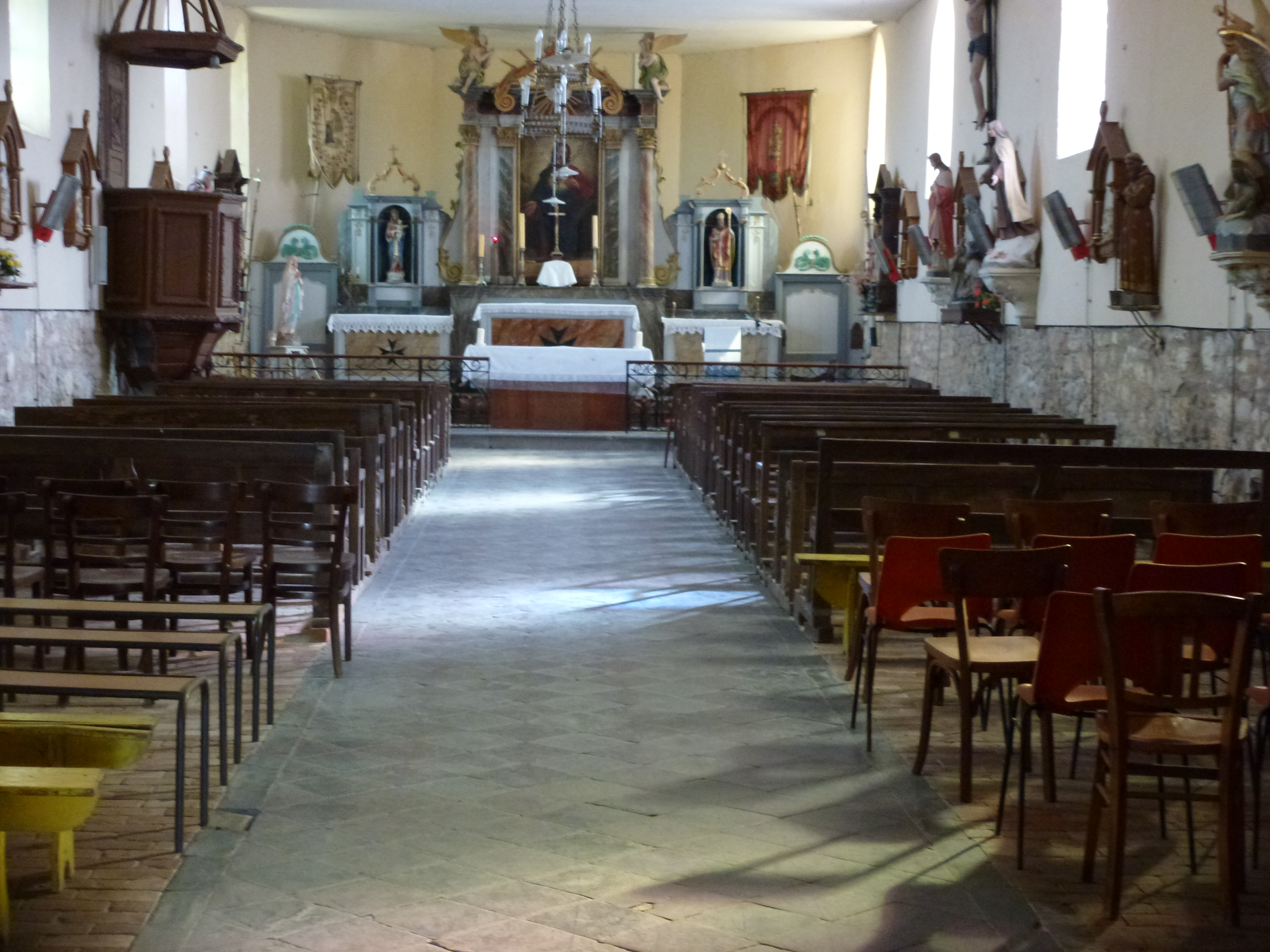
Church Interior

== Notable people linked to the commune ==
Commandant Louis François Louis Melin was born in Antheny on 8 December 1810. He was the commandant of the Place de Rocroi in 1870. His son Léonce was wounded before Belfort in 1870 and died in the ambulance. He belonged to the 14th Battalion of chasseurs.

== See also ==
- Communes of the Ardennes department
