= La Neuville =

La Neuville may refer to the following communes in France:

- La Neuville, Nord, in the Nord département
- La Neuville-à-Maire, in the Ardennes département
- La Neuville-au-Pont, in the Marne département
- La Neuville-aux-Bois, in the Marne département
- La Neuville-aux-Joûtes, in the Ardennes département
- La Neuville-aux-Larris, in the Marne département
- La Neuville-Bosmont, in the Aisne département
- La Neuville-Chant-d'Oisel, in the Seine-Maritime département
- La Neuville-d'Aumont, in the Oise département
- La Neuville-du-Bosc, in the Eure département
- La Neuville-en-Beine, in the Aisne département
- La Neuville-en-Hez, in the Oise département
- La Neuville-en-Tourne-à-Fuy, in the Ardennes département
- La Neuville-Garnier, in the Oise département
- La Neuville-Housset, in the Aisne département
- La Neuville-lès-Bray, in the Somme département
- La Neuville-lès-Dorengt, in the Aisne département
- La Neuville-lès-Wasigny, in the Ardennes département
- La Neuville-Saint-Pierre, in the Oise département
- La Neuville-Sire-Bernard, in the Somme département
- La Neuville-sur-Essonne, in the Loiret département
- La Neuville-sur-Oudeuil, in the Oise] département
- La Neuville-sur-Ressons, in the Oise département
- La Neuville-Vault, in the Oise département

== See also ==
- Neuville (disambiguation)
- Laneuville (disambiguation)
