= Brognon =

Brognon may refer to the following places in France:

- Brognon, Ardennes, a commune in the department of Ardennes
- Brognon, Côte-d'Or, a commune in the department of Côte-d'Or
