= Tremblois-lès-Rocroi =

- Commune
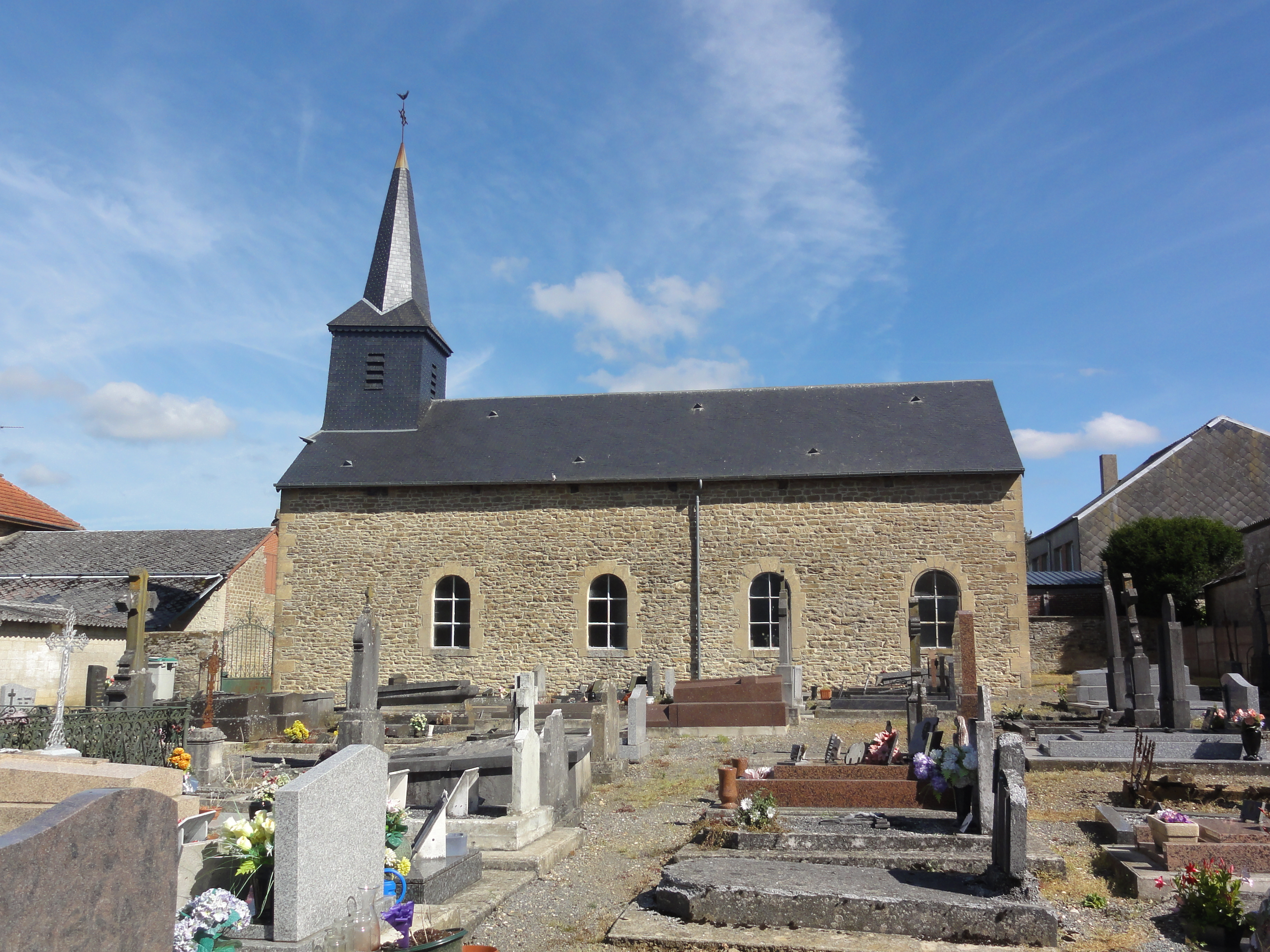
- The church in Tremblois-lès-Rocroi

- Coat of arms
- Location of Tremblois-lès-Rocroi
- Location within France Location within Grand Est
- Coordinates: 49°50′56″N 4°29′48″E
- Country: France
- Region: Grand Est
- Department: Ardennes
- Arrondissement: Charleville-Mézières
- Canton: Rocroi
- Intercommunality: Vallées et Plateau d'Ardenne

Government
  - Mayor (2020–2026): Fabrice Maurice
- Area^{1}: 1.64 km^{2} (0.63 sq mi)
- Elevation: 288 m (945 ft)
- Population (2023): 158
  - Density: 96.3/km^{2} (250/sq mi)
- Time zone: UTC+01:00 (CET)
  - Summer (DST): UTC+02:00 (CEST)
- INSEE/Postal code: 08460 /08150
- ^{1} French Land Register data, which excludes lakes, ponds, glaciers > 1 km^{2} (0.386 sq mi or 247 acres) and river estuaries.

Tremblois-lès-Rocroi (French pronunciation: [tʁɑ̃blwa lɛ ʁɔkʁwa], lit. 'Tremblois near Rocroi') is a commune in the Ardennes department and Grand Est region of north-eastern France.

== Population ==
Historical population
Year	Pop.	±% p.a.
1968	153	—
1975	153	+0.00%
1982	198	+3.75%
1990	168	−2.03%
1999	167	−0.07%
2007	158	−0.69%
2012	171	+1.59%
2017	156	−1.82%
2023	158	+0.21%
Source: INSEE

== See also ==
- Communes of the Ardennes department
