= Harcy =

- Commune
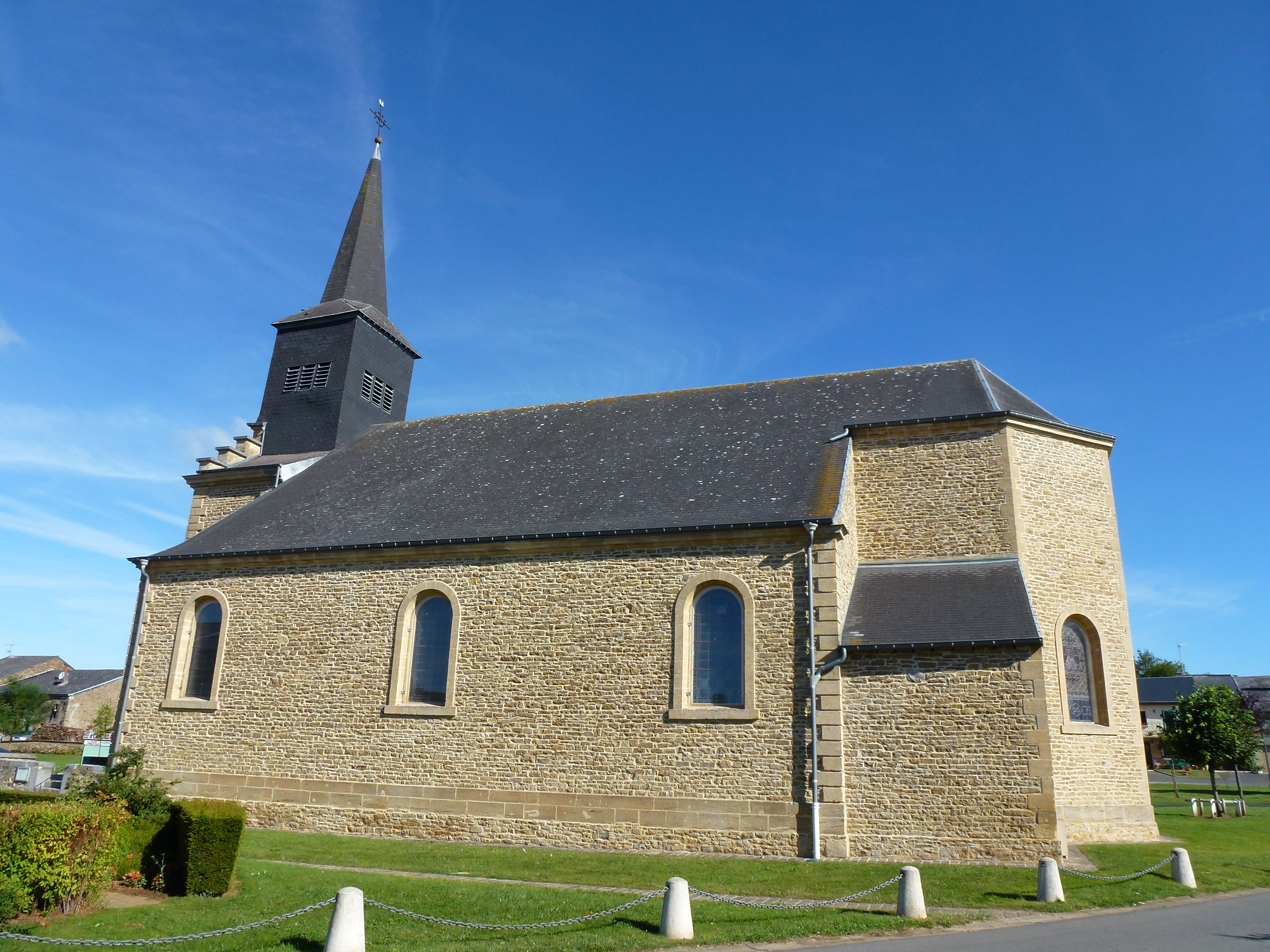
- The church in Harcy

- Coat of arms
- Location of Harcy
- Location within France Location within Grand Est
- Coordinates: 49°50′12″N 4°33′51″E
- Country: France
- Region: Grand Est
- Department: Ardennes
- Arrondissement: Charleville-Mézières
- Canton: Rocroi

Government
  - Mayor (2020–2026): Joël Richard
- Area^{1}: 19.15 km^{2} (7.39 sq mi)
- Elevation: 270 m (890 ft)
- Highest elevation: 370 m (1,210 ft)
- Lowest elevation: 200 m (660 ft)
- Population (2023): 515
  - Density: 26.9/km^{2} (69.7/sq mi)
- Time zone: UTC+01:00 (CET)
  - Summer (DST): UTC+02:00 (CEST)
- INSEE/Postal code: 08212 /08150
- ^{1} French Land Register data, which excludes lakes, ponds, glaciers > 1 km^{2} (0.386 sq mi or 247 acres) and river estuaries.

Harcy (French pronunciation: [aʁsi]) is a commune in the Ardennes department in northern France.

== Population ==
Historical population
Year	Pop.	±% p.a.
1968	402	—
1975	403	+0.04%
1982	419	+0.56%
1990	447	+0.81%
1999	459	+0.29%
2007	500	+1.08%
2012	493	−0.28%
2017	507	+0.56%
2023	515	+0.26%
Source: INSEE

== See also ==
- Communes of the Ardennes department
