= Fligny =

- Commune
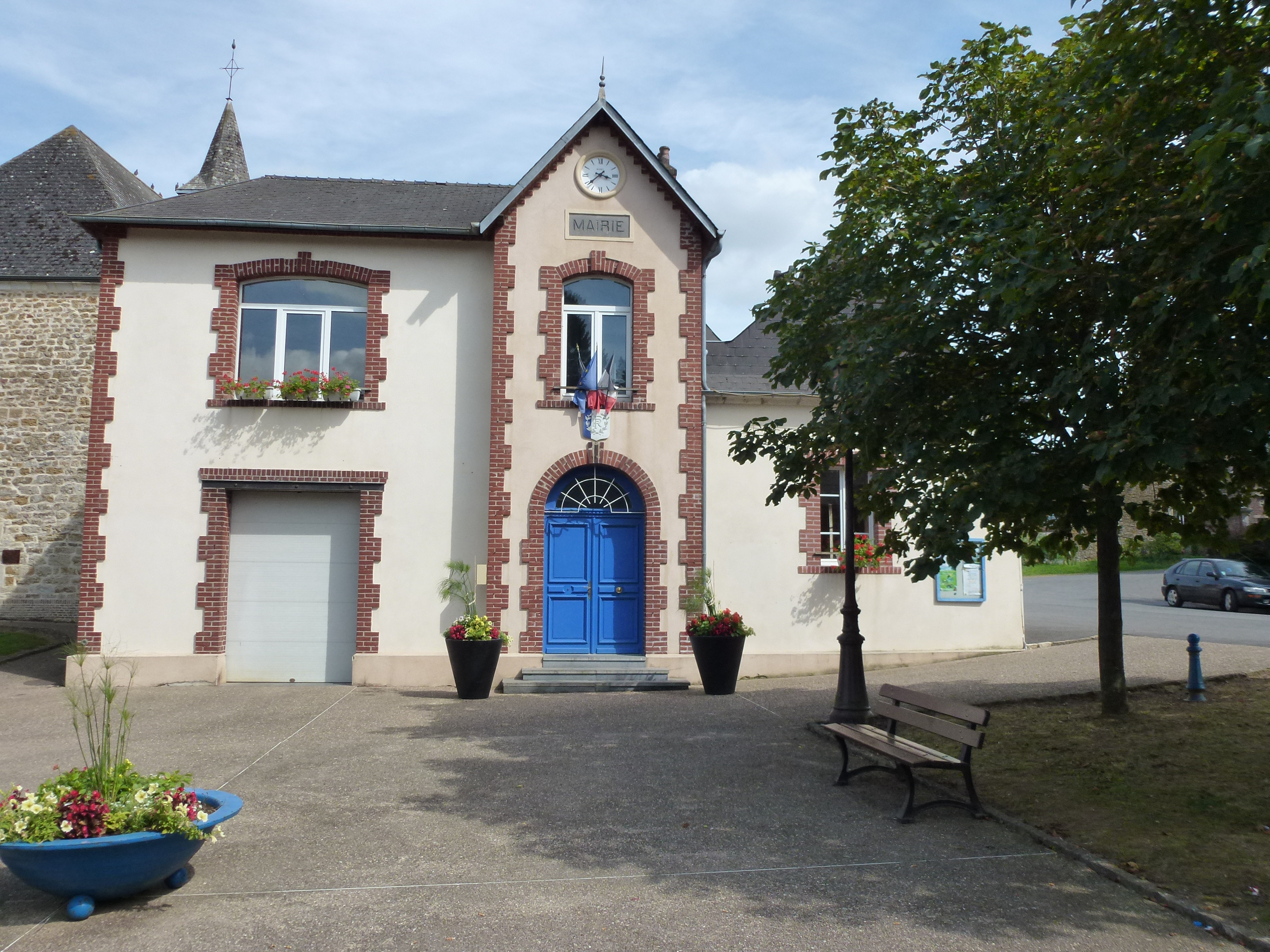
- Town hall
- Location of Fligny
- Location within France Location within Grand Est
- Coordinates: 49°52′57″N 4°15′57″E
- Country: France
- Region: Grand Est
- Department: Ardennes
- Arrondissement: Charleville-Mézières
- Canton: Rocroi

Government
  - Mayor (2020–2026): Bernard Gosset
- Area^{1}: 6.85 km^{2} (2.64 sq mi)
- Elevation: 220 m (720 ft)
- Population (2023): 154
  - Density: 22.5/km^{2} (58.2/sq mi)
- Time zone: UTC+01:00 (CET)
  - Summer (DST): UTC+02:00 (CEST)
- INSEE/Postal code: 08172 /08380
- ^{1} French Land Register data, which excludes lakes, ponds, glaciers > 1 km^{2} (0.386 sq mi or 247 acres) and river estuaries.

Fligny (French pronunciation: [fliɲi]) is a commune in the Ardennes department in northern France.

== Population ==
Historical population
Year	Pop.	±% p.a.
1968	189	—
1975	173	−1.26%
1982	189	+1.27%
1990	173	−1.10%
1999	176	+0.19%
2007	184	+0.56%
2012	187	+0.32%
2017	185	−0.21%
2023	154	−3.01%
Source: INSEE

== See also ==
- Communes of the Ardennes department
