= Laneuville =

== Places ==
Laneuville may refer to the following places in France:

- Laneuville-au-Pont, in the Haute-Marne département
- Laneuville-au-Rupt, in the Meuse département
- Laneuville-sur-Meuse, in the Meuse département

== People ==
Laneuville may refer to the following person:

- Eric Laneuville (1952-), an American television director, producer and actor
- Jean-Louis Laneuville (1748–1826), a French portrait painter

== See also ==
- Neuville (disambiguation)
- La Neuville (disambiguation)
