= Signy-le-Petit =

- Commune
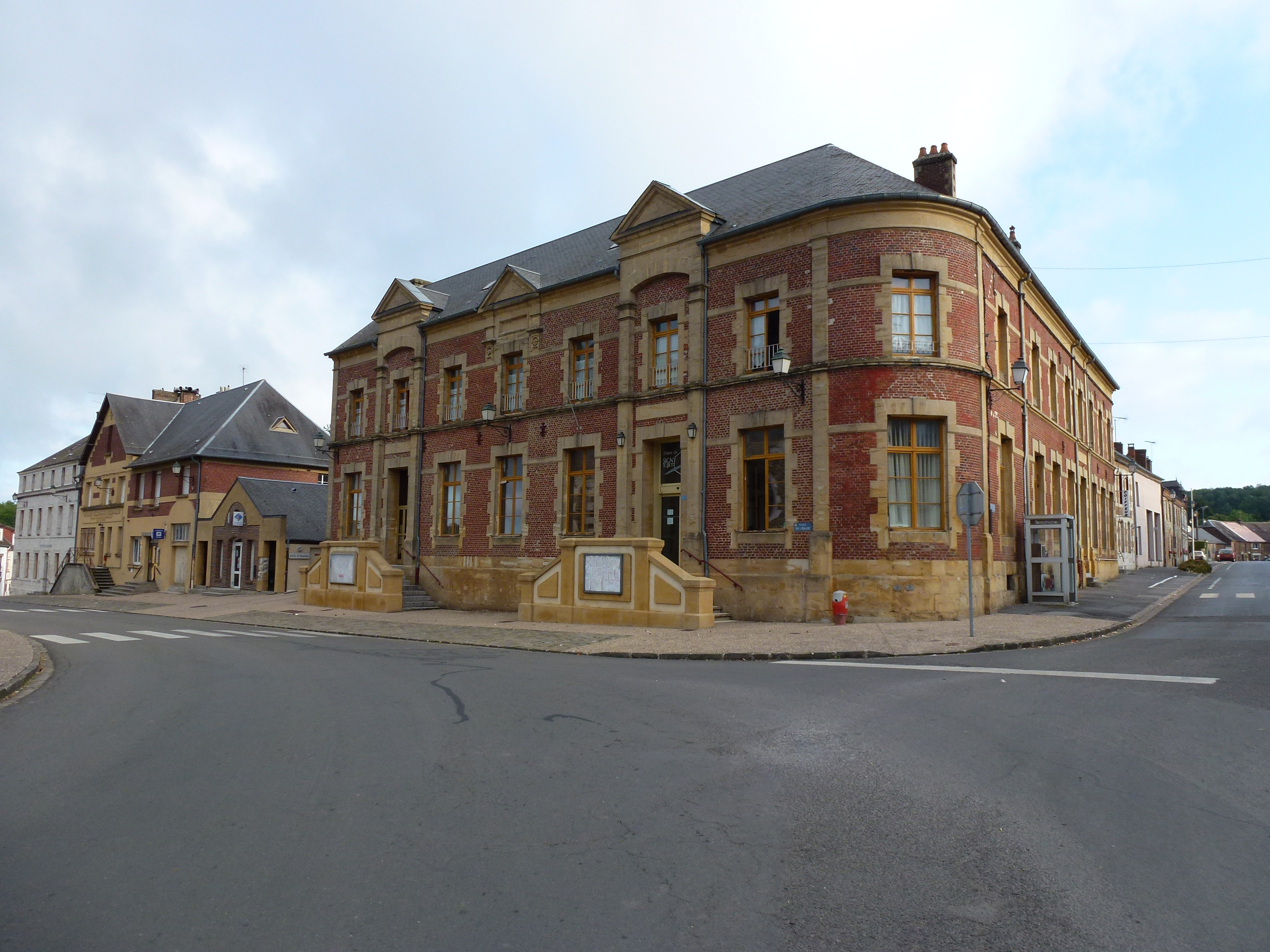
- The town hall in Signy-le-Petit

- Coat of arms
- Location of Signy-le-Petit
- Location within France Location within Grand Est
- Coordinates: 49°54′16″N 4°16′50″E
- Country: France
- Region: Grand Est
- Department: Ardennes
- Arrondissement: Charleville-Mézières
- Canton: Rocroi

Government
  - Mayor (2020–2026): Béatrice Cardon
- Area^{1}: 38.72 km^{2} (14.95 sq mi)
- Elevation: 232 m (761 ft)
- Population (2023): 1,213
  - Density: 31.33/km^{2} (81.14/sq mi)
- Time zone: UTC+01:00 (CET)
  - Summer (DST): UTC+02:00 (CEST)
- INSEE/Postal code: 08420 /08380
- ^{1} French Land Register data, which excludes lakes, ponds, glaciers > 1 km^{2} (0.386 sq mi or 247 acres) and river estuaries.

Signy-le-Petit (French pronunciation: [siɲi lə pəti]) is a commune in the Ardennes department in northern France.

== Population ==
Historical population
| Year | Pop. | ±% p.a. |
|---|---|---|
| 1968 | 1,592 | — |
| 1975 | 1,543 | −0.45% |
| 1982 | 1,361 | −1.78% |
| 1990 | 1,280 | −0.76% |
| 1999 | 1,314 | +0.29% |
| 2007 | 1,292 | −0.21% |
| 2012 | 1,293 | +0.02% |
| 2017 | 1,243 | −0.79% |
| 2023 | 1,213 | −0.41% |
Source: INSEE

== See also ==
- Communes of the Ardennes department
