= Gué-d'Hossus =

- Commune
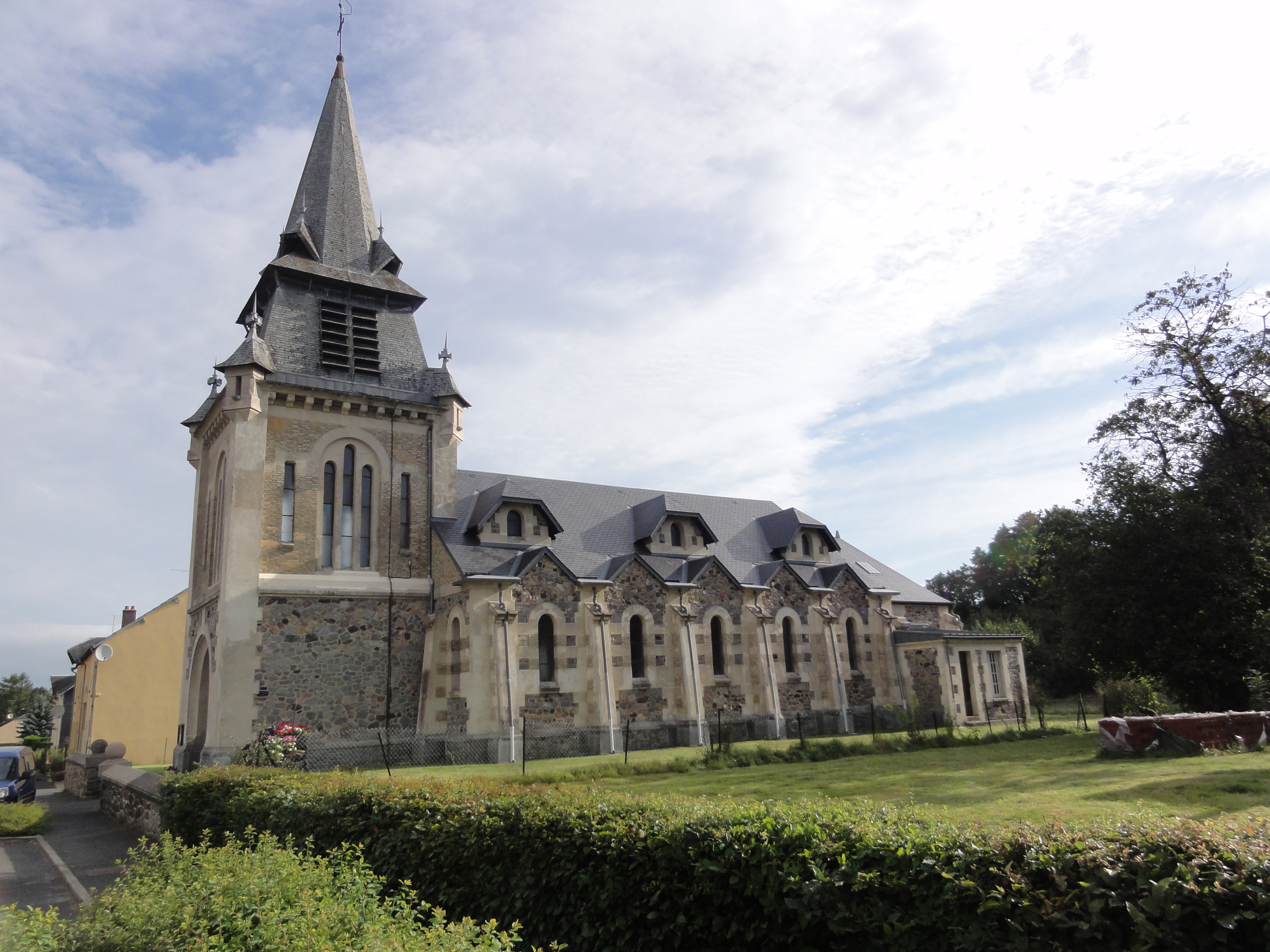
- The church in Gué-d'Hossus

- Coat of arms
- Location of Gué-d'Hossus
- Location within France Location within Grand Est
- Coordinates: 49°57′26″N 4°32′04″E
- Country: France
- Region: Grand Est
- Department: Ardennes
- Arrondissement: Charleville-Mézières
- Canton: Rocroi

Government
  - Mayor (2020–2026): André Liebeaux
- Area^{1}: 5.23 km^{2} (2.02 sq mi)
- Elevation: 325 m (1,066 ft)
- Population (2023): 504
  - Density: 96.4/km^{2} (250/sq mi)
- Time zone: UTC+01:00 (CET)
  - Summer (DST): UTC+02:00 (CEST)
- INSEE/Postal code: 08202 /08230
- ^{1} French Land Register data, which excludes lakes, ponds, glaciers > 1 km^{2} (0.386 sq mi or 247 acres) and river estuaries.

Gué-d'Hossus (French pronunciation: [ɡe dɔsy]) is a commune in the Ardennes department in northern France.

== Population ==
Historical population
Year	Pop.	±% p.a.
1968	543	—
1975	452	−2.59%
1982	500	+1.45%
1990	525	+0.61%
1999	504	−0.45%
2007	504	+0.00%
2012	530	+1.01%
2017	526	−0.15%
2023	504	−0.71%
Source: INSEE

== See also ==
- Communes of the Ardennes department
