= Sévigny-la-Forêt =

- Commune
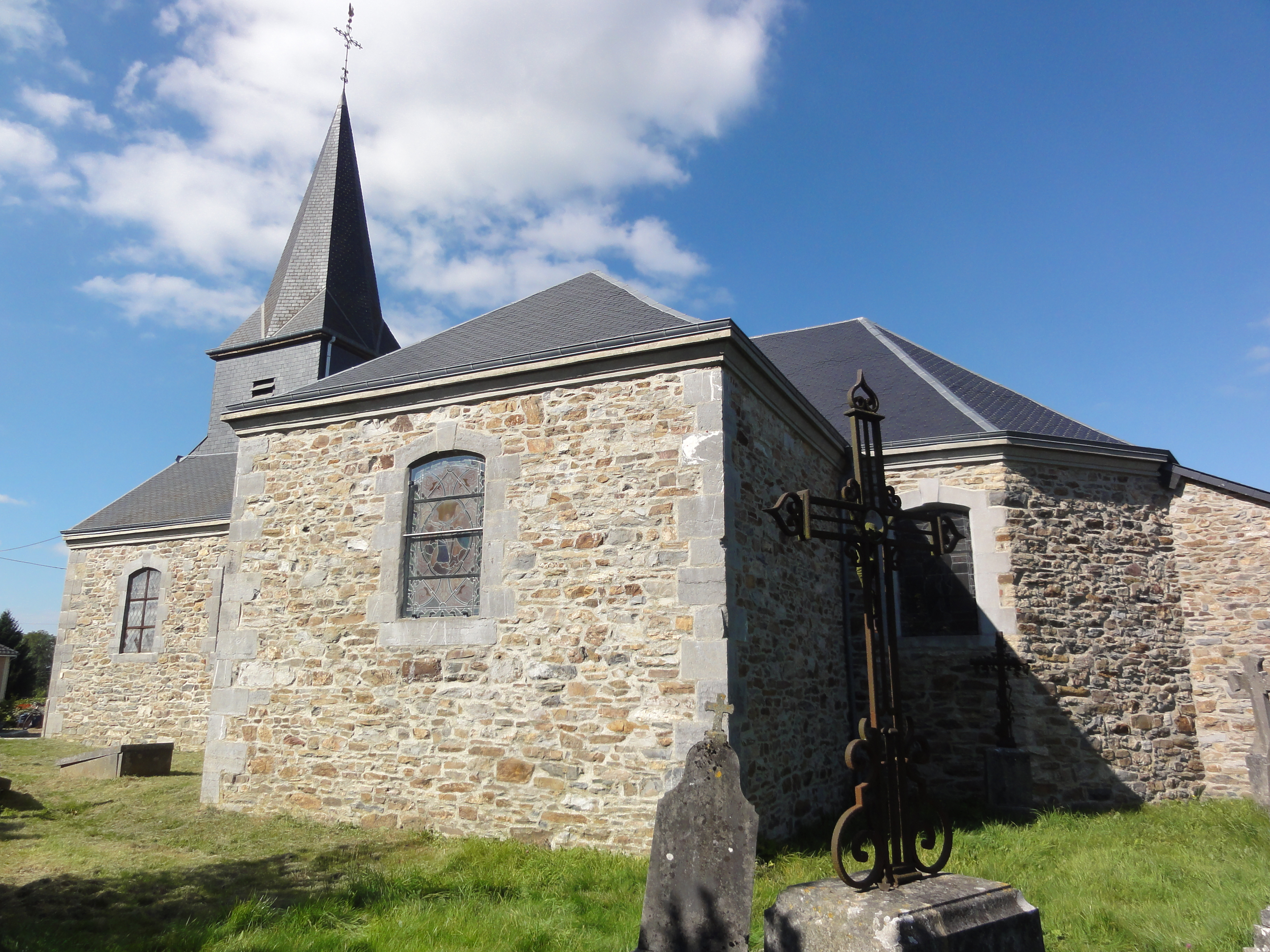
- The church in Sévigny-la-Forêt

- Coat of arms
- Location of Sévigny-la-Forêt
- Location within France Location within Grand Est
- Coordinates: 49°53′15″N 4°29′39″E
- Country: France
- Region: Grand Est
- Department: Ardennes
- Arrondissement: Charleville-Mézières
- Canton: Rocroi

Government
  - Mayor (2020–2026): Maryse Coucke
- Area^{1}: 26.13 km^{2} (10.09 sq mi)
- Elevation: 375 m (1,230 ft)
- Population (2023): 270
  - Density: 10/km^{2} (27/sq mi)
- Time zone: UTC+01:00 (CET)
  - Summer (DST): UTC+02:00 (CEST)
- INSEE/Postal code: 08417 /08230
- ^{1} French Land Register data, which excludes lakes, ponds, glaciers > 1 km^{2} (0.386 sq mi or 247 acres) and river estuaries.

Sévigny-la-Forêt (French pronunciation: [seviɲi la fɔʁɛ]) is a commune in the Ardennes department in northern France.

== Population ==
Historical population
Year	Pop.	±% p.a.
1968	176	—
1975	139	−3.32%
1982	147	+0.80%
1990	191	+3.33%
1999	200	+0.51%
2007	233	+1.93%
2012	262	+2.37%
2017	276	+1.05%
2023	270	−0.37%
Source: INSEE

== See also ==
- Communes of the Ardennes department
