= Auge, Ardennes =

Auge
- Commune
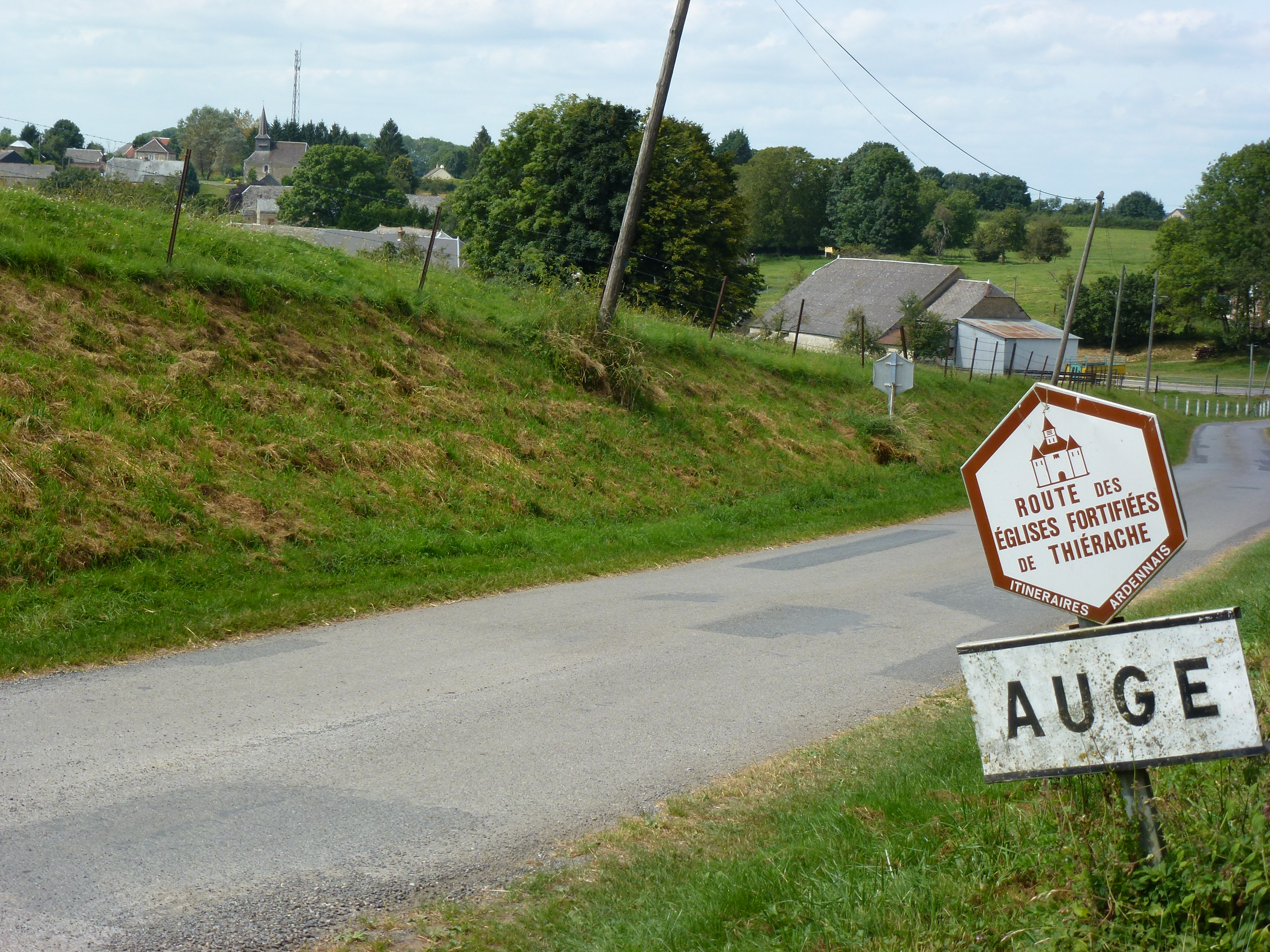
- Entry to the village

- Coat of arms
- Location of Auge
- Location within France Location within Grand Est
- Coordinates: 49°51′41″N 4°16′15″E
- Country: France
- Region: Grand Est
- Department: Ardennes
- Arrondissement: Charleville-Mézières
- Canton: Rocroi
- Intercommunality: CC Ardennes Thiérache

Government
  - Mayor (2020–2026): Jean-Yves Chevanne
- Area^{1}: 4.5 km^{2} (1.7 sq mi)
- Elevation: 250 m (820 ft)
- Highest elevation: 262 m (860 ft)
- Lowest elevation: 199 m (653 ft)
- Population (2023): 58
  - Density: 13/km^{2} (33/sq mi)
- Time zone: UTC+01:00 (CET)
  - Summer (DST): UTC+02:00 (CEST)
- INSEE/Postal code: 08030 /08380
- ^{1} French Land Register data, which excludes lakes, ponds, glaciers > 1 km^{2} (0.386 sq mi or 247 acres) and river estuaries.

Auge (French pronunciation: [oʒ]) is a commune in the Ardennes department in the Grand Est region of north-eastern France.

== Geography ==
Auge is located some 45 km west by north-west of Charleville-Mézières and 22 km east by south-east of Hirson. The western border of the commune is the border between the departments of Ardennes and Aisne. Access to the commune is by the European route E44 (D 8043) from Hirson which passes through the north of the commune and continues east to Maubert-Fontaine. Access to the village is by either the Grande Rue or by the Ruelle de l'Église which both branch south from the E44. Apart from a band of forest on the south-eastern border (The Bois de Moirvaux) and some patches of forest in the south-west the commune is entirely farmland.

== Toponymy ==
The name of the town was written Ogiae in 1112 in a privilege of Pope Paschal II to the Abbey of Saint-Nicaise in Reims and as Oggeium in a bull of Innocent II for the same monastery at Reims.

== History ==
This site has been on an ancient road between Mézières and the North since Classical Antiquity. Gallo-Roman foundations, coins, and pieces of pottery have been found.

=== Heraldry ===
Arms of Auge	Blazon: Party per bend sinister, at 1 Azure, three mullets of Or in orle; at 2 Gules, a cock of Or.

== Administration ==
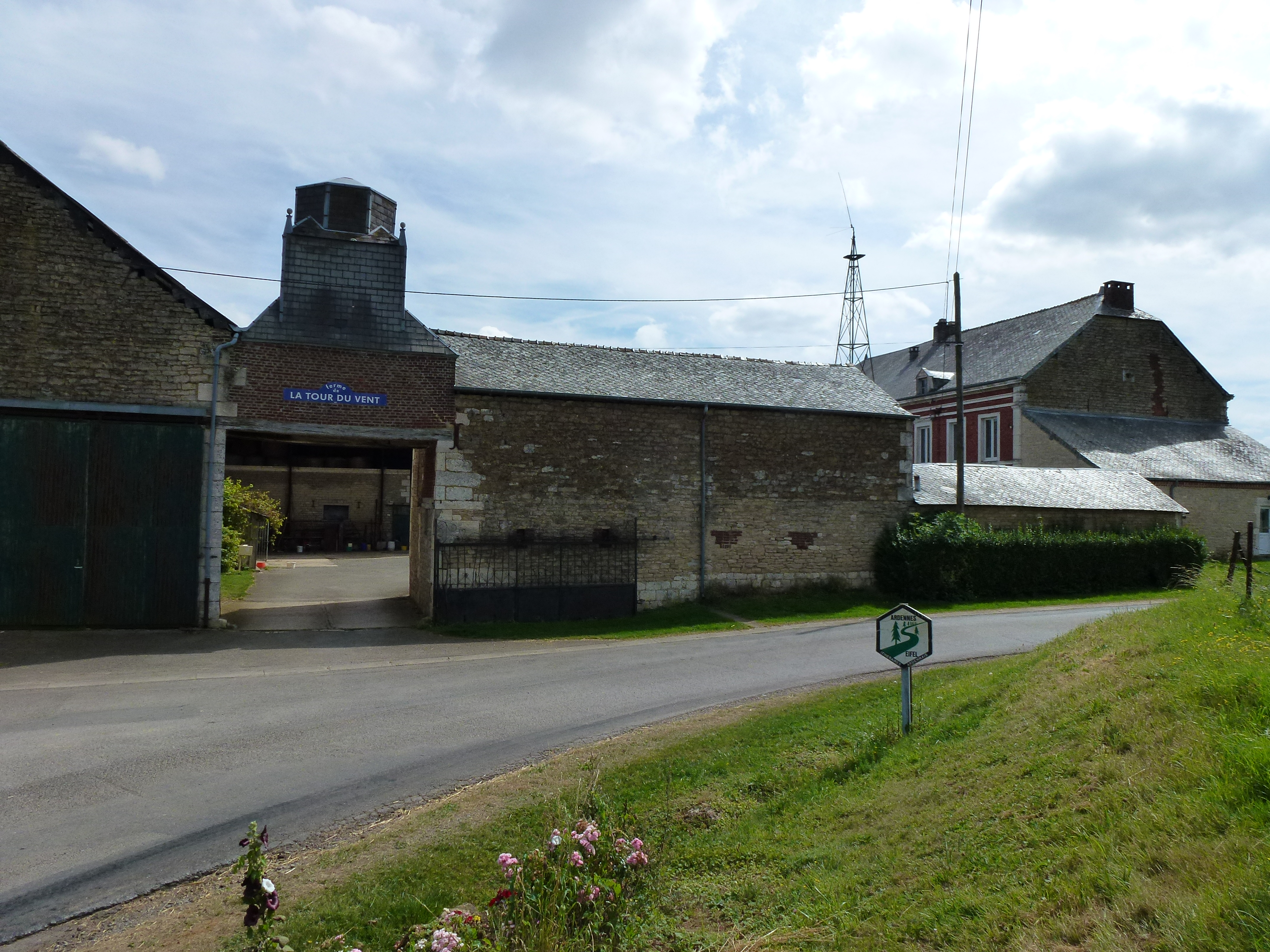
La tour du vent Farm

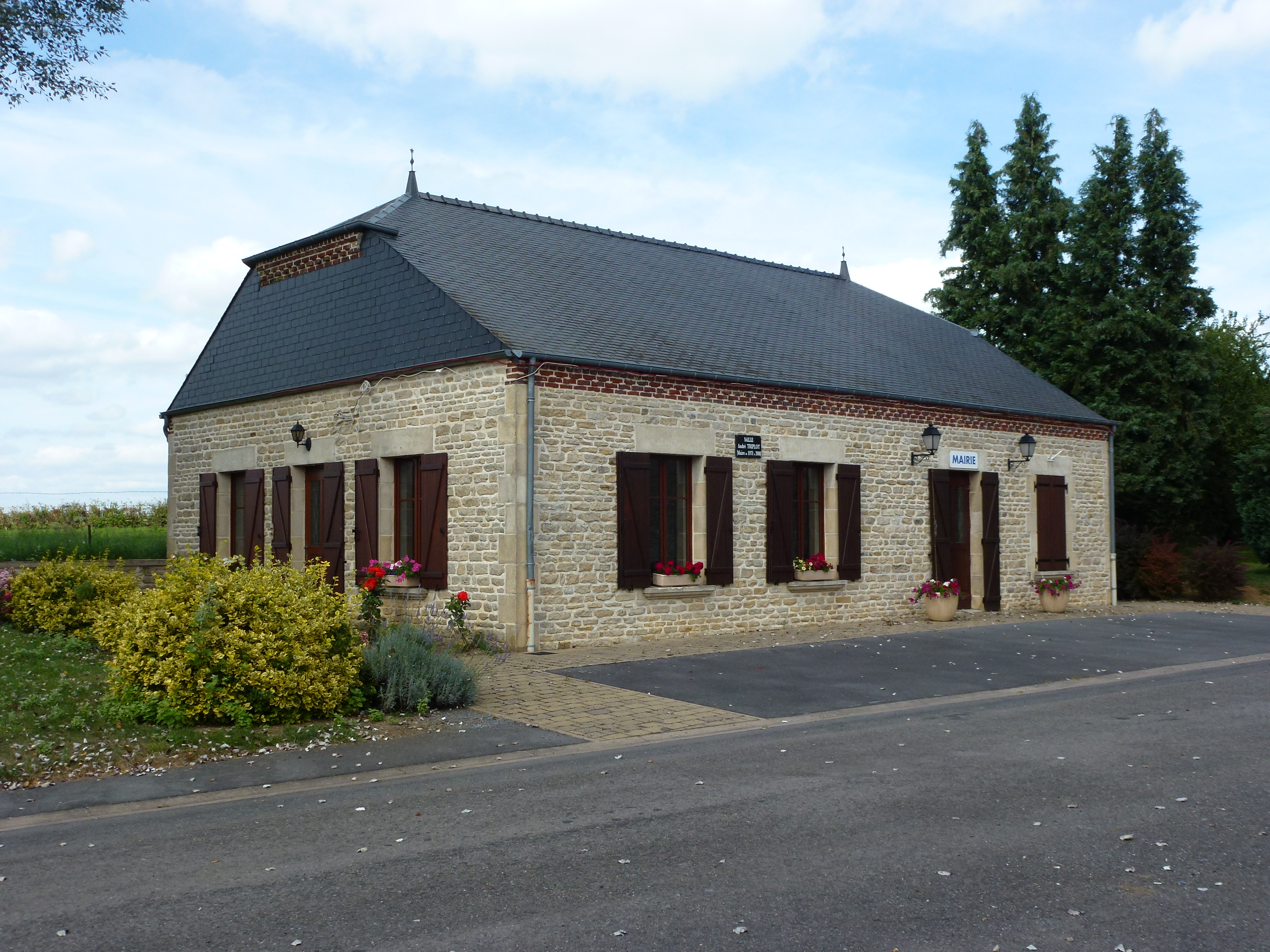
The Town Hall

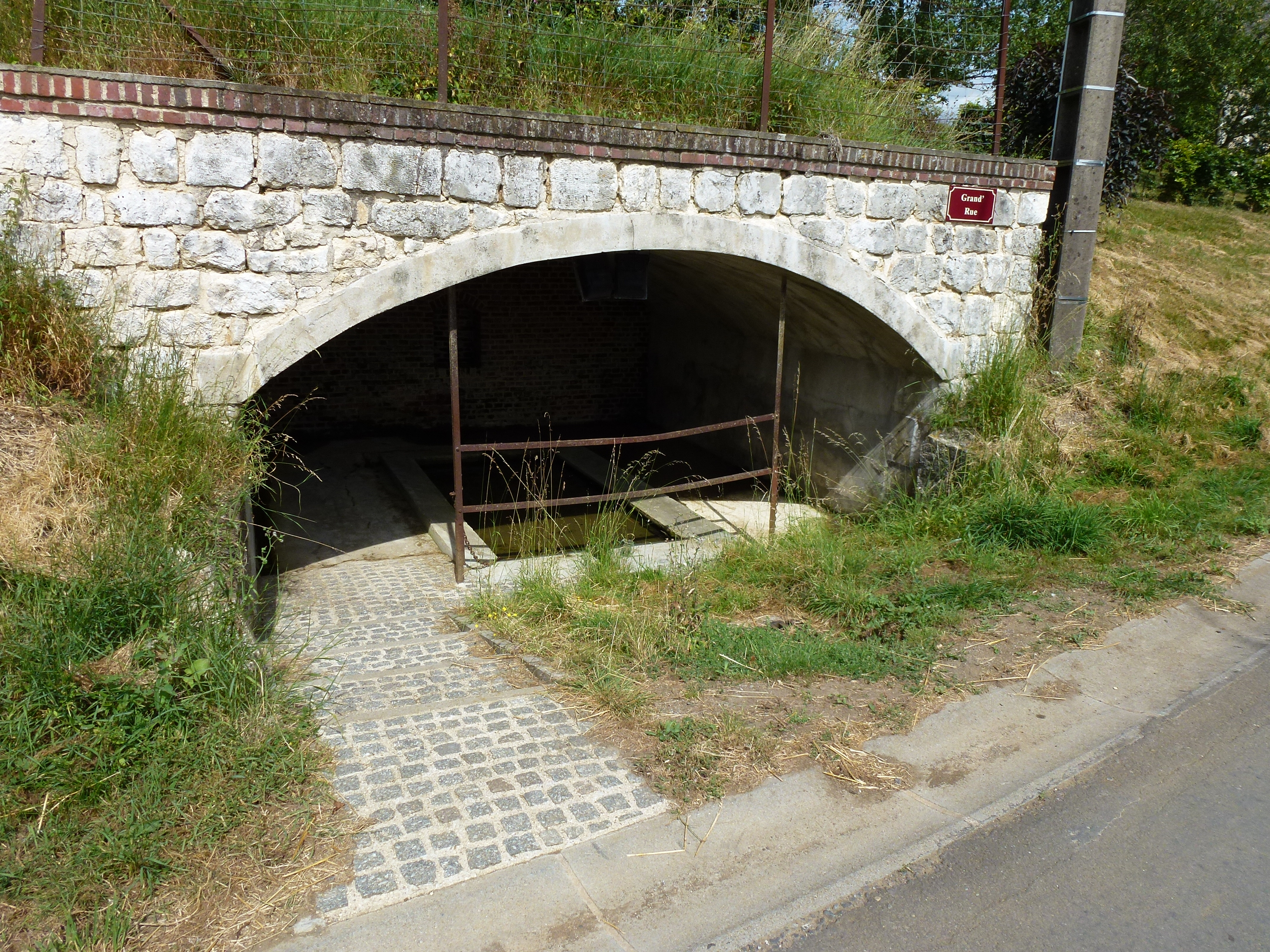
The Lavoir (Public laundry)

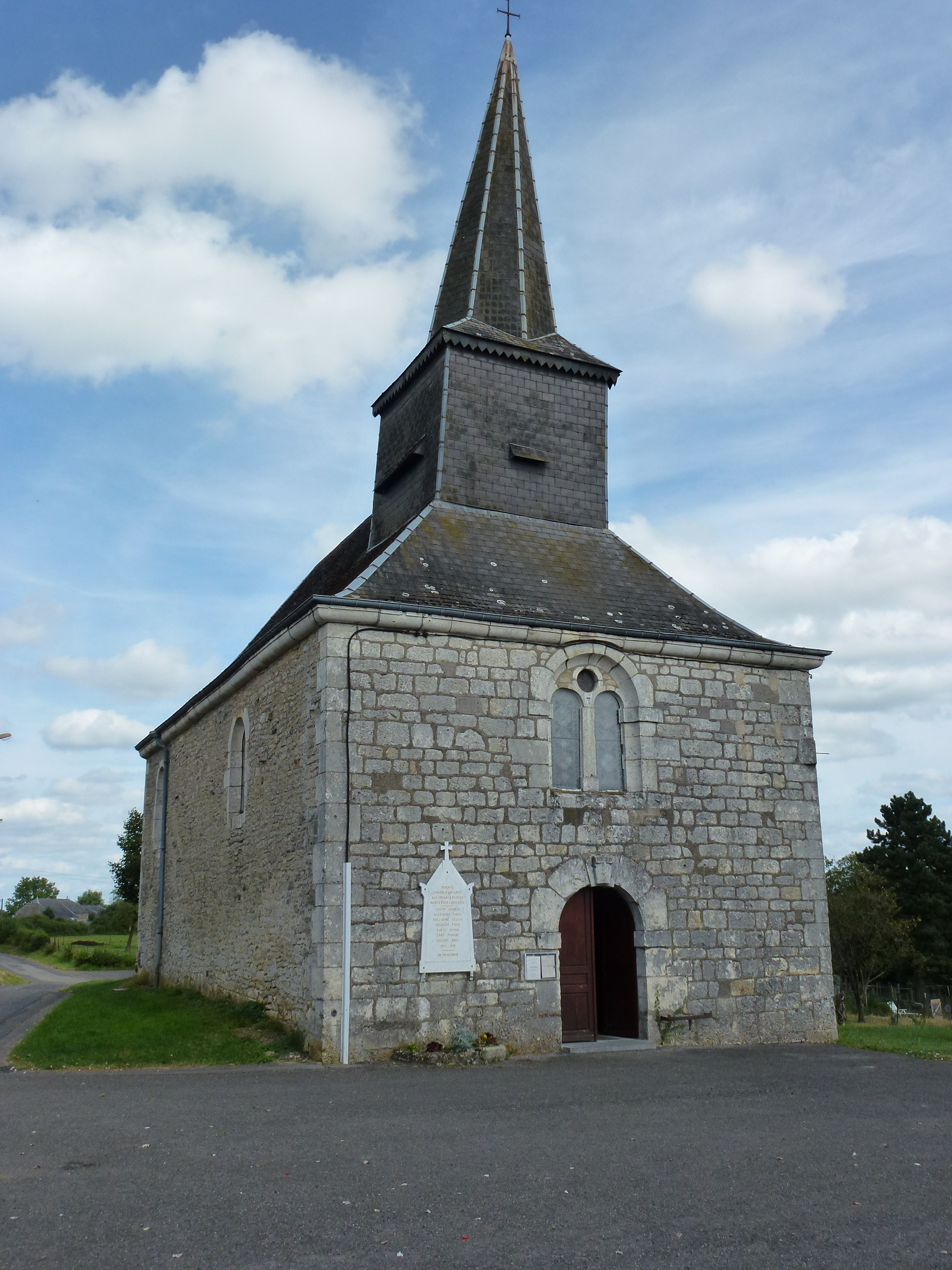
the Church of Saint-Gorgery

List of Successive Mayors

From	To	Name
2001	2008	André Triplot
2008	current	Jean-Yves Chevanne

== Demography ==
Historical population

Year	Pop.	±% p.a.
1793	148	—
1821	145	−0.07%
1846	183	+0.94%
1872	175	−0.17%
1901	148	−0.58%
1921	126	−0.80%
1946	112	−0.47%
1962	95	−1.02%
1968	82	−2.42%

Year	Pop.	±% p.a.
1975	72	−1.84%
1982	66	−1.24%
1990	69	+0.56%
1999	69	+0.00%
2007	60	−1.73%
2012	53	−2.45%
2017	60	+2.51%
2023	58	−0.56%

Source: EHESS and INSEE

== Sites and monuments ==
The Tombstone of Jacques de Corderand, his wife, and his son (18th century) in the Church of Saint-Gorgery is registered as an historical object.

== Notable people linked to the commune ==
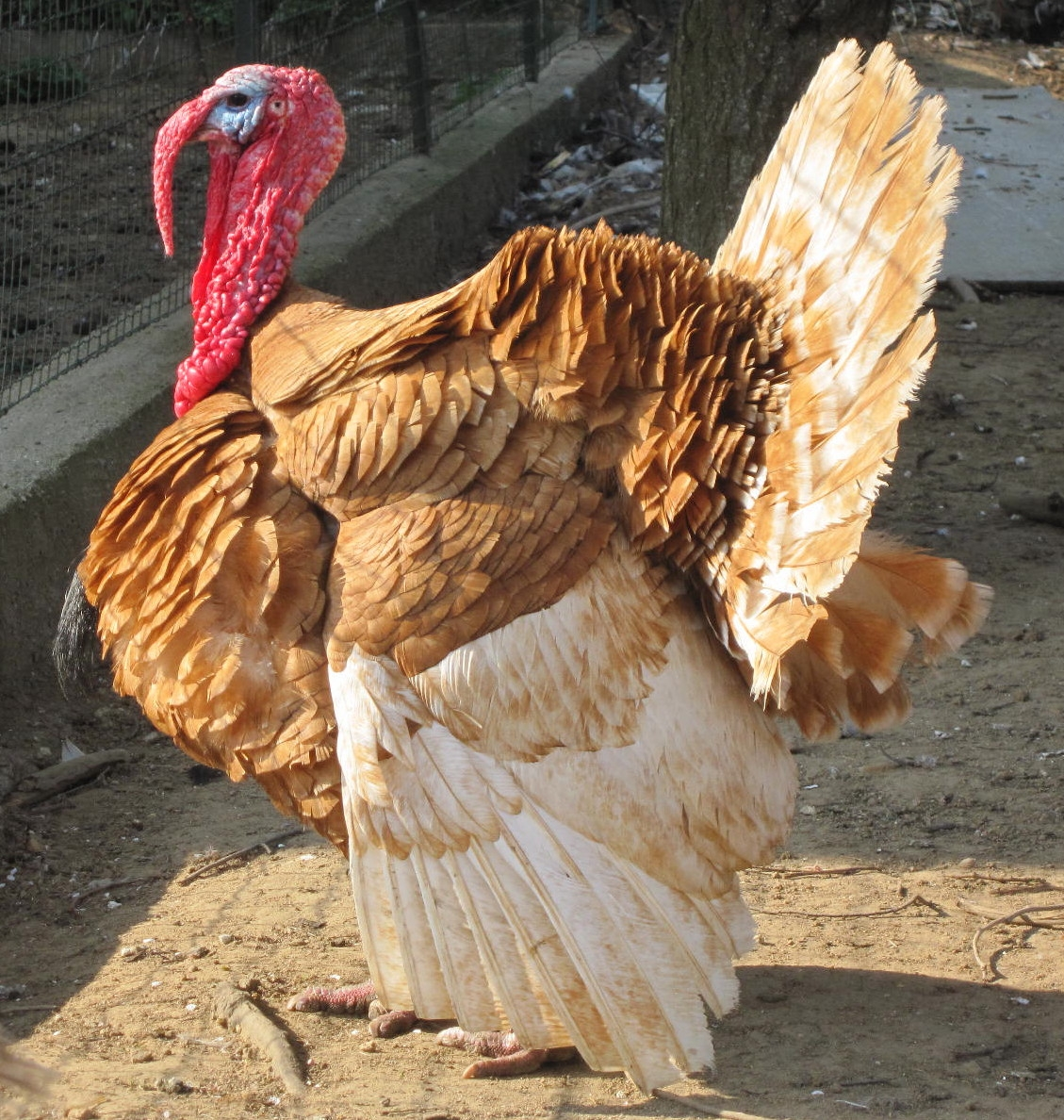
Ardennes Red Turkey

- Jean-Michel Devresse, a farmer at Auge, relaunched livestock farming of Ardennes Red Turkeys (Dindon rouge des Ardennes) in 1985, so that this species would not disappear.

== See also ==
- Communes of the Ardennes department
