= Saint-Marcel, Ardennes =

Saint-Marcel
- Commune
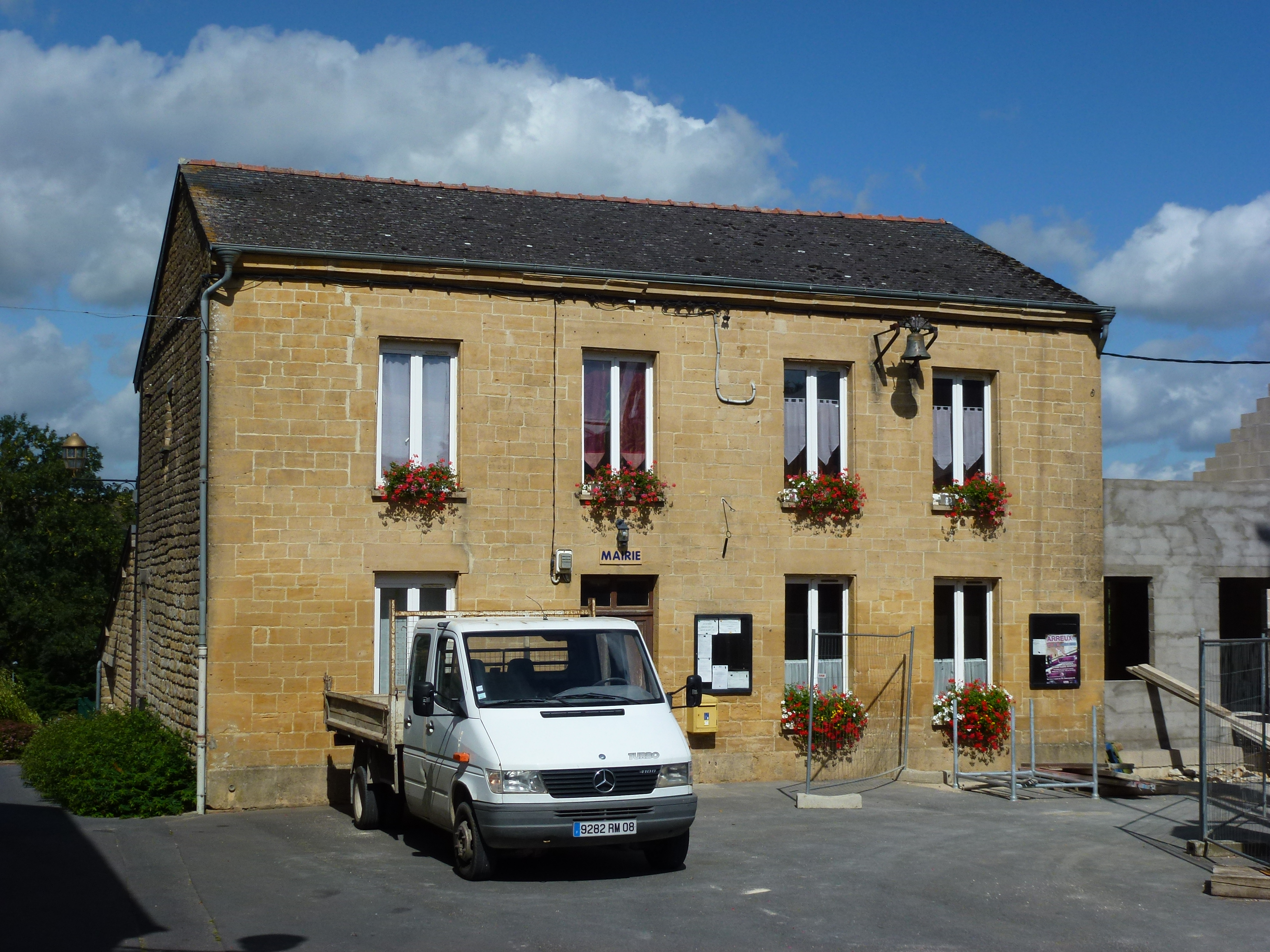
- The town hall in Saint-Marcel
- Location of Saint-Marcel
- Location within France Location within Grand Est
- Coordinates: 49°45′49″N 4°34′27″E
- Country: France
- Region: Grand Est
- Department: Ardennes
- Arrondissement: Charleville-Mézières
- Canton: Rocroi

Government
  - Mayor (2020–2026): Daniel Thiébaux
- Area^{1}: 10.84 km^{2} (4.19 sq mi)
- Elevation: 181 m (594 ft)
- Highest elevation: 296 m (971 ft)
- Lowest elevation: 153 m (502 ft)
- Population (2023): 325
  - Density: 30.0/km^{2} (77.7/sq mi)
- Time zone: UTC+01:00 (CET)
  - Summer (DST): UTC+02:00 (CEST)
- INSEE/Postal code: 08389 /08460
- ^{1} French Land Register data, which excludes lakes, ponds, glaciers > 1 km^{2} (0.386 sq mi or 247 acres) and river estuaries.

Saint-Marcel (French pronunciation: [sɛ̃ maʁsɛl]) is a commune in the Ardennes department and Grand Est region of north-eastern France.

== Population ==
Historical population
Year	Pop.	±% p.a.
1968	194	—
1975	180	−1.06%
1982	265	+5.68%
1990	309	+1.94%
1999	325	+0.56%
2007	330	+0.19%
2012	355	+1.47%
2017	358	+0.17%
2023	325	−1.60%
Source: INSEE

== See also ==
- Communes of the Ardennes department
