= This, Ardennes =

This
- Commune
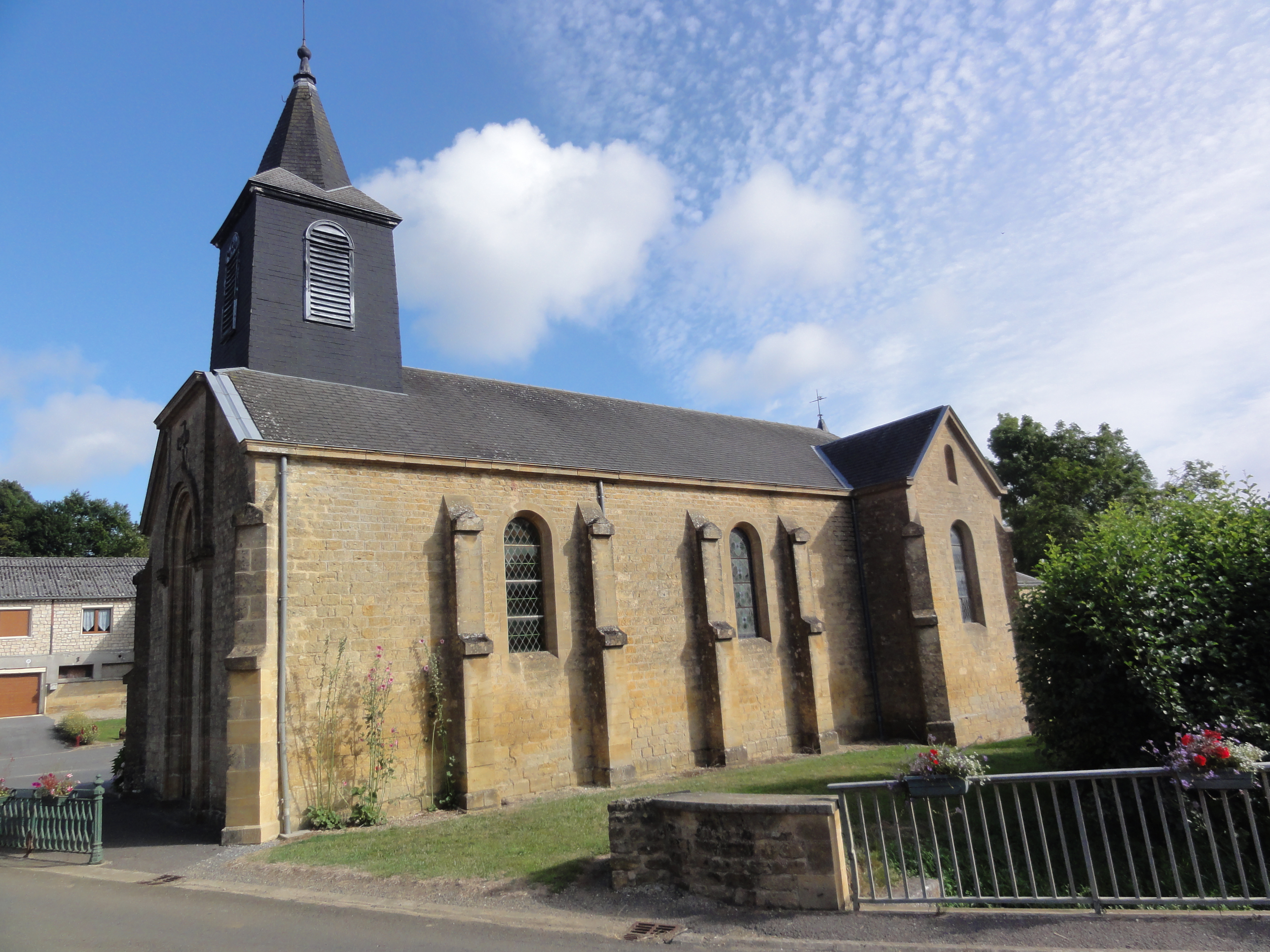
- The church in This

- Coat of arms
- Location of This
- Location within France Location within Grand Est
- Coordinates: 49°45′00″N 4°36′34″E
- Country: France
- Region: Grand Est
- Department: Ardennes
- Arrondissement: Charleville-Mézières
- Canton: Rocroi
- Intercommunality: Vallées et Plateau d'Ardenne

Government
  - Mayor (2020–2026): Geoffrey Thevenin
- Area^{1}: 4.46 km^{2} (1.72 sq mi)
- Elevation: 168 m (551 ft)
- Population (2023): 224
  - Density: 50.2/km^{2} (130/sq mi)
- Time zone: UTC+01:00 (CET)
  - Summer (DST): UTC+02:00 (CEST)
- INSEE/Postal code: 08450 /08090
- ^{1} French Land Register data, which excludes lakes, ponds, glaciers > 1 km^{2} (0.386 sq mi or 247 acres) and river estuaries.

This is a commune in the Ardennes department of northern France.

== Population ==
Historical population
Year	Pop.	±% p.a.
1968	149	—
1975	147	−0.19%
1982	137	−1.00%
1990	160	+1.96%
1999	180	+1.32%
2007	196	+1.07%
2012	217	+2.06%
2017	227	+0.91%
2023	224	−0.22%
Source: INSEE

== See also ==
- Communes of the Ardennes department
