= Canton of Rocroi =

Coordinates: 49.92°N 4.52°E

- Canton
- Situation of the canton of Rocroi in the department of Ardennes
- Country: France
- Region: Grand Est
- Department: Ardennes
- No. of communes: {{{nbcomm}}}
- Population (2023): 15,043
- INSEE code: 0813

The canton of Rocroi is an administrative division of the Ardennes department, northern France. Its borders were modified at the French canton reorganisation which came into effect in March 2015. Its seat is in Rocroi.

It consists of the following communes:

1. Auge
2. Auvillers-les-Forges
3. Blombay
4. Bourg-Fidèle
5. Brognon
6. Le Châtelet-sur-Sormonne
7. Chilly
8. Étalle
9. Éteignières
10. Fligny
11. Gué-d'Hossus
12. Ham-les-Moines
13. Harcy
14. Laval-Morency
15. Lonny
16. Maubert-Fontaine
17. Murtin-et-Bogny
18. La Neuville-aux-Joûtes
19. Neuville-lez-Beaulieu
20. Neuville-lès-This
21. Regniowez
22. Remilly-les-Pothées
23. Rimogne
24. Rocroi
25. Saint-Marcel
26. Sévigny-la-Forêt
27. Signy-le-Petit
28. Sormonne
29. Sury
30. Taillette
31. Tarzy
32. This
33. Tremblois-lès-Rocroi
