= Sury =

- Commune
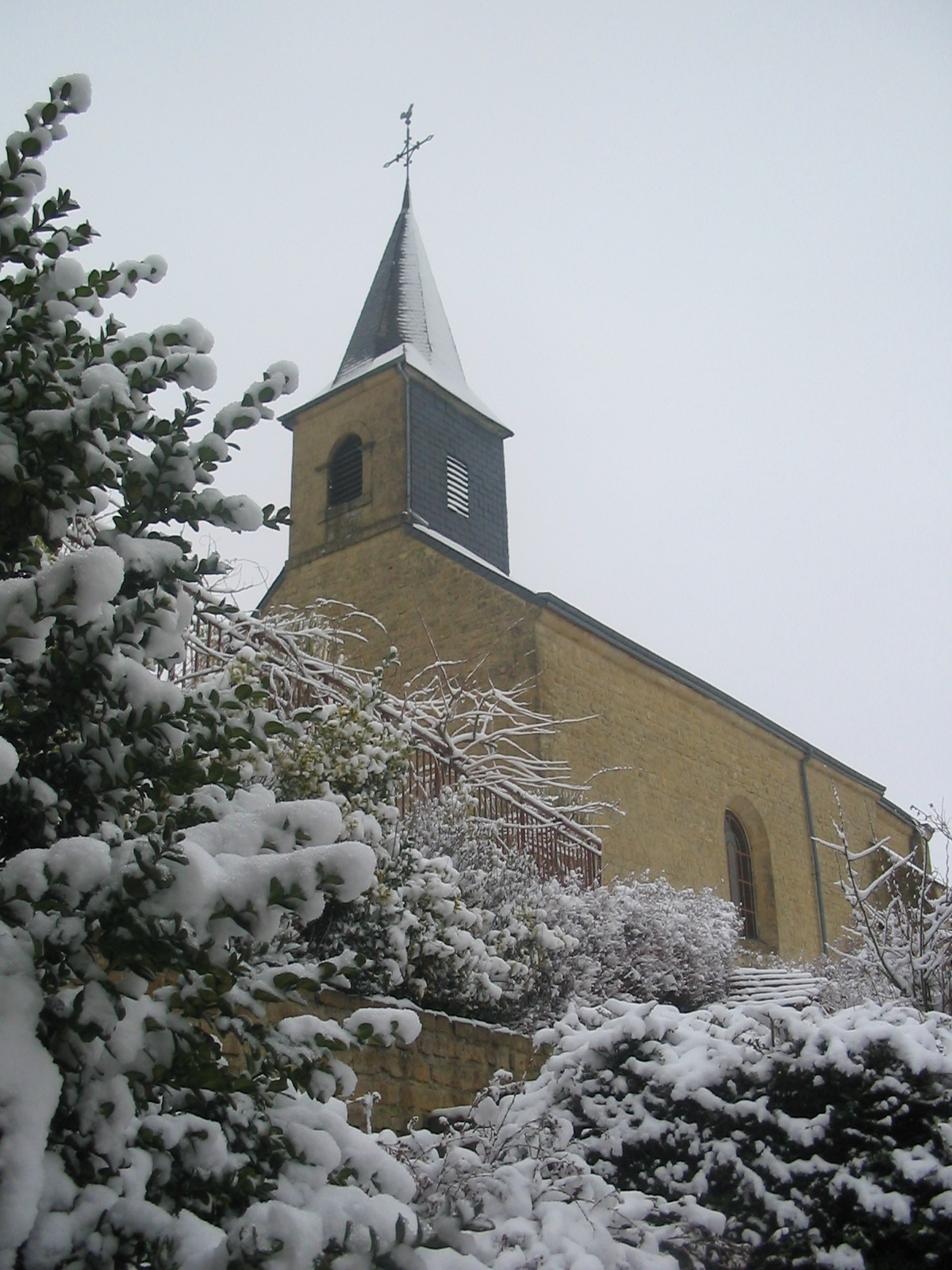
- The church in Sury
- Location of Sury
- Location within France Location within Grand Est
- Coordinates: 49°45′59″N 4°36′36″E
- Country: France
- Region: Grand Est
- Department: Ardennes
- Arrondissement: Charleville-Mézières
- Canton: Rocroi

Government
  - Mayor (2020–2026): Patrice Ramelet
- Area^{1}: 3.31 km^{2} (1.28 sq mi)
- Elevation: 205 m (673 ft)
- Highest elevation: 301 m (988 ft)
- Lowest elevation: 159 m (522 ft)
- Population (2023): 94
  - Density: 28/km^{2} (74/sq mi)
- Time zone: UTC+01:00 (CET)
  - Summer (DST): UTC+02:00 (CEST)
- INSEE/Postal code: 08432 /08090
- ^{1} French Land Register data, which excludes lakes, ponds, glaciers > 1 km^{2} (0.386 sq mi or 247 acres) and river estuaries.

Sury (French pronunciation: [syʁi]) is a commune in the Ardennes department in northern France.

== Population ==
Historical population
Year	Pop.	±% p.a.
1968	59	—
1975	64	+1.17%
1982	123	+9.78%
1990	130	+0.69%
1999	114	−1.45%
2007	100	−1.62%
2012	97	−0.61%
2017	108	+2.17%
2023	94	−2.29%
Source: INSEE

== See also ==
- Communes of the Ardennes department
