= La Neuville-aux-Joûtes =

- Commune
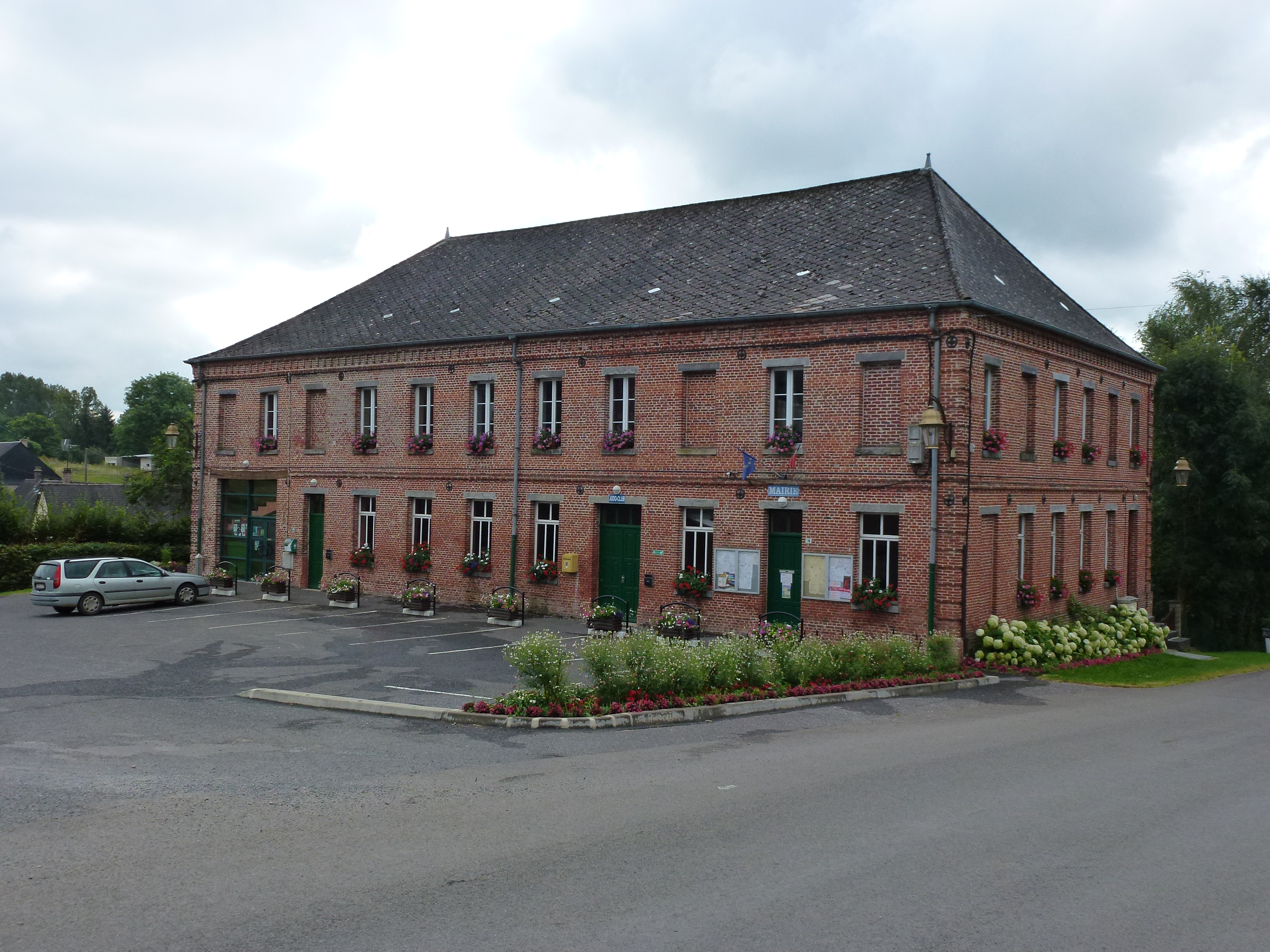
- Town hall

- Coat of arms
- Location of La Neuville-aux-Joûtes
- Location within France Location within Grand Est
- Coordinates: 49°55′19″N 4°13′50″E
- Country: France
- Region: Grand Est
- Department: Ardennes
- Arrondissement: Charleville-Mézières
- Canton: Rocroi

Government
  - Mayor (2020–2026): Roseline Delsaux
- Area^{1}: 13.17 km^{2} (5.08 sq mi)
- Elevation: 250 m (820 ft)
- Population (2023): 354
  - Density: 26.9/km^{2} (69.6/sq mi)
- Time zone: UTC+01:00 (CET)
  - Summer (DST): UTC+02:00 (CEST)
- INSEE/Postal code: 08318 /08380
- ^{1} French Land Register data, which excludes lakes, ponds, glaciers > 1 km^{2} (0.386 sq mi or 247 acres) and river estuaries.

La Neuville-aux-Joûtes (French pronunciation: [la nøvil o ʒut]) is a commune in the Ardennes department in northern France.

== Population ==
Historical population
Year	Pop.	±% p.a.
1968	451	—
1975	392	−1.98%
1982	325	−2.64%
1990	353	+1.04%
1999	353	+0.00%
2007	358	+0.18%
2012	355	−0.17%
2017	361	+0.34%
2023	354	−0.33%
Source: INSEE

== See also ==
- Communes of the Ardennes department
