= Neuville-lès-This =

- Commune
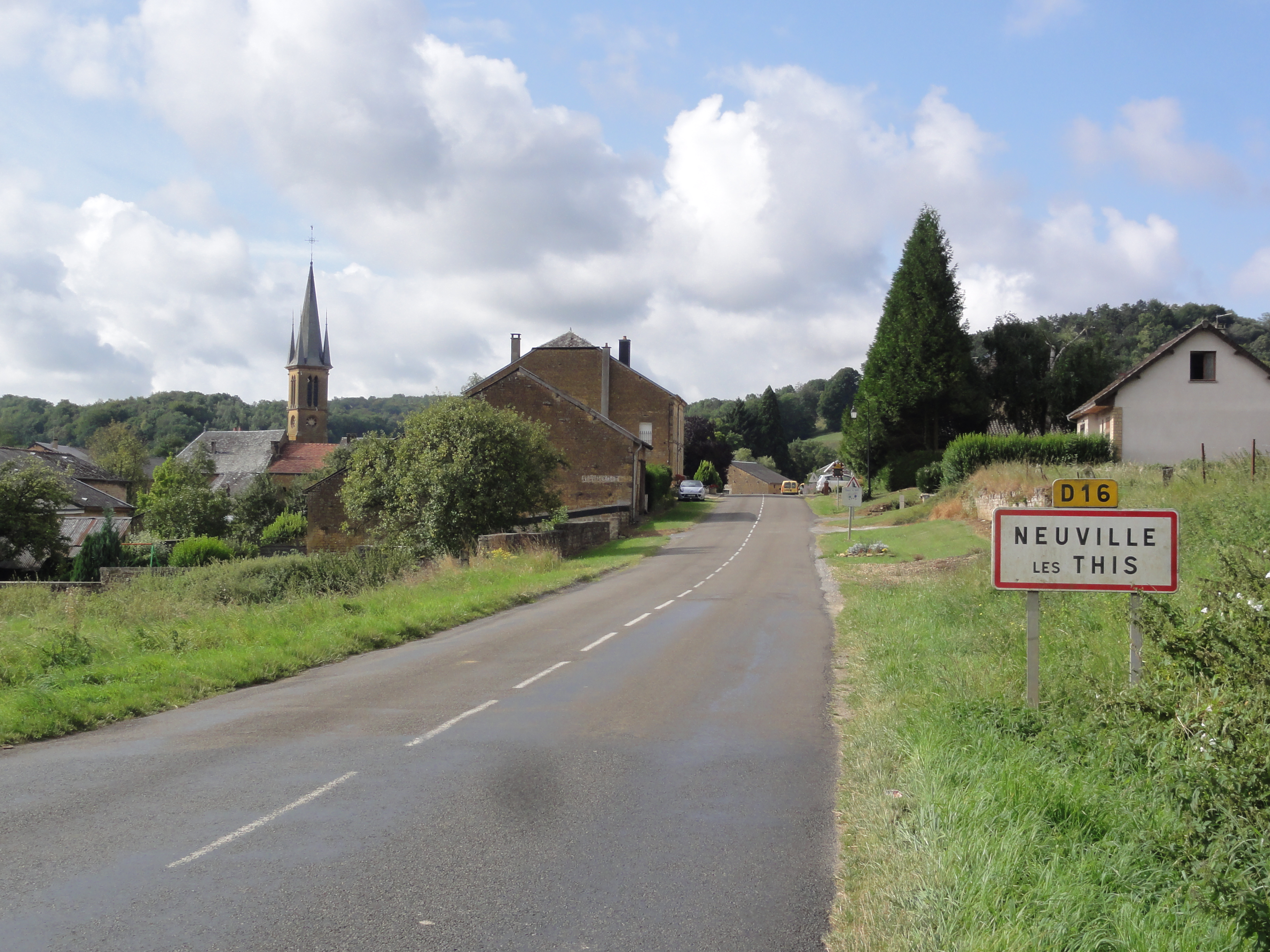
- A general view of Neuville-lès-This
- Location of Neuville-lès-This
- Location within France Location within Grand Est
- Coordinates: 49°44′36″N 4°36′00″E
- Country: France
- Region: Grand Est
- Department: Ardennes
- Arrondissement: Charleville-Mézières
- Canton: Rocroi

Government
  - Mayor (2020–2026): Freddy Thevenin
- Area^{1}: 7.74 km^{2} (2.99 sq mi)
- Elevation: 180 m (590 ft)
- Population (2023): 321
  - Density: 41.5/km^{2} (107/sq mi)
- Time zone: UTC+01:00 (CET)
  - Summer (DST): UTC+02:00 (CEST)
- INSEE/Postal code: 08322 /08090
- ^{1} French Land Register data, which excludes lakes, ponds, glaciers > 1 km^{2} (0.386 sq mi or 247 acres) and river estuaries.

Neuville-lès-This is a commune in the Ardennes department in northern France.

== Population ==
Historical population
Year	Pop.	±% p.a.
1968	256	—
1975	261	+0.28%
1982	301	+2.06%
1990	343	+1.65%
1999	353	+0.32%
2007	396	+1.45%
2012	374	−1.14%
2017	376	+0.11%
2023	321	−2.60%
Source: INSEE

== See also ==
- Communes of the Ardennes department
