= Brognon, Ardennes =

Brognon
- Commune
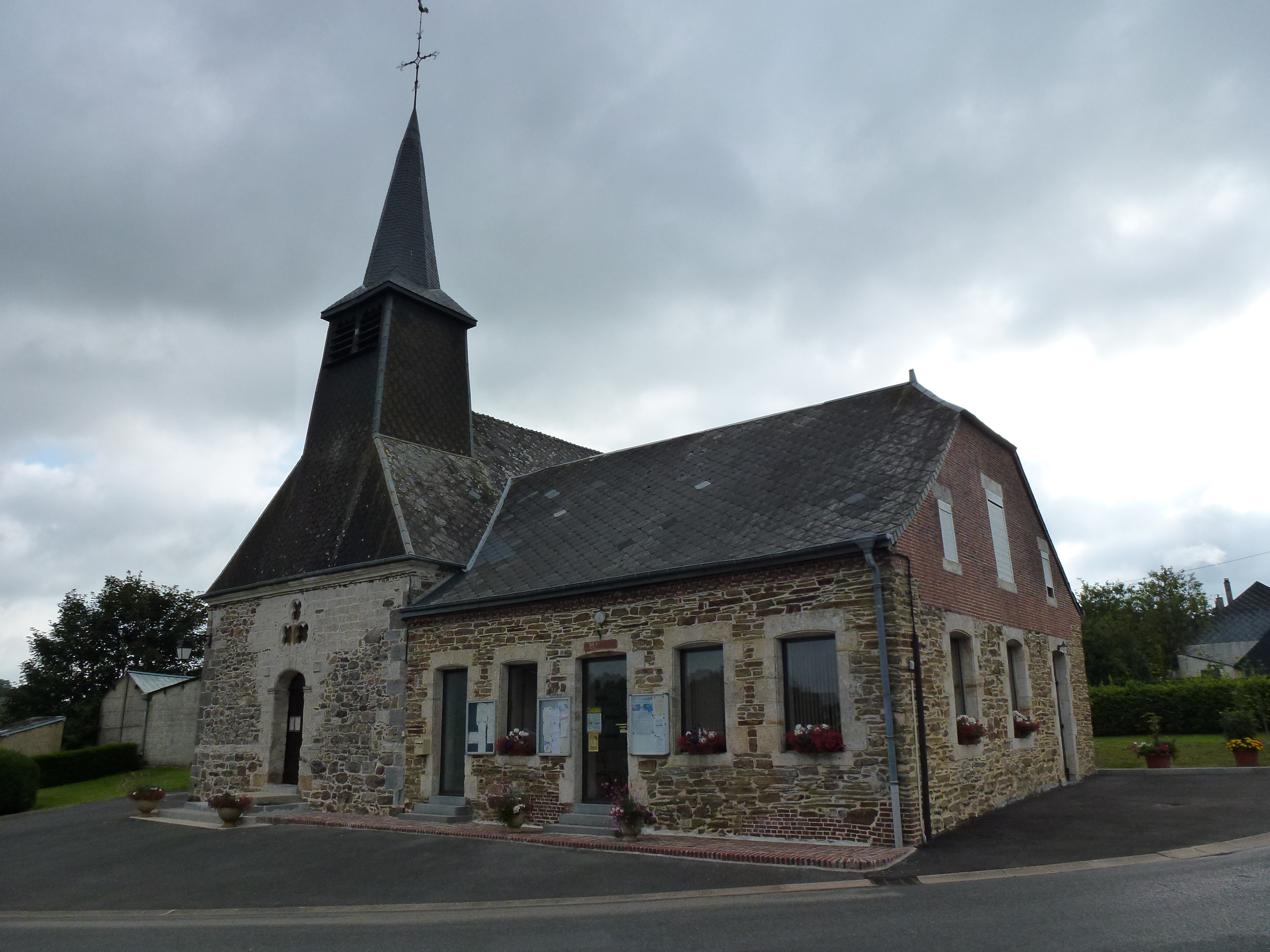
- The church in Brognon

- Coat of arms
- Location of Brognon
- Location within France Location within Grand Est
- Coordinates: 49°55′46″N 4°17′20″E
- Country: France
- Region: Grand Est
- Department: Ardennes
- Arrondissement: Charleville-Mézières
- Canton: Rocroi

Government
  - Mayor (2020–2026): Thierry Hubert
- Area^{1}: 7.38 km^{2} (2.85 sq mi)
- Elevation: 289 m (948 ft)
- Highest elevation: 323 m (1,060 ft)
- Lowest elevation: 251 m (823 ft)
- Population (2023): 130
  - Density: 18/km^{2} (46/sq mi)
- Time zone: UTC+01:00 (CET)
  - Summer (DST): UTC+02:00 (CEST)
- INSEE/Postal code: 08087 /08380
- ^{1} French Land Register data, which excludes lakes, ponds, glaciers > 1 km^{2} (0.386 sq mi or 247 acres) and river estuaries.

Brognon (French pronunciation: [bʁɔɲɔ̃]) is a commune in the Ardennes department in northern France.

== Population ==
Historical population
Year	Pop.	±% p.a.
1968	197	—
1975	167	−2.33%
1982	153	−1.24%
1990	142	−0.93%
1999	126	−1.32%
2007	136	+0.96%
2012	155	+2.65%
2017	148	−0.92%
2023	130	−2.14%
Source: INSEE

== See also ==
- Communes of the Ardennes department
