= Valentin Neuville =

French composer

Valentin Neuville (1863 in Rexpoëde – 1941 in Lyon) was a French composer who studied organ in Brussels and was organist at Saint-Nizier Church, Lyon. His operas Tiphaine, Les Willis, Madeleine, L'Enfant, L'Aveugle were performed between 1899 and 1909 in Belgium, Germany and Sweden with success, but he was not recognized in France where his Wagnerisms were not welcomed.

== Works ==
- Le Trèfle à quatre feuilles, shadow play, private performance Lyon, January 1895, public premiere Brussels March 1898
- Tiphaine, Antwerp 1899, Lyon 1906
- L'Enfant, 1902
- Les Willis, at Rotterdam April 1903
- L'Aveugle, at Kiel, December 1904
- Madeleine, Lyon 1908
