= Neuville-Coppegueule =

- Commune
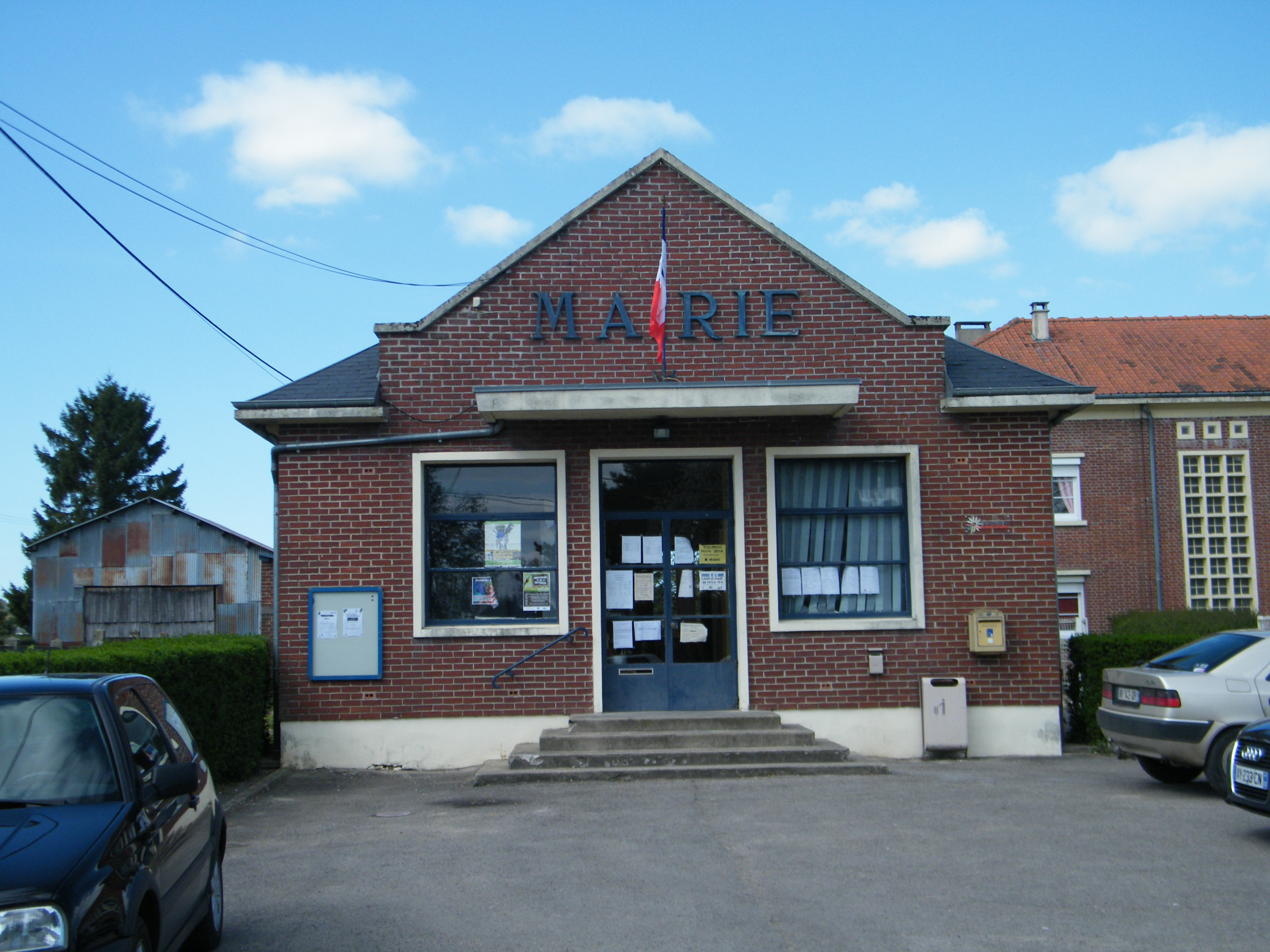
- The town hall in Neuville-Coppegueule
- Location of Neuville-Coppegueule
- Location within France Location within Hauts-de-France
- Coordinates: 49°50′58″N 1°45′22″E
- Country: France
- Region: Hauts-de-France
- Department: Somme
- Arrondissement: Amiens
- Canton: Poix-de-Picardie
- Intercommunality: CC Somme Sud-Ouest

Government
  - Mayor (2020–2026): Jean-Claude Quillent
- Area^{1}: 8.66 km^{2} (3.34 sq mi)
- Elevation: 210 m (690 ft)
- Highest elevation: 204 m (669 ft)
- Lowest elevation: 75 m (246 ft)
- Population (2023): 509
  - Density: 58.8/km^{2} (152/sq mi)
- Time zone: UTC+01:00 (CET)
  - Summer (DST): UTC+02:00 (CEST)
- INSEE/Postal code: 80592 /80430
- ^{1} French Land Register data, which excludes lakes, ponds, glaciers > 1 km^{2} (0.386 sq mi or 247 acres) and river estuaries.

Neuville-Coppegueule (French pronunciation: [nøvil kɔpɡœl]) is a commune in the Somme department in Hauts-de-France in northern France.

== Geography ==
The commune is situated on the D1015 road, some 25 miles (40 km) west of Amiens, near the banks of the river Bresle on the border with Seine-Maritime.
The name comes from the French nickname for highwaymen from the forest of Argueil who operated on the Beauvais - Eu road.

== Population ==
Historical population
Year	Pop.	±% p.a.
1968	647	—
1975	605	−0.95%
1982	614	+0.21%
1990	586	−0.58%
1999	535	−1.01%
2007	593	+1.29%
2012	577	−0.55%
2017	521	−2.02%
2023	509	−0.39%
Source: INSEE

== See also ==
- Communes of the Somme department
