= Maubert-Fontaine =

- Commune
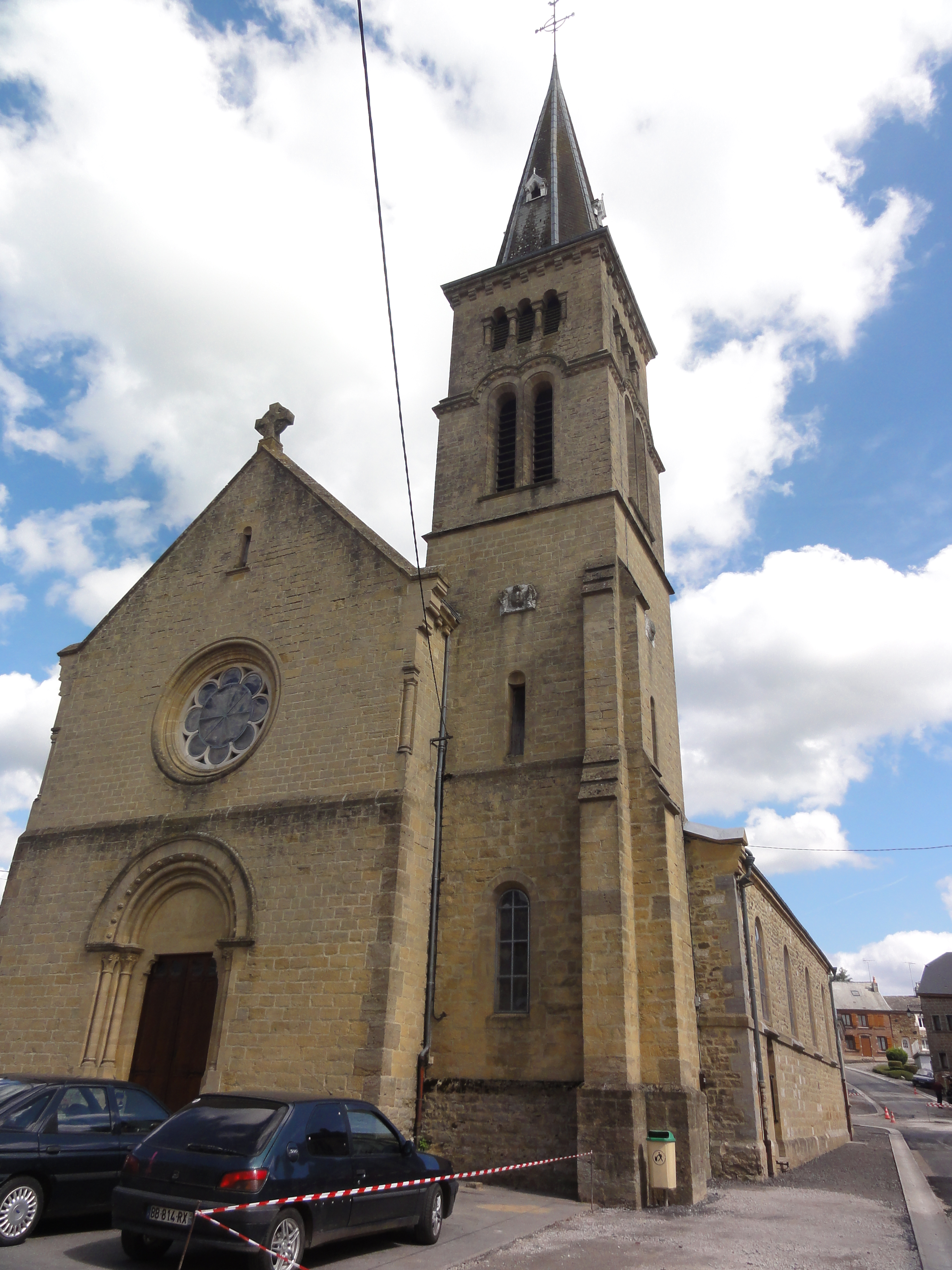
- The church in Maubert-Fontaine

- Coat of arms
- Location of Maubert-Fontaine
- Location within France Location within Grand Est
- Coordinates: 49°52′07″N 4°25′46″E
- Country: France
- Region: Grand Est
- Department: Ardennes
- Arrondissement: Charleville-Mézières
- Canton: Rocroi

Government
  - Mayor (2020–2026): Christian Mougin
- Area^{1}: 10.33 km^{2} (3.99 sq mi)
- Elevation: 280 m (920 ft)
- Population (2023): 1,023
  - Density: 99.03/km^{2} (256.5/sq mi)
- Time zone: UTC+01:00 (CET)
  - Summer (DST): UTC+02:00 (CEST)
- INSEE/Postal code: 08282 /08260
- ^{1} French Land Register data, which excludes lakes, ponds, glaciers > 1 km^{2} (0.386 sq mi or 247 acres) and river estuaries.

Maubert-Fontaine (French pronunciation: [mobɛʁ fɔ̃tɛn]) is a commune in the Ardennes department in northern France.

== Population ==
Historical population
Year	Pop.	±% p.a.
1968	1,065	—
1975	970	−1.33%
1982	1,024	+0.78%
1990	916	−1.38%
1999	902	−0.17%
2007	1,075	+2.22%
2012	1,033	−0.79%
2017	1,031	−0.04%
2023	1,023	−0.13%
Source: INSEE

== See also ==
- Communes of the Ardennes department
