= Tarzy =

- Commune
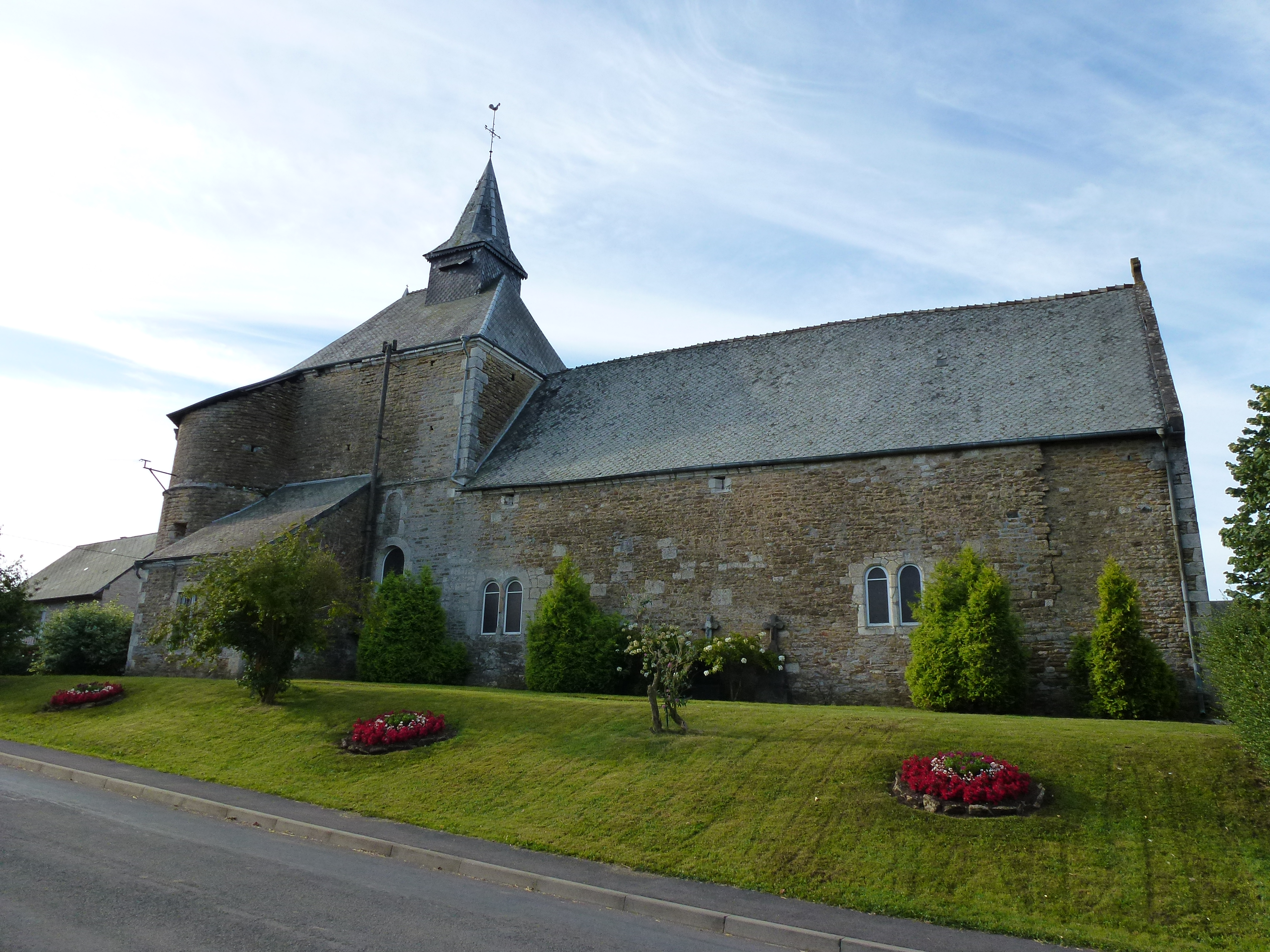
- The church in Tarzy

- Coat of arms
- Location of Tarzy
- Location within France Location within Grand Est
- Coordinates: 49°52′16″N 4°17′45″E
- Country: France
- Region: Grand Est
- Department: Ardennes
- Arrondissement: Charleville-Mézières
- Canton: Rocroi

Government
  - Mayor (2020–2026): Jean-Marie Devaux
- Area^{1}: 10.12 km^{2} (3.91 sq mi)
- Elevation: 244 m (801 ft)
- Population (2023): 126
  - Density: 12.5/km^{2} (32.2/sq mi)
- Time zone: UTC+01:00 (CET)
  - Summer (DST): UTC+02:00 (CEST)
- INSEE/Postal code: 08440 /08380
- ^{1} French Land Register data, which excludes lakes, ponds, glaciers > 1 km^{2} (0.386 sq mi or 247 acres) and river estuaries.

Tarzy (French pronunciation: [taʁzi]) is a commune in the Ardennes department in northern France.

== Population ==
Historical population
Year	Pop.	±% p.a.
1968	181	—
1975	159	−1.83%
1982	138	−2.00%
1990	127	−1.03%
1999	137	+0.85%
2007	143	+0.54%
2012	146	+0.42%
2017	154	+1.07%
2023	126	−3.29%
Source: INSEE

== See also ==
- Communes of the Ardennes department
