= Faux (river) =

River in France

Faux Fau
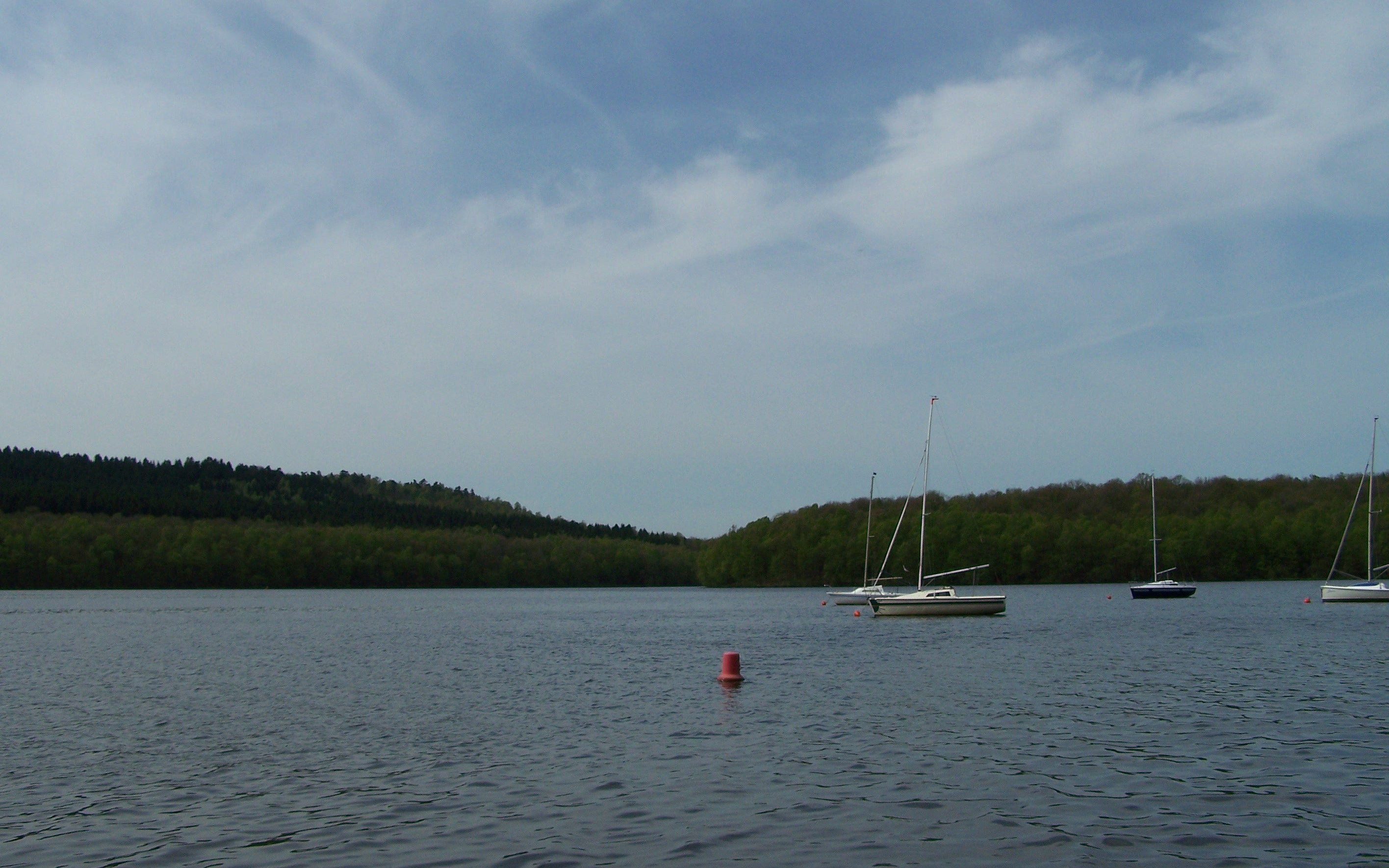
- Lac des Vieilles Forges

- Location within France Location within Grand Est

Location
- Country: France

Physical characteristics
- Source
  - location: Les Mazures
  - coordinates: 49°53′19″N 4°39′23″E
- Mouth
  - location: Meuse at Revin
  - coordinates: 49°55′57″N 4°37′32″E
- Length: 19.4 km (12.1 mi)

Basin features
- Progression: Meuse→ North Sea

The Fau or Faux, also known as ruisseau de Faux (the "creek Faux") is a small but abundant river of the department of the Ardennes in France. It is a left-bank tributary of the Meuse.

== Geography ==
The Faux has its source to the east of the town of Les Mazures in the western part of the Massif of the Ardennes (Massif ardennais) located south of the Franco-Belgian border (south of the province of Namur) at a height of 380 m. At the place where it is born, it turns south, but soon after begins a wide loop that takes it north and then northeast. After a route of 19.4 kilometers, it merges with the Meuse at Revin. It is fed by numerous and abundant streams which, like it, flow down from the Ardennes massif

It bathes the towns of Bourg-Fidèle and Revin, but the river mostly runs in the middle of the forest.

== Municipalities and townships crossed ==
In the Ardennes department alone, the Faux crosses the following seven municipalities, from upstream to downstream: Les Mazures (source), Sécheval, Renwez, Harcy, Bourg-Fidèle, Rocroi, Revin (confluence).

The source of the Faux is in the canton of Bogny-sur-Meuse, it then crosses the canton of Charleville-Mézières-2, the canton of Rocroi, and has its confluence in the canton of Revin, in the arrondissement of Charleville-Mézières.

== Managing body ==
The managing body of the Faux and its tributaries is the Établissement public territorial de bassin (EPTB) EPAMA. The Faux is part of the Meuse zone from the confluence of the Chiers to the confluence of the Semois.

== Tributaries ==
The Faux has seven referenced tributaries:

- the Herbiaux stream (rg), with a tributary:
  - the Vieux Pré stream (rg),
- the Cuviseau stream (rg), with two tributaries:
  - the Maillard (rg)
  - the stream of Sécheval (rd),
- the Le Noir stream (rg) which merges into the Vieilles Forges lake with two tributaries:
  - the brook of Fond de Fallette (rg),
  - the brook of Pont Gilles (rg)
- the Galop stream (rg), with a tributary:
  - the Gravelle stream (rg),
- the Marie (rd),
- the Moulins stream (rg), with two tributaries:
  - the Moulin Manceau stream (rg)
  - the Rond Terne stream (rg),
- the Champ Fleury stream (rg)

Its Strahler number is therefore three.

== Hydrology ==
The Faux Basin is almost entirely located in an area with high rainfall. The modulus of the river at the confluence of the Meuse is 1.78 m^{3}/s (63 cu ft/s), for a small watershed of 96.9 km^{2} (37.4 sq mi).

The depth of runoff of water flowing in this basin is 579 millimeters, which is high, much higher than that of the average for France, all basins combined, and even compared to the various rivers of the Meuse basin, generally very abundant. The average of the French basin of the Meuse at Chooz, near the Faux's exit from French territory, shows a water depth of 450 millimeters.
