= Laifour station =

French railway station

Coordinates: 49°54′41″N 4°41′34″E

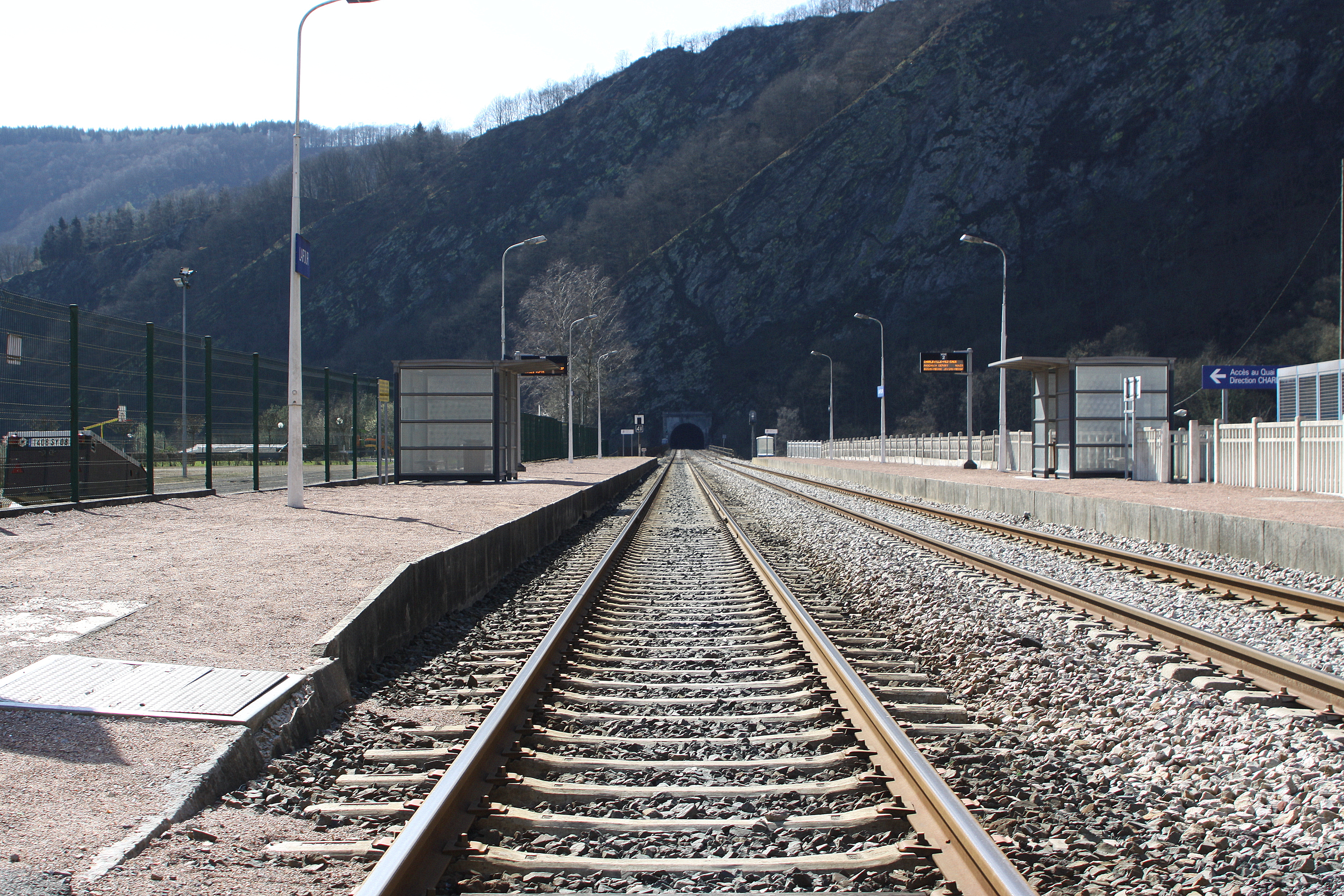
Laifour station

Laifour station (French: Gare de Laifour) is a TER railway station in Laifour, France, in the Ardennes département. The station is served by regional trains of the TER Grand Est on the line from Charleville-Mézières to Givet. There is no ticket machine.

Preceding station	TER Grand Est	Following station
Anchamps towards Givet	C07	Deville towards Charleville-Mézières

== See also ==
- List of SNCF stations in Grand Est
