= Monthermé – Hautes-Rivières – Sorendal – Membre railway =

Railway line in France

Coordinates: 49.86702°N 4.74114°E

Monthermé – Hautes-Rivières – Sorendal – Membre
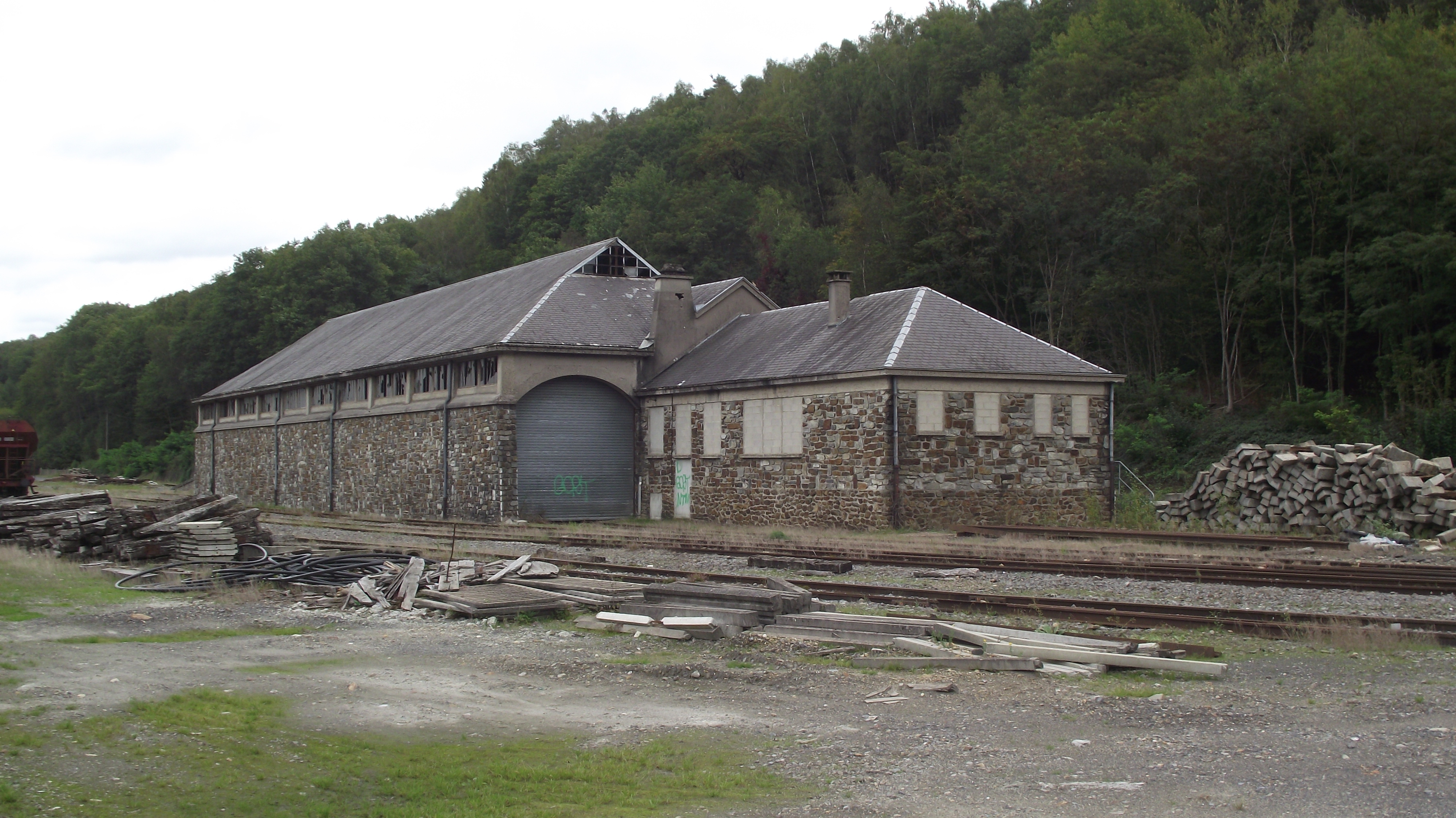
- Former Depot at Monthermé

Technical
- Line length: 27 km (17 mi)
- Track gauge: Until 1923: 800 mm (2 ft 7 1/2 in) after 1923: 1,000 mm (3 ft 3 3/8 in)
Route map
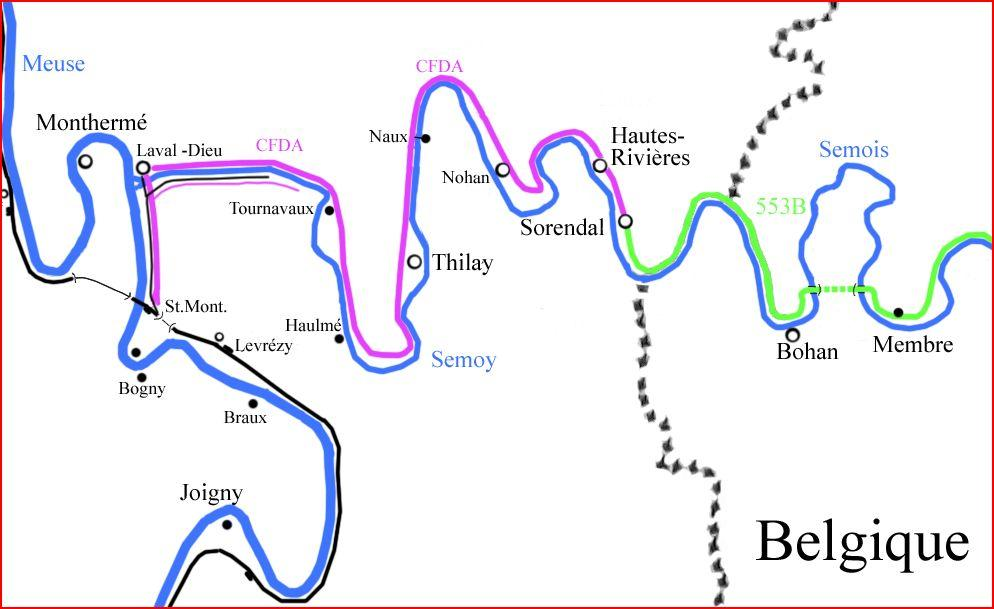

The Monthermé – Hautes-Rivières – Sorendal – Membre railway, locally also known as the Petit Train de la Semoy, was a 27-kilometre (17-mile) long narrow gauge and later metre gauge (1,000 mm / 3 ft 3 3/8 in) railway in the north of France, which was put into service section by section from 1901 until 1935 and operated until 1950.

== History ==
The first section of the French Chemins de fer départementaux des Ardennes (CA), with a track gauge of 1,000 mm (3 ft 3 3/8 in), ran along the northern bank of the Semois river from Monthermé to Hautes-Rivières. It was opened on 19 October 1901 and extended to Sorendal on 1 May 1914.

Right at the beginning of World War I, the German forces dismantled the tracks in order to transport them away and lay them again elsewhere. In the post-war period the line was rebuilt and in 1938 it was extended to the Belgian border at Bohan-sur-Semois. It was put into service for cross-border traffic on 17 October 1938. The CA trains never went further than Sorendal.

The Belgian National Company of Light Railways (SNCV) did not reach Bohan until 1935, because extensive construction work had to be carried out on a 220-metre (720 ft) tunnel and two bridges. At the beginning of the Second World War, international traffic between France and Belgium was suspended and never resumed after the war. The bridges and the tunnel were destroyed during the German withdrawal and never rebuilt. The French section of the line was closed in 1950.

A hiking and cycling trail was built on the route of the former line, the Trans-Semoysienne, opened in 2016.

== Operation ==
Traction was provided by a 24-tonne (24-long-ton; 26-short-ton) service weight Corpet-Louvet steam locomotive coupled to a tender loaded with water, coal and 10 kg (22 lb) briquettes. It could pull two passenger coaches and several goods wagons. The line had three turntables to turn the locomotives at Monthermé, Hautes-Rivières and Sorendal.

== Stations ==
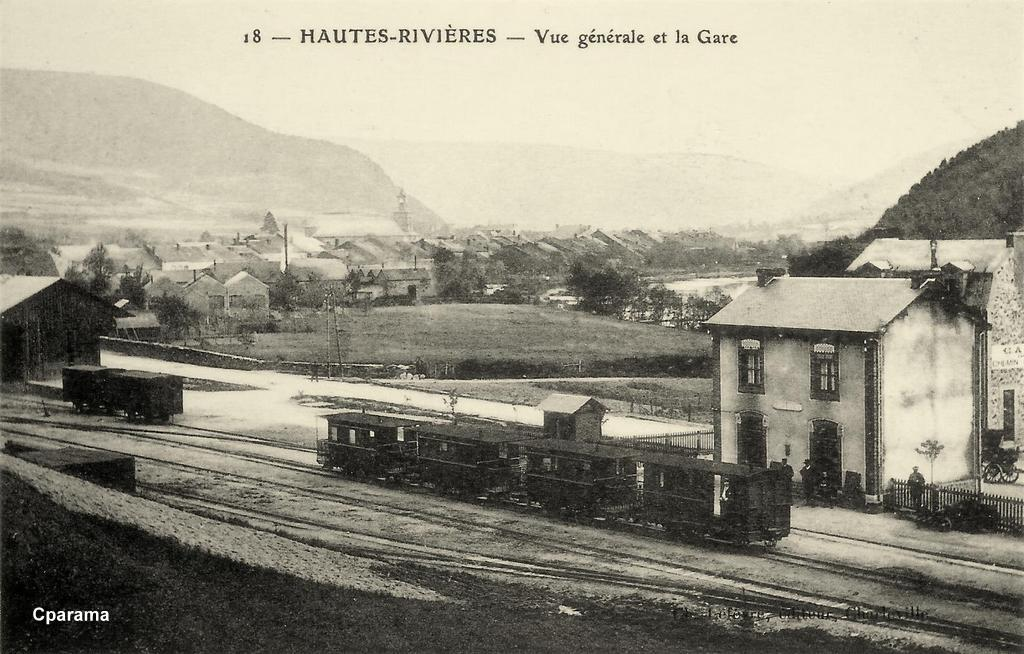
Hautes-Rivières

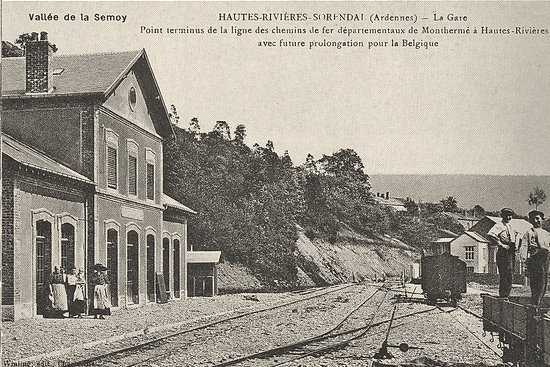
Terminus of the narrow gauge railway in Sorendal with future extension to Belgium
