= Louis Matout =

French painter

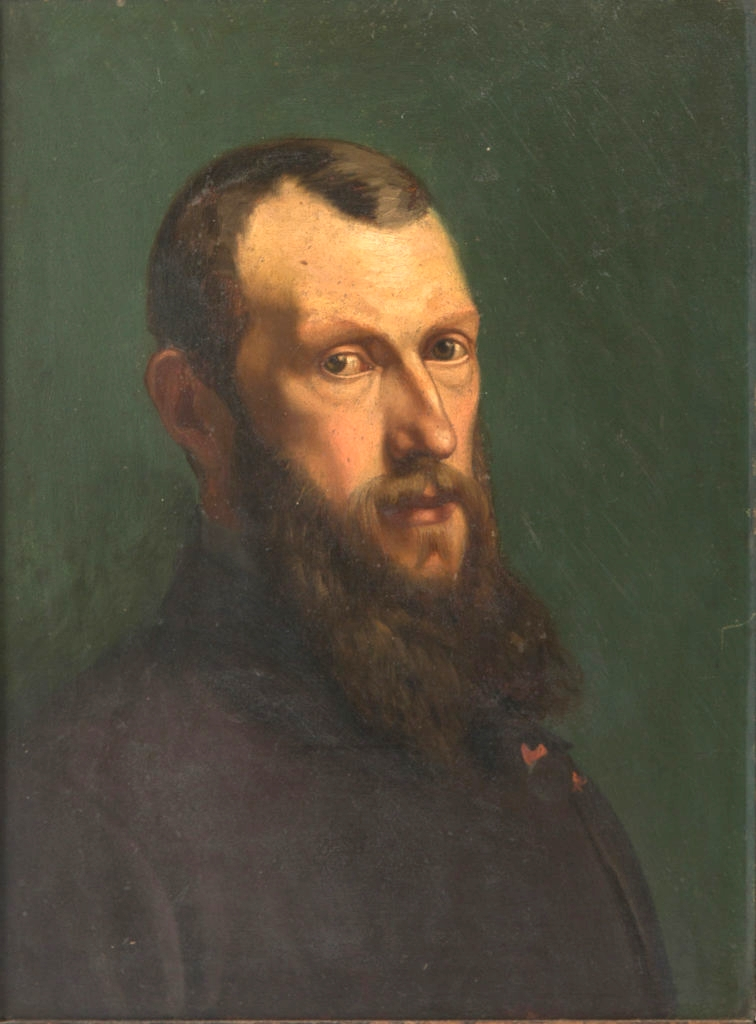
Self-portrait (date unknown)

Louis Nicolas Matout (19 March 1811, in Renwez – 24 January 1888, in Paris) was a French painter and muralist. He was known primarily for cityscapes with figures and genre scenes.

== Biography ==
He was from a family of modest means but, thanks to the generosity of an architect he met at a construction site where he was employed, he was able to gain admission to the École nationale supérieure des beaux-arts in Paris.

His first exhibit at the Salon came in 1833 and he would continue to have showings there until 1879. A major commission came his way in 1852, when the Minister of Finance, Achille Fould, engaged him to create a painting on the subject of Dr. Ambroise Paré performing a ligature, to replace a dilapidated fresco painted by Esprit Antoine Gibelin in 1778, along with the two frescoes that framed it, in the Grand Amphithéâtre of the Faculté de médecine de Paris. The two adjoining frescoes were replaced with tableaux of Lanfranc and Pierre-Joseph Desault. These and the remaining frescoes by Gibelin were destroyed by a fire in 1889.

The publicity engendered by this project led to several other public works, notably at St-Gervais-et-St-Protais, the Church of Saint-Merri and the Church of Saint-Sulpice. Later, he worked at the Cathedral of St Philippe in Algiers (now the Ketchaoua Mosque), La Rochelle Cathedral and Angoulême Cathedral. He had a major showing at the Exposition Universelle (1867). He was named a Chevalier in the Legion of Honor in 1857.

His works may be seen at the Louvre, the Musée Fesch and at numerous small museums throughout France.

== Selected paintings ==
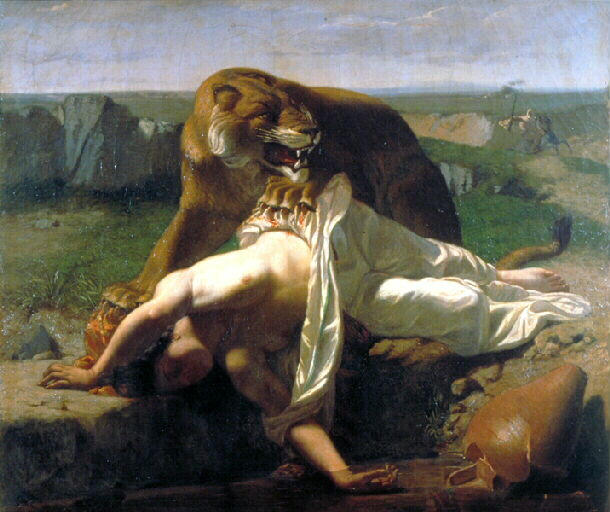
Algerian Woman
Killed by a Lioness

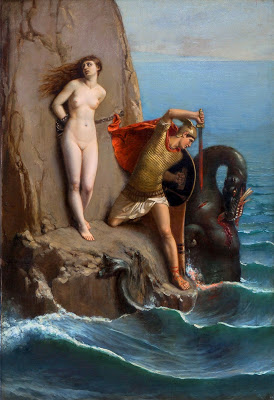
Perseus and Andromeda

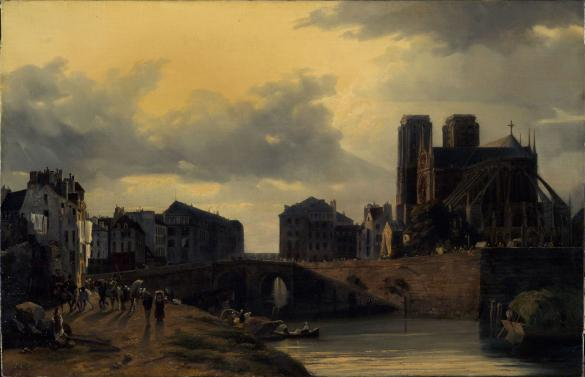
View of Notre Dame

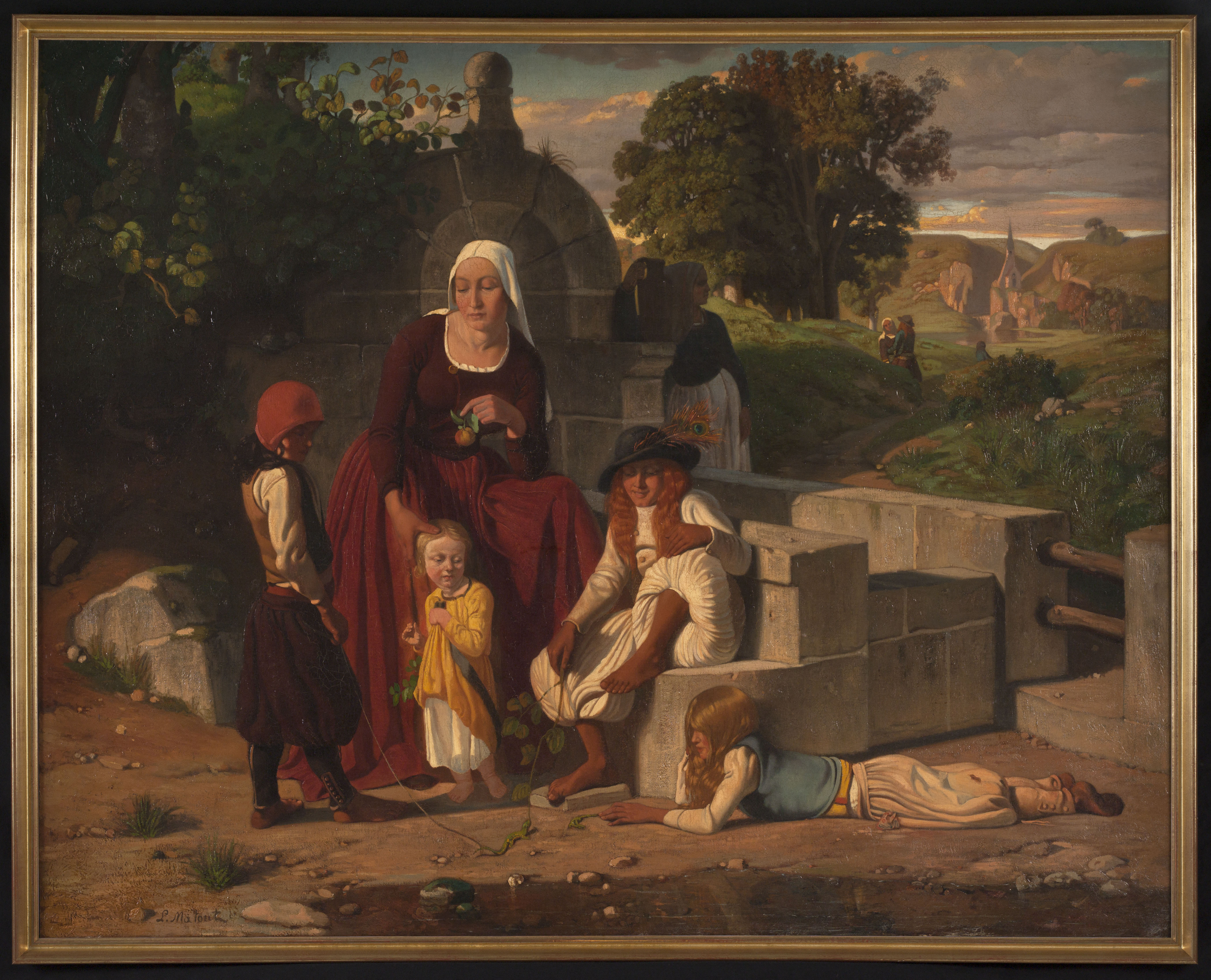
At the Fountain
