= Lac des Vieilles Forges =

Reservoir in France

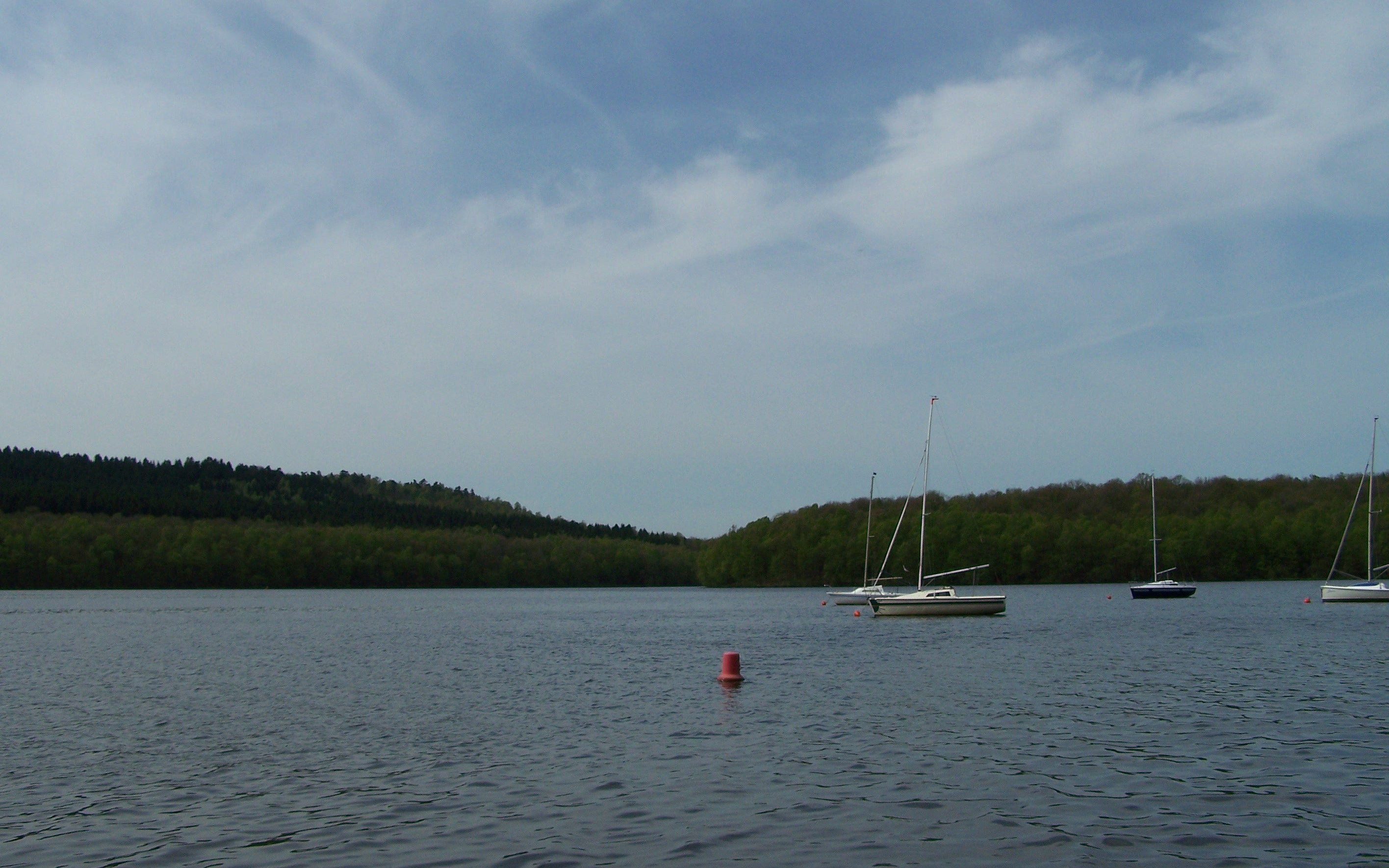

- Location within Grand Est
- Location: Renwez, Ardennes
- Coordinates: 49°52′20″N 4°35′58″E
- Type: reservoir
- Primary inflows: Faux
- Primary outflows: Faux
- Basin countries: France
- Surface area: 1.4 km^{2} (0.54 sq mi)
- Average depth: 4 m (13 ft)
- Max. depth: 7 m (23 ft)
- Shore length^{1}: 11.6 km (7.2 mi)
- Surface elevation: 340 m (1,120 ft)
- ^{1} Shore length is not a well-defined measure.

Lac des Vieilles Forges is a lake at Renwez in Ardennes, France. The reservoir has a surface area of 1.4 km². It is located at an elevation of 340 m. It is fed and drained by the river Faux, a tributary of the Meuse.
