= Poix-Terron =

- Commune
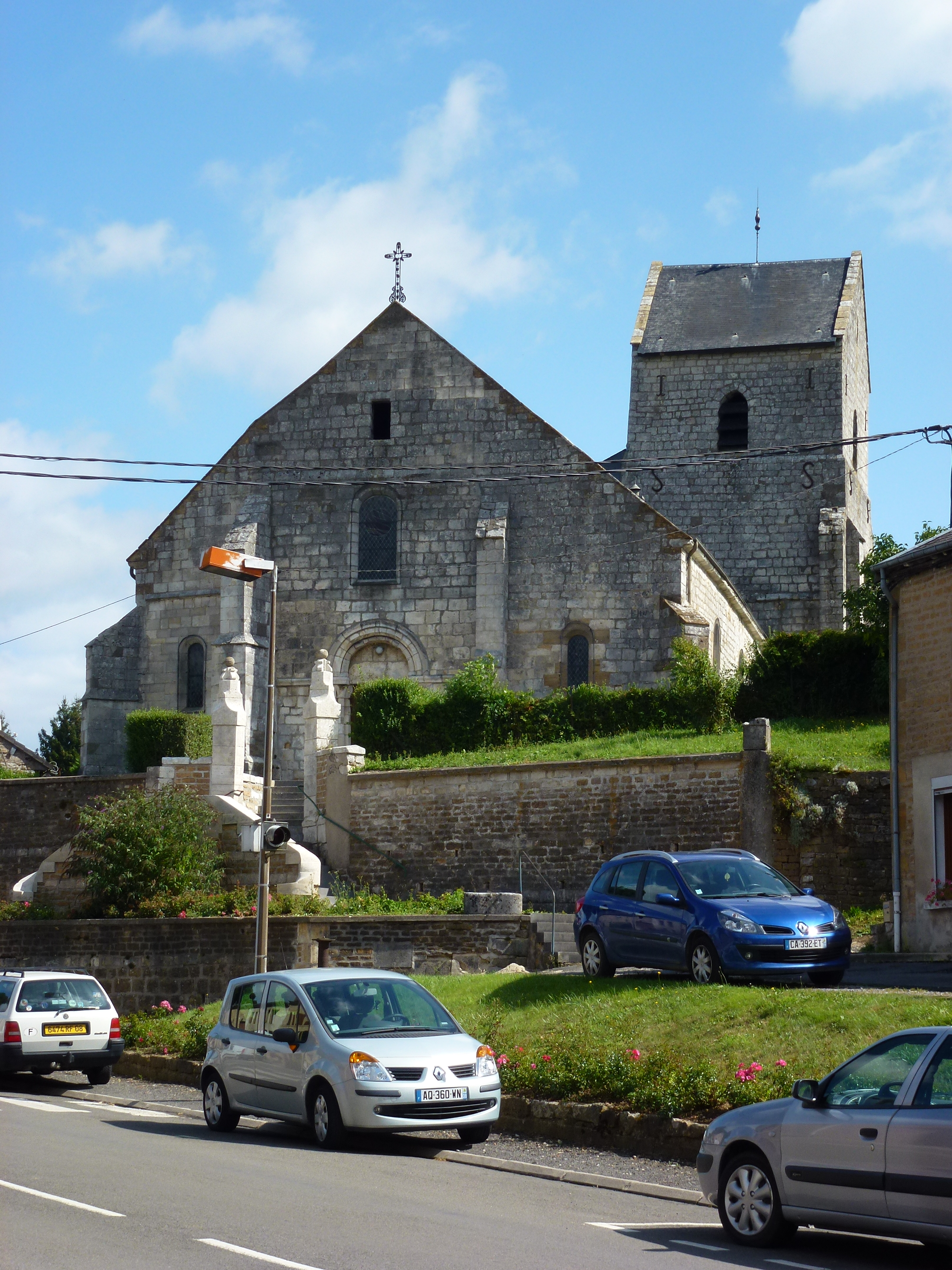
- The church in Poix-Terron

- Coat of arms
- Location of Poix-Terron
- Location within France Location within Grand Est
- Coordinates: 49°38′59″N 4°38′27″E
- Country: France
- Region: Grand Est
- Department: Ardennes
- Arrondissement: Charleville-Mézières
- Canton: Nouvion-sur-Meuse
- Intercommunality: Crêtes Préardennaises

Government
  - Mayor (2020–2026): Jean-Marie Oudart
- Area^{1}: 14.26 km^{2} (5.51 sq mi)
- Elevation: 178 m (584 ft)
- Highest elevation: 299 m (981 ft)
- Lowest elevation: 171 m (561 ft)
- Population (2023): 883
  - Density: 61.9/km^{2} (160/sq mi)
- Time zone: UTC+01:00 (CET)
  - Summer (DST): UTC+02:00 (CEST)
- INSEE/Postal code: 08341 /08430
- ^{1} French Land Register data, which excludes lakes, ponds, glaciers > 1 km^{2} (0.386 sq mi or 247 acres) and river estuaries.

Poix-Terron (French pronunciation: [pwa tɛʁɔ̃]) is a commune located in the department of Ardennes, in the Grand Est (lit. "Great East") region of France.

The commune is listed as a Village étape.

== Geography ==
Two villages belong to the commune: Poix, and the churchless Terron-les-Poix. Poix became Poix-Terron in 1897. Poix is located on the N51, 18 km from Charleville-Mézières, and 28 km from Rethel. Terron is located 1.5 km from Poix on the D27. The river Vence flows through the commune.

The Poix-Terron railway station is on the Soissons–Givet railway between Reims and Charleville-Mézières. The station was reopened on 1 October 2011.

== History ==
The town has suffered during religious wars: there was a fire in the village and castle in 1641, and a siege of the church on 8 July 1651. King Louis XIV passed through on 25 June and 7 August 1654.

On 30 August 1870, during the Franco-German war, the Affaire de Poix (The Poix Case, lit. "Poix Affair") occurred, involving the 42nd infantry regiment.

On 14 May 1940, a breach, 8 km in length, occurred between Poix-Terron and Baâlons in the French line of defence. A battalion of Spahis attempted to close the breach and held against the Germans in the battle of the Horgne.

== Politics and Administration ==
List of successive mayors
Period		Name
March 2001	March 2008	René Chevalier
March 2008	March 2014	Jean-Claude Nemery
March 2014	present	Jean-Marie Oudard

== Demographics ==
Historical population
Year	Pop.	±% p.a.
1968	693	—
1975	648	−0.95%
1982	679	+0.67%
1990	736	+1.01%
1999	804	+0.99%
2007	830	+0.40%
2012	841	+0.26%
2017	819	−0.53%
2023	883	+1.26%
Source: INSEE

== Places and Monuments ==
- The Roman Catholic church of Saint-Martin of Poix-Terron, built in white stone, is a historical monument, registered as such on 19 July 1926. The bell, which dates from 1599, is classified as a historical monument. In 2008, the stained-glass windows were restored and a new window depicting Saint Martin was added.
- The Monument to the Dead in front of the town hall.

== Famous people from the Commune ==
- General Léon Pillere (1844-1911), born in the town, commanded the 60th infantry brigade.

== See also ==
- Communes of the Ardennes department
