= Poix-Terron station =

Railway station in Poix-Terron, France

Poix-Terron
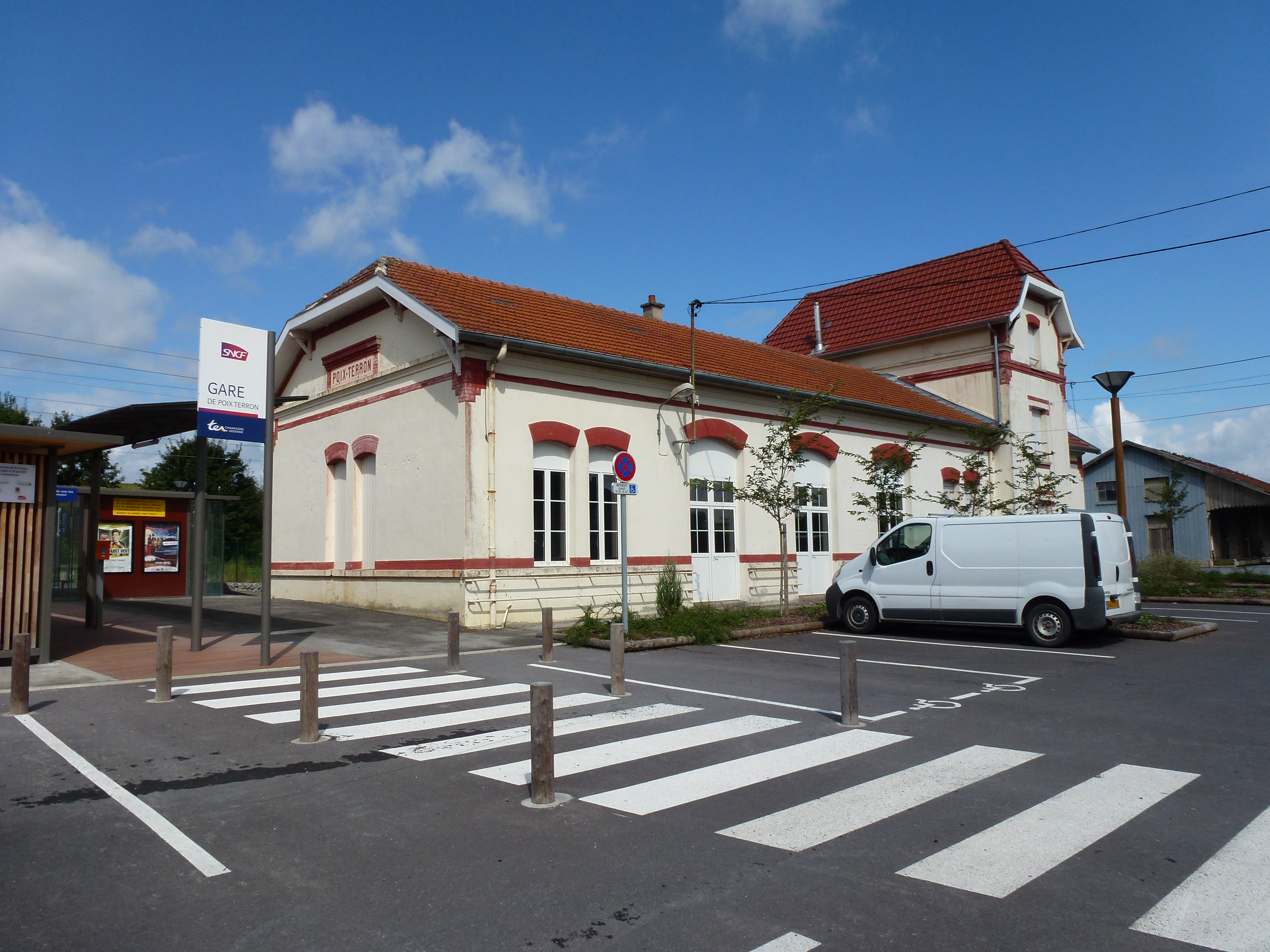

General information
- Location: Rue de la Gare; 08430 Poix-Terron; Ardennes; France
- Coordinates: 49°39′00″N 4°38′12″E
- Elevation: 178 m (584 ft)
- Platforms: 2
- Tracks: 2

Construction
- Structure type: At-grade
- Parking: yes
- Cycle facilities: yes
- Architectural style: original building: Type C "Est" *new building: Chemins de fer de l'Est "Reconstruction" style

Other information
- Status: Unstaffed

History
- Opened: 15 September 1858
- Closed: Late 20th century
- Rebuilt: 2011
- Original company: Compagnie des chemins de fer des Ardennes

Passengers
- 89 351 (in 2019)

Services
Preceding station	TER Grand Est	Following station
Amagne-Lucquy towards Champagne-Ardenne TGV	C01	Charleville-Mézières towards Sedan
Location

Poix-Terron station (French: Gare de Poix-Terron) is a French railway station on the Soissons to Givet rail line, located near the downtown area of the commune of Poix-Terron, in the Ardennes department, Grand Est.

The station was opened in 1858 by the Compagnie des chemins de fer des Ardennes. It closed at the end of the 20th century and re-opened in 2011.

The station is operated by the SNCF with TER Grand Est service.

== Geographical Location ==
Located at an altitude of 178 meters, Poix-Terron station is located at Kilometric point (PK) 126.2 of the Soissons-Givet rail line, between the currently operating stations of Amagne – Lucquy and Mohon.

The two-track rail line has two platforms at the station.

== History ==
The station was commissioned 15 September 1858 by the Compagnie des chemins de fer des Ardennes, when it opened the Rethel to Charleville section of the Soissons-Givet railway line.

The first station at the site (destroyed during World War I) was a Type C station building for the Chemins de fer de l'Est. It was replaced by a medium-sized "Reconstruction" type station, built in 1920. It has a wing with five bays, operating as a ticket office, a waiting room, and a storage room for luggage.

At the end of the 20th century the station became a simple passenger stop before being completely closed to passenger and freight traffic.

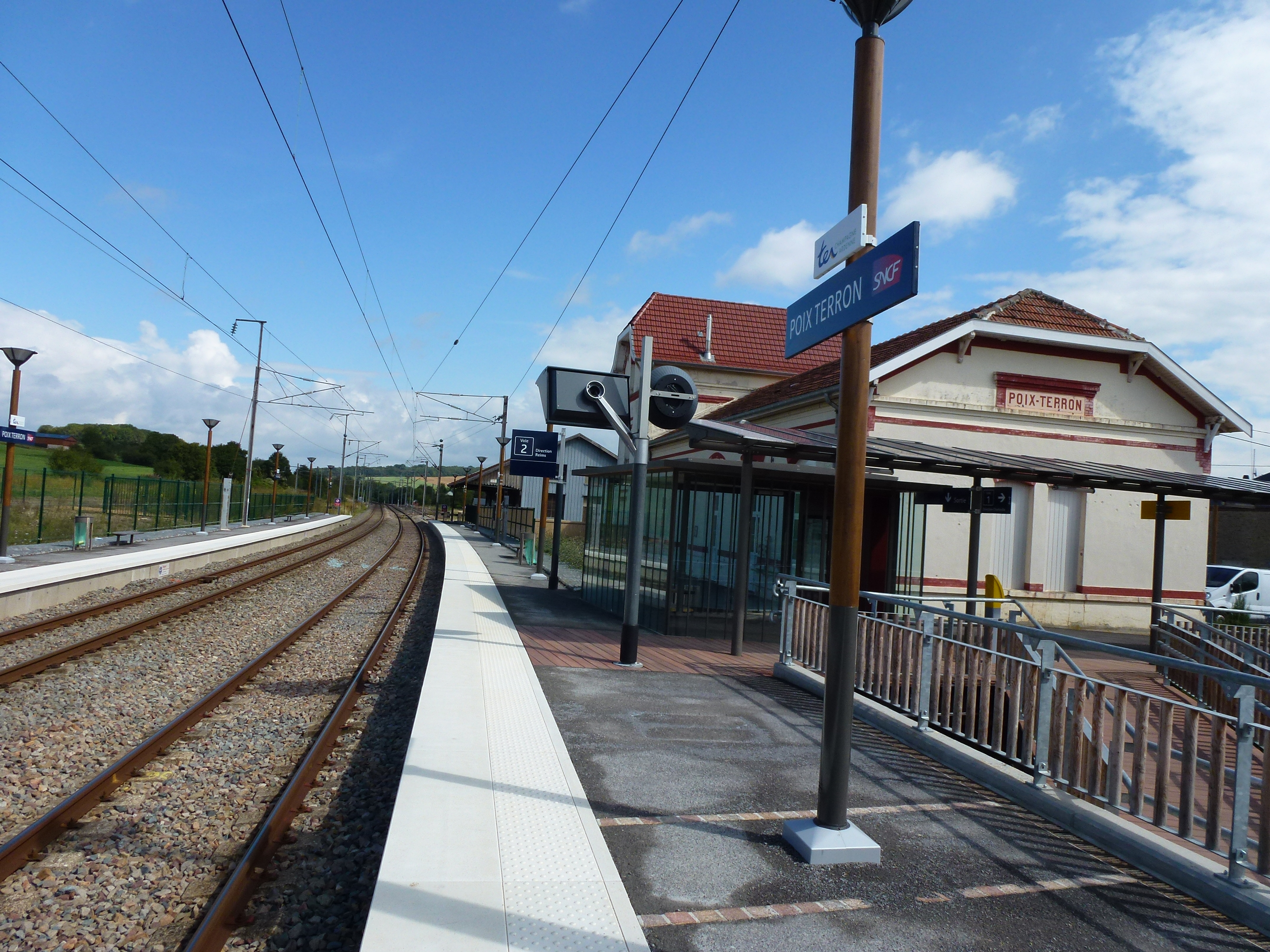
The station shown in 2012.

In 2009, with the opening of an Apprenticeship Training Center (CFA Centre de formation d'apprentissage), a plan was made to re-open the passenger station, for service to the Training Center. Construction started in Spring 2011, with an overall cost of 3.44 million Euros, expenses shared between the State, the Region, the Departement, the Commune, the Communauté de communes des Crêtes Préardennaises, the RFF and the SNCF.

A redesign of the old passenger stop included the creation an underground passage, construction of two platforms (120 meters long and 55 cm high) for accessibility purposes with the newer generation of TER trains, a locked, secure bicycle shelter and a parking lot. The facilities were designed using an "eco-sustainable" approach, consisting of wooden shelters with a green roof, low-energy lighting and a photovoltaic glass canopy.

The new station opened on 29 August 2011. The official opening was celebrated 1 October 2011, with the presence of representatives from all levels of government that were involved in project financing. For the ceremony, an Autorail grande capacité (AGC) painted in the colours of the commune was brought in and a local railway history display was shown at the station and at other locations in the commune.

Reports indicate that in 2012, a year after opening, the station is used by a thousand people each week. These include apprentice students as planned, but also the residents of the town and the surrounding area. The train service offers 14 daily stops at the station.

== Usage statistics ==
According to estimates from the SNCF, the annual passenger numbers at the station are shown in the table below.

	2019	2018	2017	2016	2015
Number of passengers	89,351	79,069	77,877	70,173	62,413

== Passenger services ==
=== Facilities ===
An unstaffed SNCF passenger stop, featuring a two-track, open access design with passenger shelters and a ticket vending machine. A point of sale for TER tickets is open every day in a florist's shop at No.36 on the main street of Poix-Terron.

An underground walkway allows passengers to cross the tracks and allows passage from one platform to the other.

=== Train Services ===
Poix-Terron is served by regional trains from the TER Grand Est network, with destinations being Reims, Charleville-Mézières and Sedan.

=== Parking facilities ===
The station includes a bicycle stand and parking lot.

== Railway Heritage ==
Unused for rail service, the old passenger building was refurbished (with a restoration of the facades) by the SNCF, after the opening of the new passenger stop.

The former station building was a particular type built by the Chemins de fer de l'Est to replace those lost during World War I, according to a standard plan from before the war (first seen in 1903). Other stations using the design were built (until the beginning of the 1930s) on new lines or to replace station buildings that had become too cramped.

Three standard types using this design have been built, one for large stations, one for medium-sized stations and one for halts and small stations; the building at Poix-Terron corresponds to the second type, larger than the simple passenger stop but with a small accommodation area for the station master.

== See also ==
- List of SNCF stations in Grand Est
