= Haulmé =

- Commune
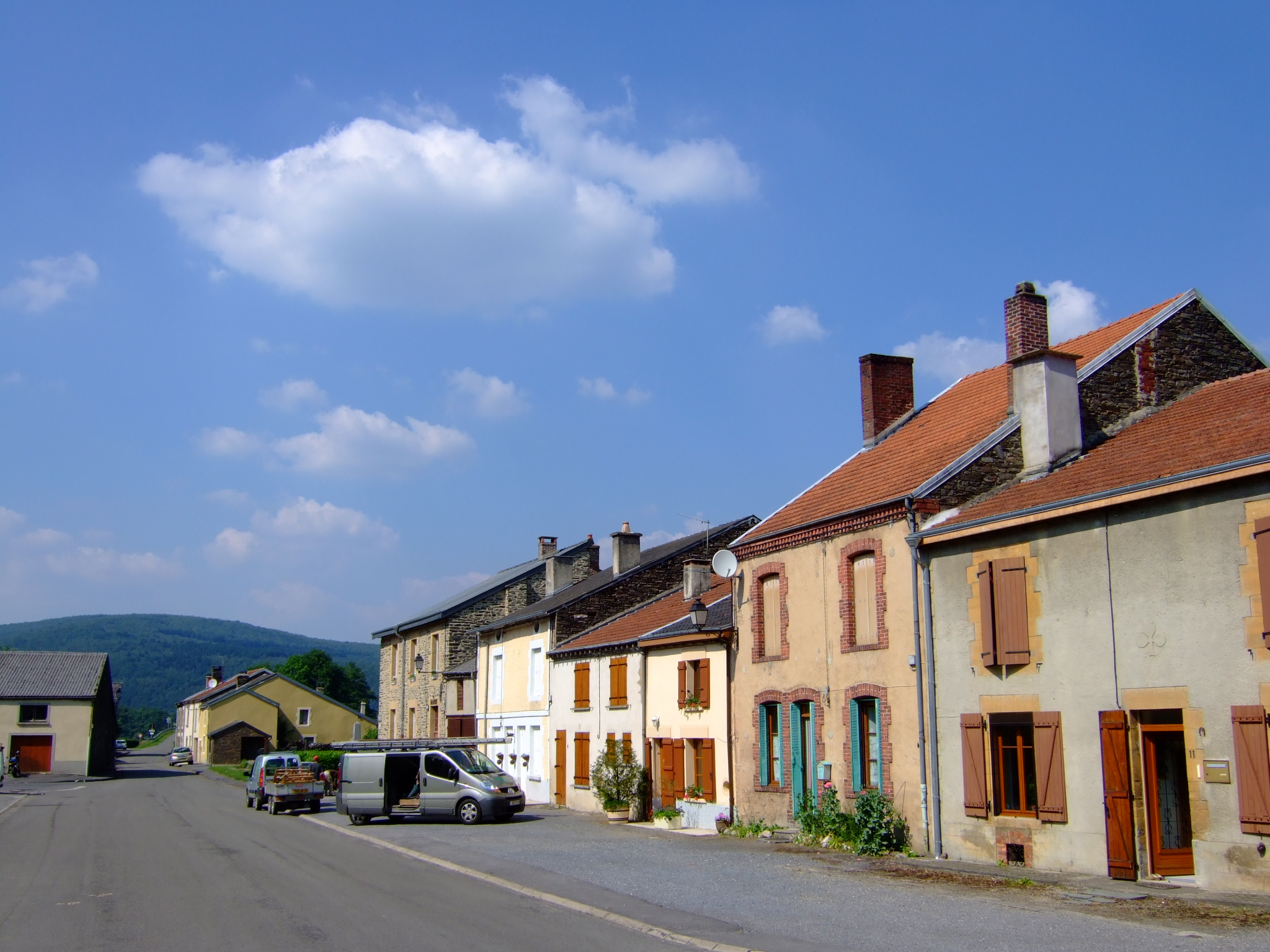
- A general view of Haulmé

- Coat of arms
- Location of Haulmé
- Location within France Location within Grand Est
- Coordinates: 49°51′41″N 4°47′11″E
- Country: France
- Region: Grand Est
- Department: Ardennes
- Arrondissement: Charleville-Mézières
- Canton: Bogny-sur-Meuse

Government
  - Mayor (2020–2026): Alain Mous
- Area^{1}: 3.63 km^{2} (1.40 sq mi)
- Elevation: 170 m (560 ft)
- Population (2023): 88
  - Density: 24/km^{2} (63/sq mi)
- Time zone: UTC+01:00 (CET)
  - Summer (DST): UTC+02:00 (CEST)
- INSEE/Postal code: 08217 /08800
- ^{1} French Land Register data, which excludes lakes, ponds, glaciers > 1 km^{2} (0.386 sq mi or 247 acres) and river estuaries.

Haulmé is a commune in the Ardennes department in northern France.

== Population ==
Historical population
Year	Pop.	±% p.a.
1968	115	—
1975	108	−0.89%
1982	93	−2.11%
1990	86	−0.97%
1999	84	−0.26%
2007	68	−2.61%
2012	125	+12.95%
2017	91	−6.15%
2023	88	−0.56%
Source: INSEE

== See also ==
- Communes of the Ardennes department
