= Joigny-sur-Meuse =

- Commune
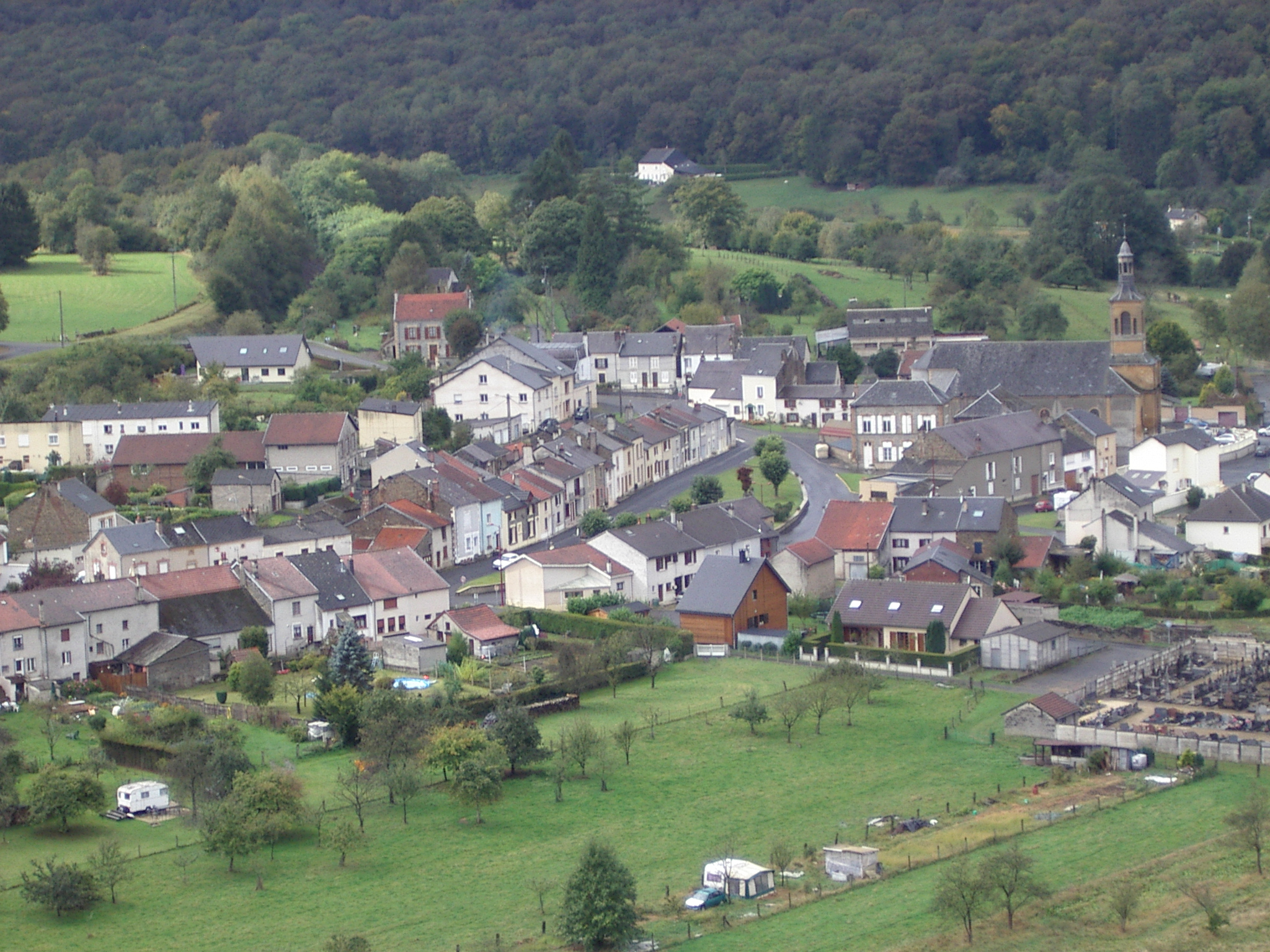
- A general view of Joigny-sur-Meuse

- Coat of arms
- Location of Joigny-sur-Meuse
- Location within France Location within Grand Est
- Coordinates: 49°50′18″N 4°45′41″E
- Country: France
- Region: Grand Est
- Department: Ardennes
- Arrondissement: Charleville-Mézières
- Canton: Bogny-sur-Meuse

Government
  - Mayor (2022–2026): Richard Depoix
- Area^{1}: 3.86 km^{2} (1.49 sq mi)
- Elevation: 148 m (486 ft)
- Population (2023): 627
  - Density: 162/km^{2} (421/sq mi)
- Time zone: UTC+01:00 (CET)
  - Summer (DST): UTC+02:00 (CEST)
- INSEE/Postal code: 08237 /08700
- ^{1} French Land Register data, which excludes lakes, ponds, glaciers > 1 km^{2} (0.386 sq mi or 247 acres) and river estuaries.

Joigny-sur-Meuse (French pronunciation: [ʒwaɲi syʁ møz], literally Joigny on Meuse, before 1959: Joigny) is a commune in the Ardennes department in northern France.

== Population ==
Historical population
Year	Pop.	±% p.a.
1968	604	—
1975	573	−0.75%
1982	687	+2.63%
1990	662	−0.46%
1999	634	−0.48%
2007	707	+1.37%
2012	707	+0.00%
2017	678	−0.83%
2023	627	−1.29%
Source: INSEE

== See also ==
- Communes of the Ardennes department
