= Thilay =

- Commune
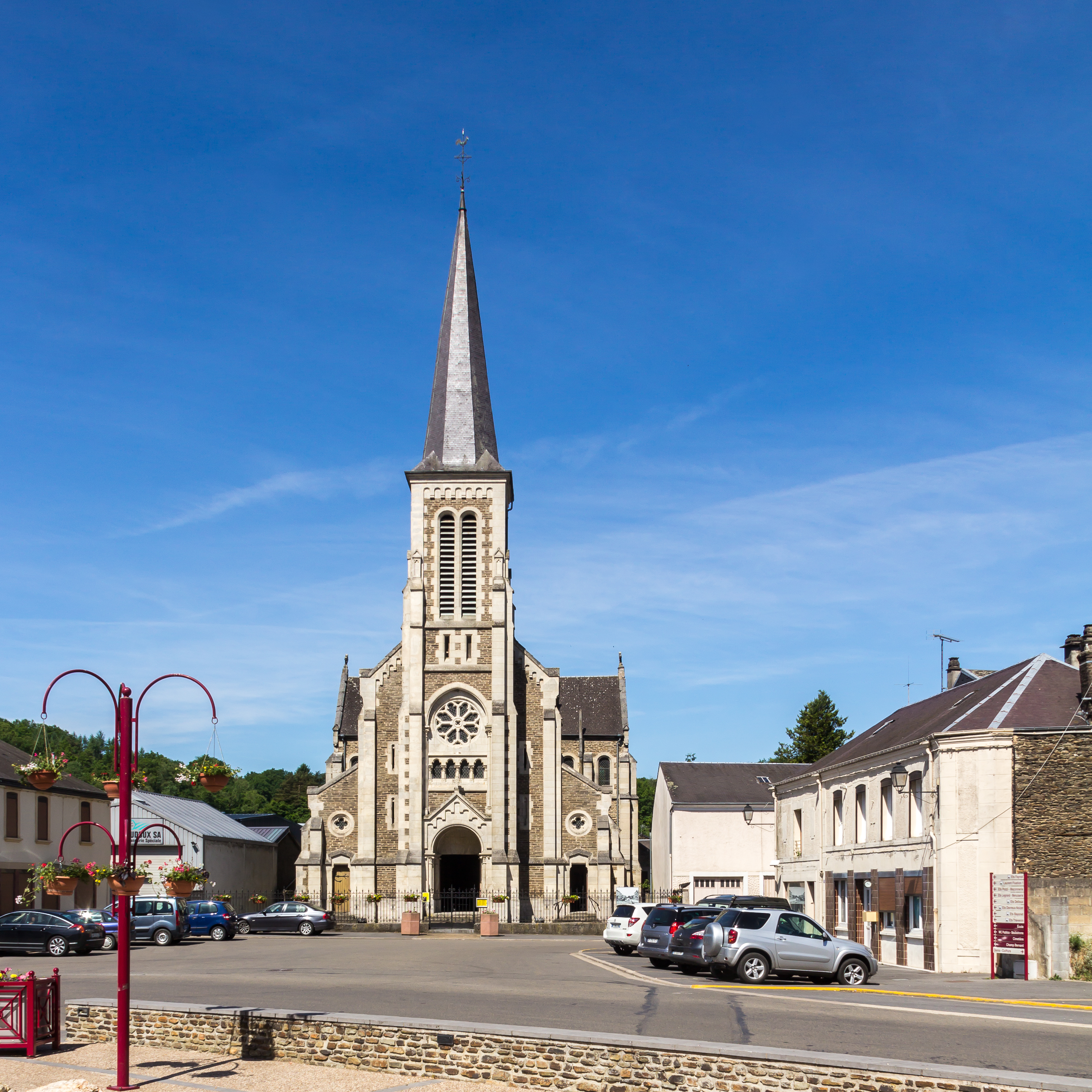
- The church in Thilay

- Coat of arms
- Location of Thilay
- Location within France Location within Grand Est
- Coordinates: 49°52′25″N 4°48′29″E
- Country: France
- Region: Grand Est
- Department: Ardennes
- Arrondissement: Charleville-Mézières
- Canton: Bogny-sur-Meuse

Government
  - Mayor (2020–2026): Nicole Jeannesson
- Area^{1}: 36.04 km^{2} (13.92 sq mi)
- Elevation: 375 m (1,230 ft)
- Highest elevation: 492 m (1,614 ft)
- Lowest elevation: 147 m (482 ft)
- Population (2023): 958
  - Density: 26.6/km^{2} (68.8/sq mi)
- Time zone: UTC+01:00 (CET)
  - Summer (DST): UTC+02:00 (CEST)
- INSEE/Postal code: 08448 /08800
- ^{1} French Land Register data, which excludes lakes, ponds, glaciers > 1 km^{2} (0.386 sq mi or 247 acres) and river estuaries.

Thilay (French pronunciation: [tilɛ]) is a commune in the Ardennes department in northern France.

== Population ==
Historical population
| Year | Pop. | ±% p.a. |
|---|---|---|
| 1968 | 1,245 | — |
| 1975 | 1,197 | −0.56% |
| 1982 | 1,151 | −0.56% |
| 1990 | 1,143 | −0.09% |
| 1999 | 1,093 | −0.50% |
| 2007 | 1,064 | −0.34% |
| 2012 | 1,067 | +0.06% |
| 2017 | 1,061 | −0.11% |
| 2023 | 958 | −1.69% |
Source: INSEE

== See also ==
- Communes of the Ardennes department
