= Deville, Ardennes =

Deville
- Commune
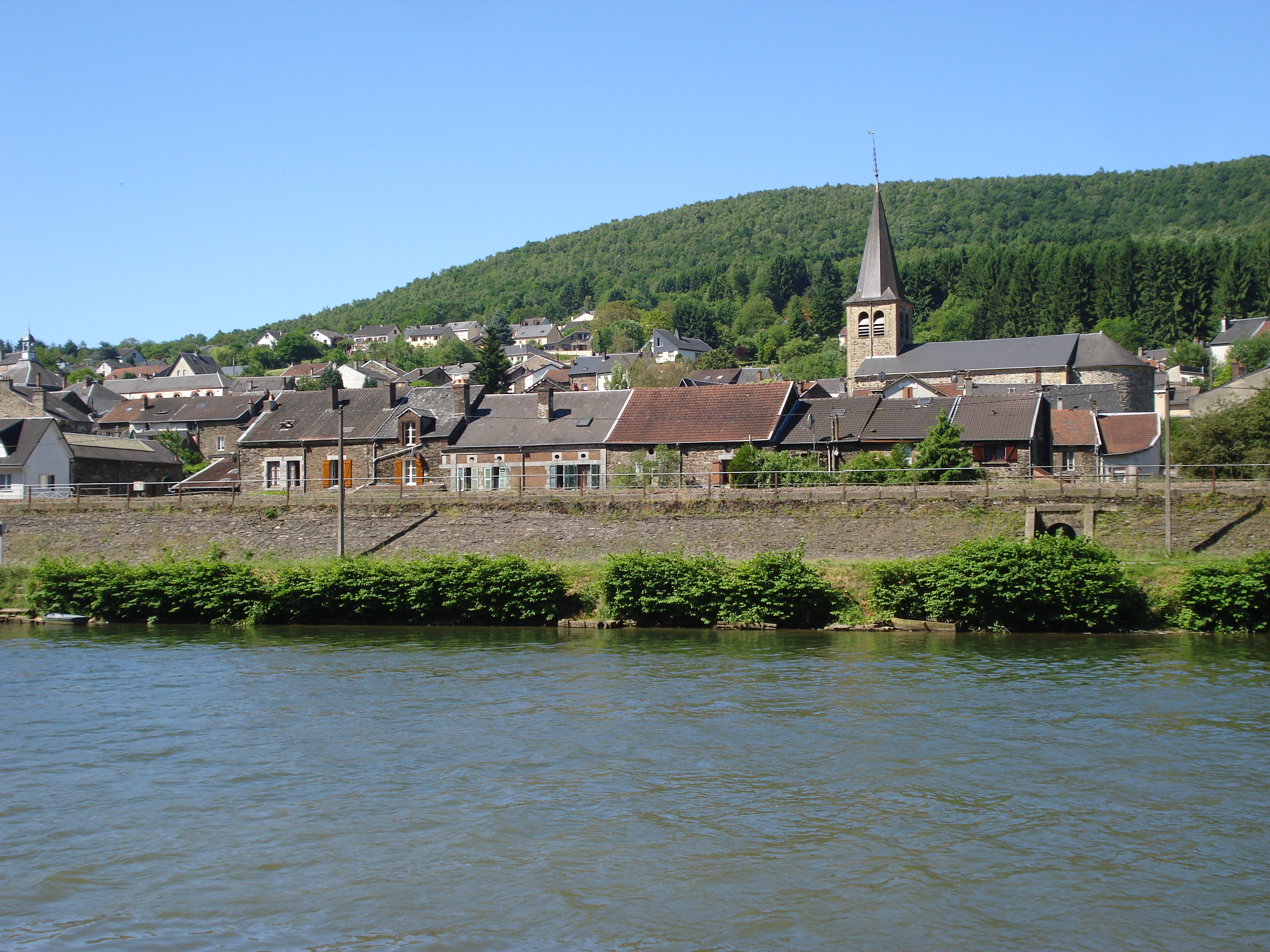
- A general view of Deville

- Coat of arms
- Location of Deville
- Location within France Location within Grand Est
- Coordinates: 49°52′54″N 4°42′23″E
- Country: France
- Region: Grand Est
- Department: Ardennes
- Arrondissement: Charleville-Mézières
- Canton: Bogny-sur-Meuse

Government
  - Mayor (2020–2026): Dominique Cosenza
- Area^{1}: 7.83 km^{2} (3.02 sq mi)
- Elevation: 160 m (520 ft)
- Highest elevation: 401 m (1,316 ft)
- Lowest elevation: 127 m (417 ft)
- Population (2023): 998
  - Density: 127/km^{2} (330/sq mi)
- Time zone: UTC+01:00 (CET)
  - Summer (DST): UTC+02:00 (CEST)
- INSEE/Postal code: 08139 /08800
- ^{1} French Land Register data, which excludes lakes, ponds, glaciers > 1 km^{2} (0.386 sq mi or 247 acres) and river estuaries.

Deville (French pronunciation: [dəvil]) is a commune in the Ardennes department and Grand Est region of north-eastern France.

== Population ==
Historical population
Year	Pop.	±% p.a.
1968	1,838	—
1975	1,773	−0.51%
1982	1,493	−2.43%
1990	1,301	−1.71%
1999	1,218	−0.73%
2007	1,164	−0.57%
2012	1,102	−1.09%
2017	1,041	−1.13%
2023	998	−0.70%
Source: INSEE

== See also ==
- Communes of the Ardennes department
