= Laifour =

- Commune
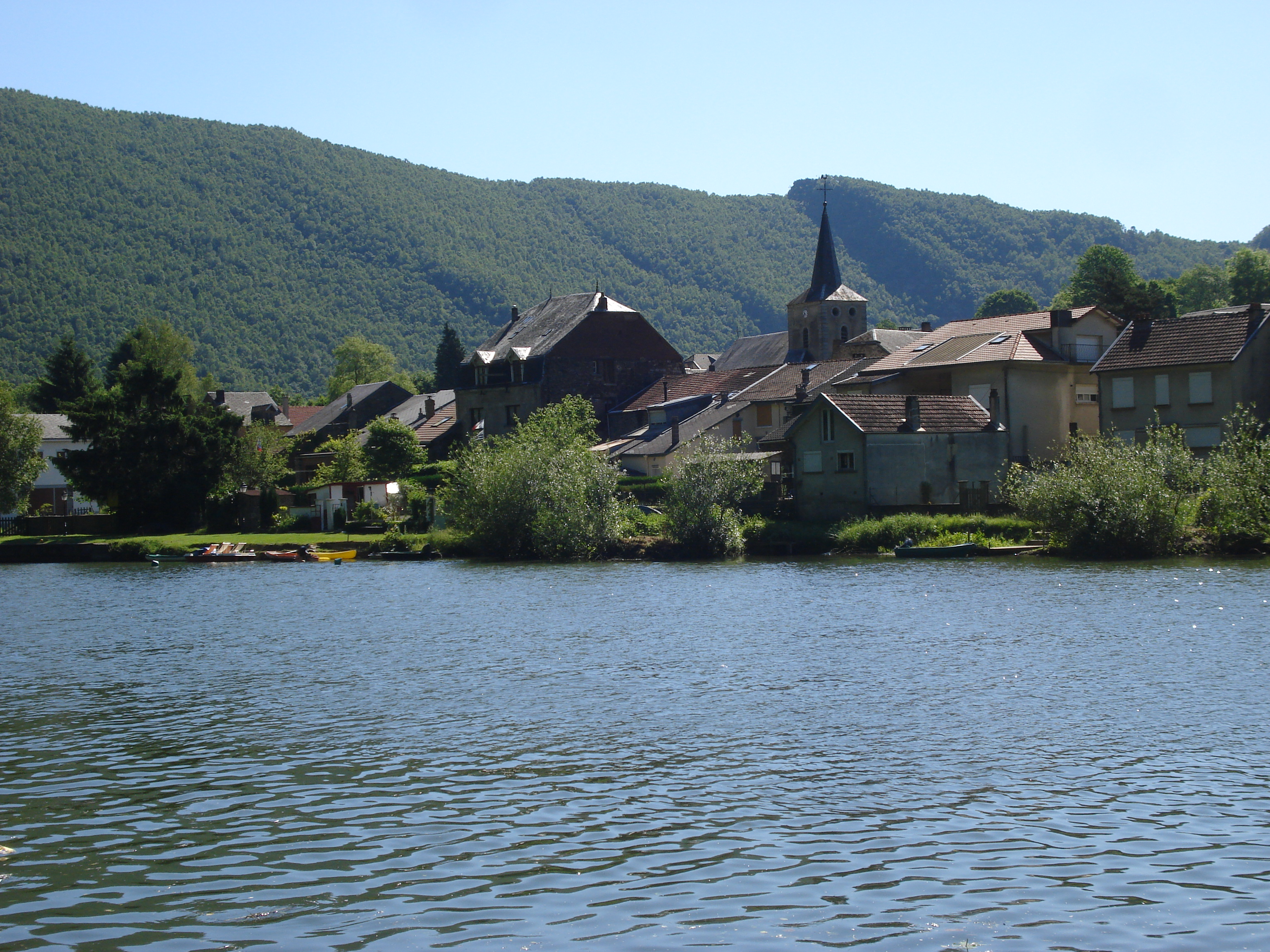
- A general view of Laifour
- Location of Laifour
- Location within France Location within Grand Est
- Coordinates: 49°54′48″N 4°41′37″E
- Country: France
- Region: Grand Est
- Department: Ardennes
- Arrondissement: Charleville-Mézières
- Canton: Bogny-sur-Meuse

Government
  - Mayor (2020–2026): Jean-Marie Gardellin
- Area^{1}: 3.25 km^{2} (1.25 sq mi)
- Elevation: 145 m (476 ft)
- Population (2023): 399
  - Density: 123/km^{2} (318/sq mi)
- Time zone: UTC+01:00 (CET)
  - Summer (DST): UTC+02:00 (CEST)
- INSEE/Postal code: 08242 /08800
- ^{1} French Land Register data, which excludes lakes, ponds, glaciers > 1 km^{2} (0.386 sq mi or 247 acres) and river estuaries.

Laifour (French pronunciation: [lɛfuʁ]) is a commune in the Ardennes department in northern France. It is situated on the river Meuse. Laifour station has rail connections to Charleville-Mézières and Givet.

== Population ==
Historical population
| Year | Pop. | ±% p.a. |
|---|---|---|
| 1968 | 768 | — |
| 1975 | 757 | −0.21% |
| 1982 | 691 | −1.29% |
| 1990 | 584 | −2.08% |
| 1999 | 568 | −0.31% |
| 2007 | 514 | −1.24% |
| 2012 | 498 | −0.63% |
| 2017 | 449 | −2.05% |
| 2023 | 399 | −1.95% |
Source: INSEE

== See also ==
- Communes of the Ardennes department
