= Tournavaux =

- Commune
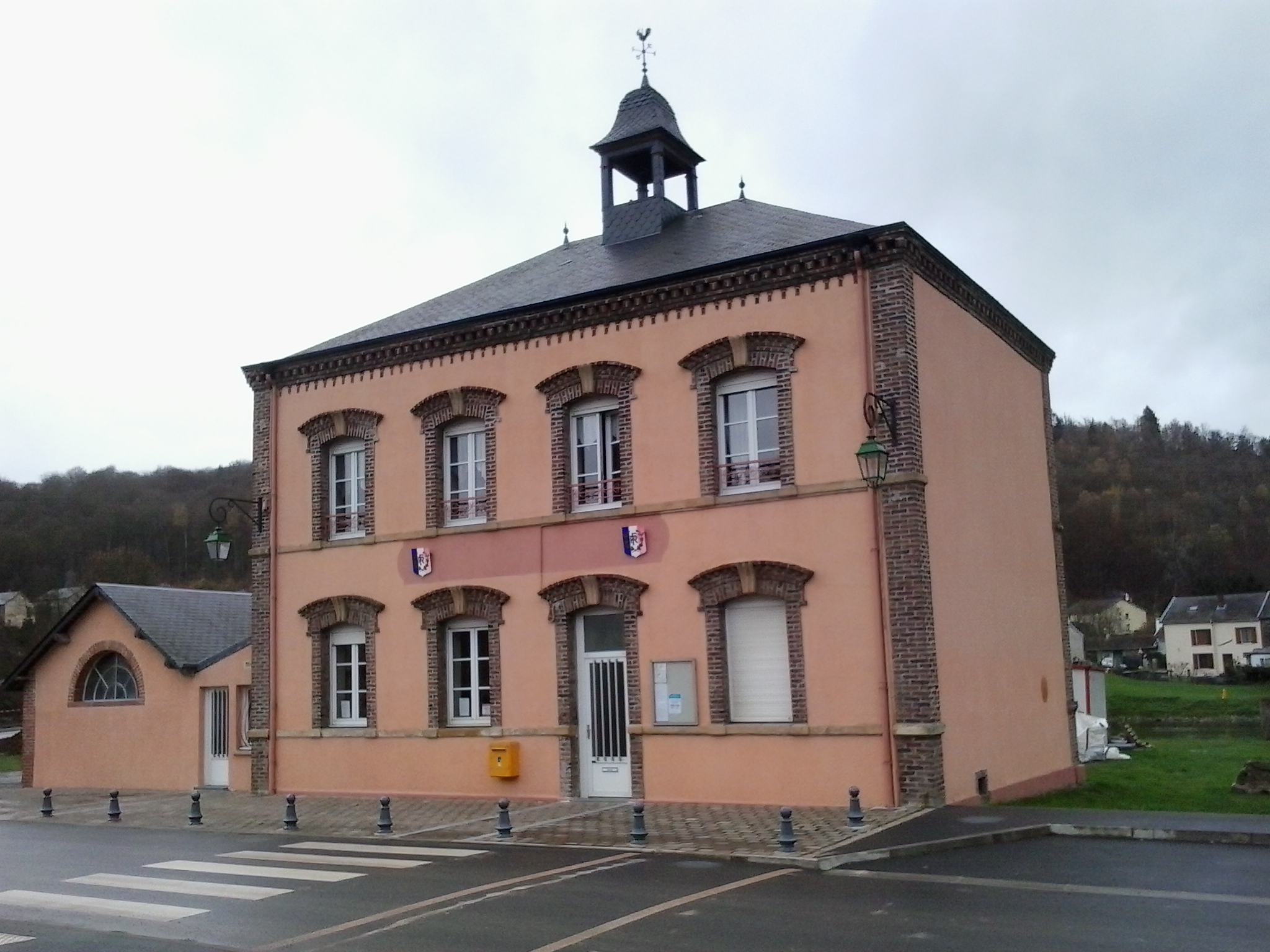
- The town hall in Tournavaux

- Coat of arms
- Location of Tournavaux
- Location within France Location within Grand Est
- Coordinates: 49°52′25″N 4°47′14″E
- Country: France
- Region: Grand Est
- Department: Ardennes
- Arrondissement: Charleville-Mézières
- Canton: Bogny-sur-Meuse

Government
  - Mayor (2020–2026): Luc Lallouette
- Area^{1}: 1.55 km^{2} (0.60 sq mi)
- Elevation: 164 m (538 ft)
- Population (2023): 234
  - Density: 151/km^{2} (391/sq mi)
- Time zone: UTC+01:00 (CET)
  - Summer (DST): UTC+02:00 (CEST)
- INSEE/Postal code: 08456 /08800
- ^{1} French Land Register data, which excludes lakes, ponds, glaciers > 1 km^{2} (0.386 sq mi or 247 acres) and river estuaries.

Tournavaux (French pronunciation: [tuʁnavo]) is a commune in the Ardennes department in northern France.

== Population ==
Historical population
Year	Pop.	±% p.a.
1968	133	—
1975	120	−1.46%
1982	128	+0.93%
1990	120	−0.80%
1999	147	+2.28%
2007	163	+1.30%
2012	179	+1.89%
2017	241	+6.13%
2023	234	−0.49%
Source: INSEE

== See also ==
- Communes of the Ardennes department
