= Monthermé =

- Commune
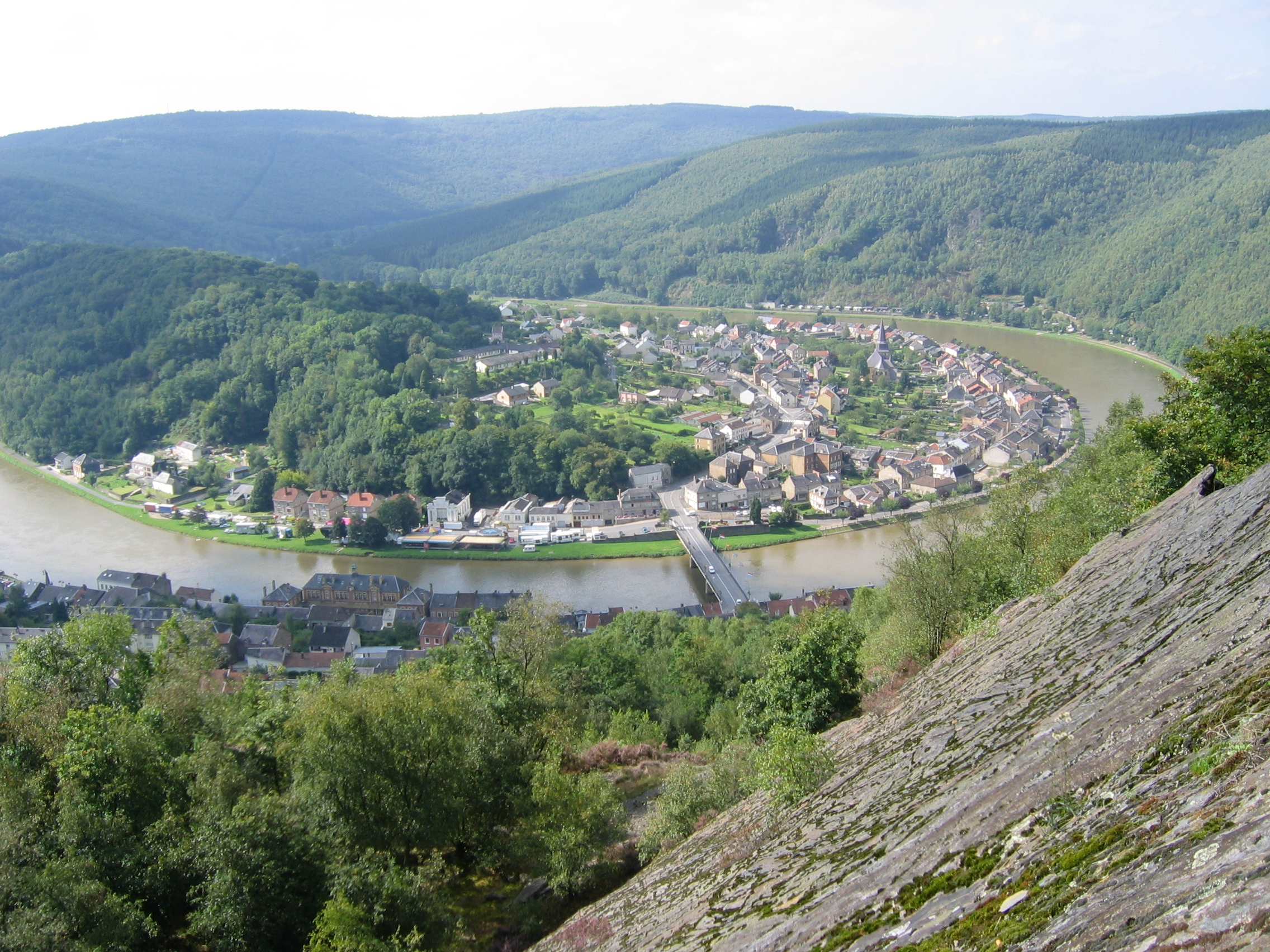
- A general view of Monthermé

- Coat of arms
- Location of Monthermé
- Location within France Location within Grand Est
- Coordinates: 49°53′06″N 4°44′21″E
- Country: France
- Region: Grand Est
- Department: Ardennes
- Arrondissement: Charleville-Mézières
- Canton: Bogny-sur-Meuse
- Intercommunality: Vallées et Plateau d'Ardenne

Government
  - Mayor (2020–2026): Catherine Joly
- Area^{1}: 32.33 km^{2} (12.48 sq mi)
- Elevation: 156 m (512 ft)
- Population (2023): 2,138
  - Density: 66.13/km^{2} (171.3/sq mi)
- Time zone: UTC+01:00 (CET)
  - Summer (DST): UTC+02:00 (CEST)
- INSEE/Postal code: 08302 /08800
- ^{1} French Land Register data, which excludes lakes, ponds, glaciers > 1 km^{2} (0.386 sq mi or 247 acres) and river estuaries.

Monthermé (French pronunciation: [mɔ̃tɛʁme]) is a commune in the Ardennes department in northern France.

== Geography ==
The river Semois (or Semoy) joins the river Meuse in Monthermé.

== Population ==
Historical population

Year	Pop.	±% p.a.
1793	1,520	—
1800	1,396	−1.21%
1806	1,425	+0.34%
1821	1,379	−0.22%
1831	1,660	+1.87%
1836	1,620	−0.49%
1841	1,976	+4.05%
1846	2,126	+1.47%
1851	2,299	+1.58%
1866	2,550	+0.69%
1872	2,599	+0.32%
1876	3,024	+3.86%
1881	3,383	+2.27%
1886	3,699	+1.80%
1891	3,870	+0.91%
1896	4,150	+1.41%
1901	4,272	+0.58%
1906	4,170	−0.48%

Year	Pop.	±% p.a.
1911	4,456	+1.34%
1921	3,621	−2.05%
1926	3,842	+1.19%
1931	3,889	+0.24%
1936	3,705	−0.96%
1946	3,018	−2.03%
1954	3,468	+1.75%
1962	3,589	+0.43%
1968	3,212	−1.83%
1975	3,299	+0.38%
1982	3,103	−0.87%
1990	2,866	−0.99%
1999	2,791	−0.29%
2007	2,533	−1.21%
2012	2,423	−0.88%
2017	2,335	−0.74%
2023	2,138	−1.46%

Source: EHESS and INSEE (1968–2023)

== See also ==
- Communes of the Ardennes department
