= Bourg-Fidèle =

- Commune
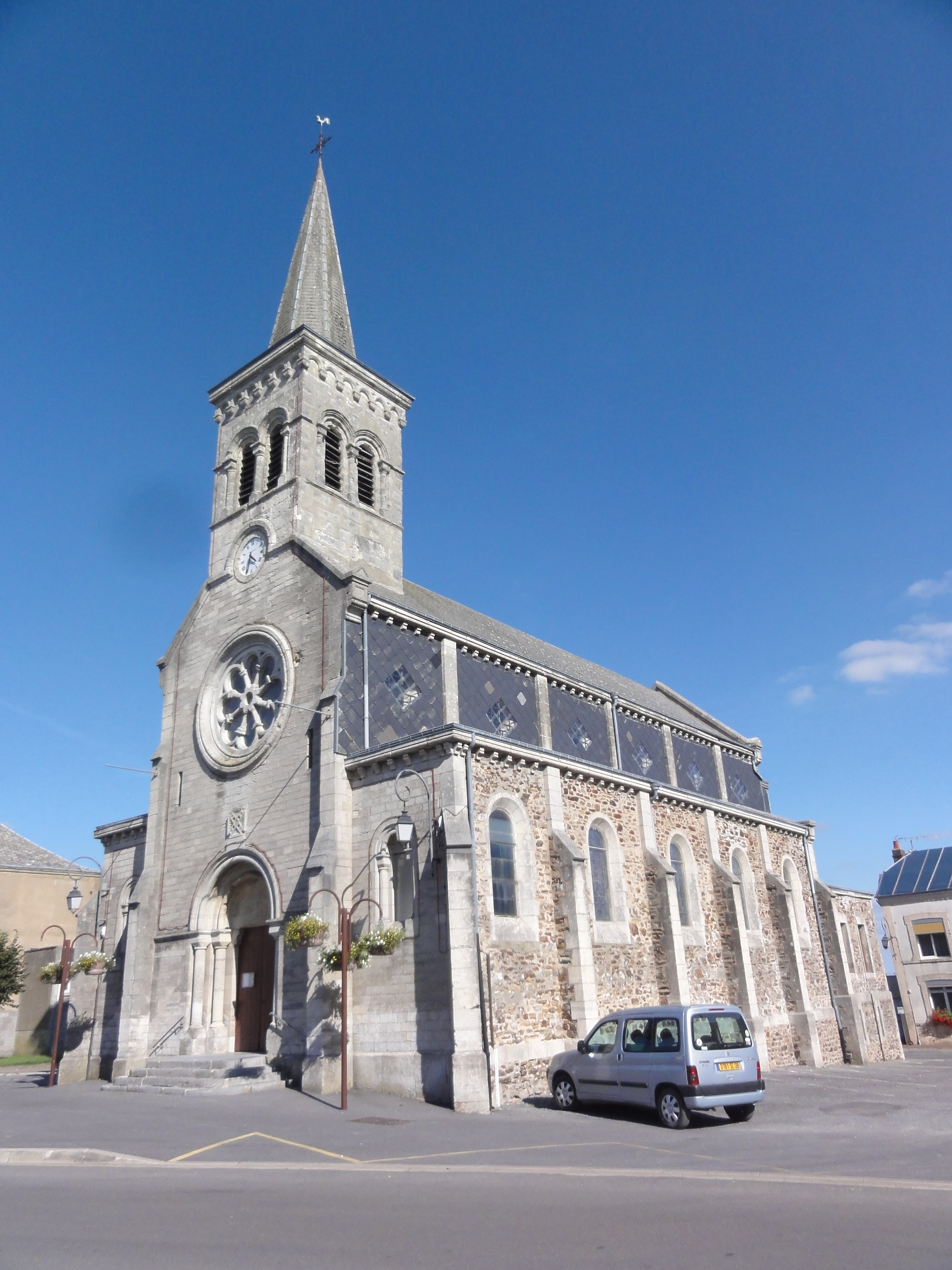
- The church in Bourg-Fidèle

- Coat of arms
- Location of Bourg-Fidèle
- Location within France Location within Grand Est
- Coordinates: 49°53′31″N 4°32′30″E
- Country: France
- Region: Grand Est
- Department: Ardennes
- Arrondissement: Charleville-Mézières
- Canton: Rocroi

Government
  - Mayor (2020–2026): Eric Andry
- Area^{1}: 14.79 km^{2} (5.71 sq mi)
- Elevation: 375 m (1,230 ft)
- Highest elevation: 381 m (1,250 ft)
- Lowest elevation: 200 m (660 ft)
- Population (2023): 818
  - Density: 55.3/km^{2} (143/sq mi)
- Time zone: UTC+01:00 (CET)
  - Summer (DST): UTC+02:00 (CEST)
- INSEE/Postal code: 08078 /08230
- ^{1} French Land Register data, which excludes lakes, ponds, glaciers > 1 km^{2} (0.386 sq mi or 247 acres) and river estuaries.

Bourg-Fidèle (French pronunciation: [buʁ fidɛl]) is a commune in the Ardennes department in northern France.

== Population ==
Historical population
Year	Pop.	±% p.a.
1968	778	—
1975	663	−2.26%
1982	700	+0.78%
1990	732	+0.56%
1999	771	+0.58%
2007	823	+0.82%
2012	871	+1.14%
2017	862	−0.21%
2023	818	−0.87%
Source: INSEE

== See also ==
- Communes of the Ardennes department
