= Canton of Bogny-sur-Meuse =

Coordinates: 49.85°N 4.76°E

- Canton
- Situation of the canton of Bogny-sur-Meuse in the department of Ardennes
- Country: France
- Region: Grand Est
- Department: Ardennes
- No. of communes: {{{nbcomm}}}
- Population (2023): 14,372
- INSEE code: 0802

The canton of Bogny-sur-Meuse is an administrative division of the Ardennes department, northern France. It was created at the French canton reorganisation which came into effect in March 2015. Its seat is in Bogny-sur-Meuse.

It consists of the following communes:

1. Bogny-sur-Meuse
2. Deville
3. Haulmé
4. Les Hautes-Rivières
5. Joigny-sur-Meuse
6. Laifour
7. Les Mazures
8. Montcornet
9. Monthermé
10. Renwez
11. Thilay
12. Tournavaux
