= Givet station =

French railway station

Coordinates: 50°08′25″N 4°49′6″E

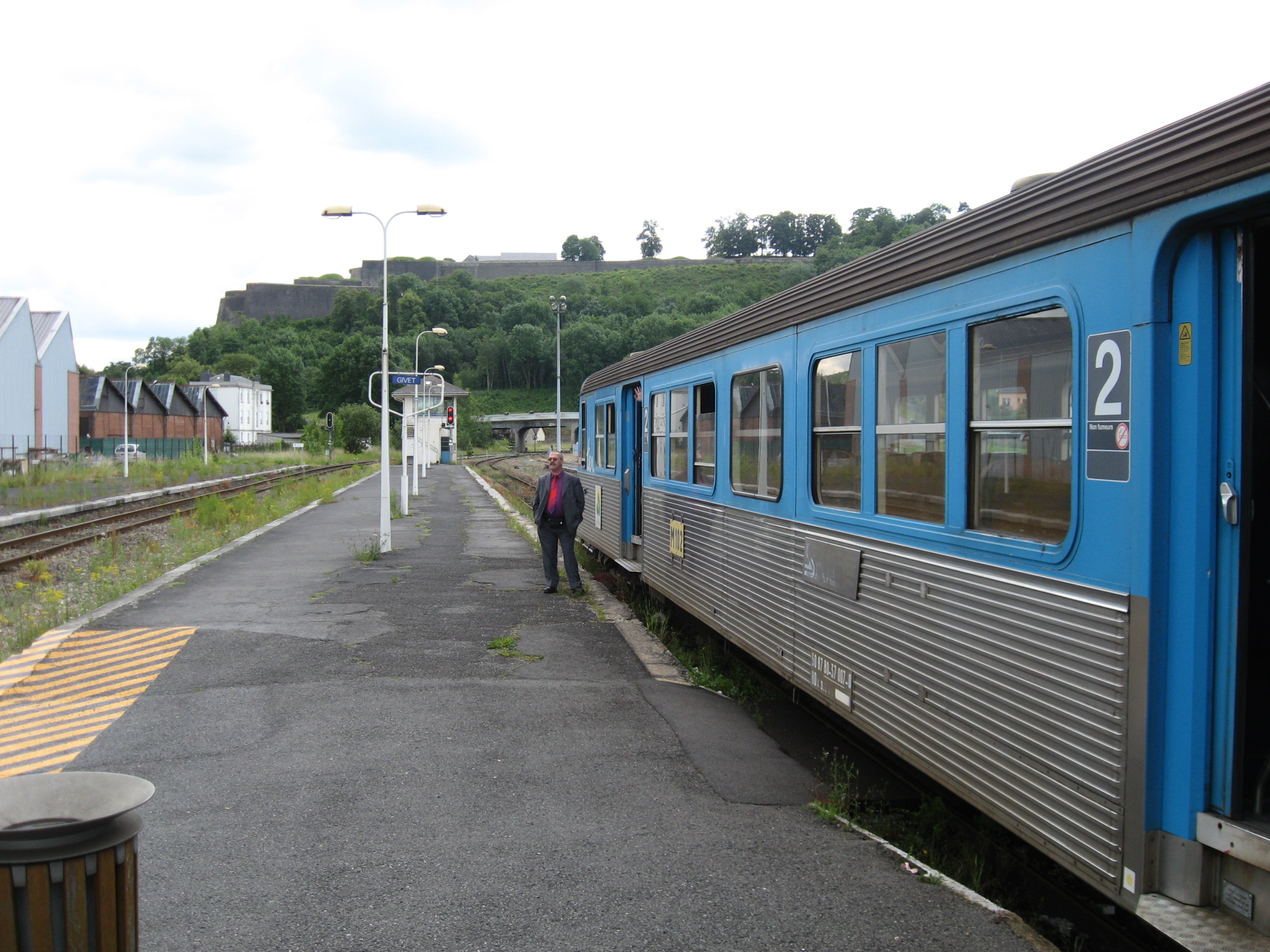

Givet station (French: Gare de Givet) is a French railway station serving the town Givet, Ardennes department in northeastern France. It is the terminus of the Soissons–Givet railway. The station is served by regional trains towards Charleville-Mézières. The line towards Dinant in Belgium was closed for passenger traffic in 1988.

Preceding station	TER Grand Est	Following station
Terminus	C07	Aubrives towards Charleville-Mézières

== See also ==
- List of SNCF stations in Grand Est
