= Les Hautes-Rivières =

- Commune
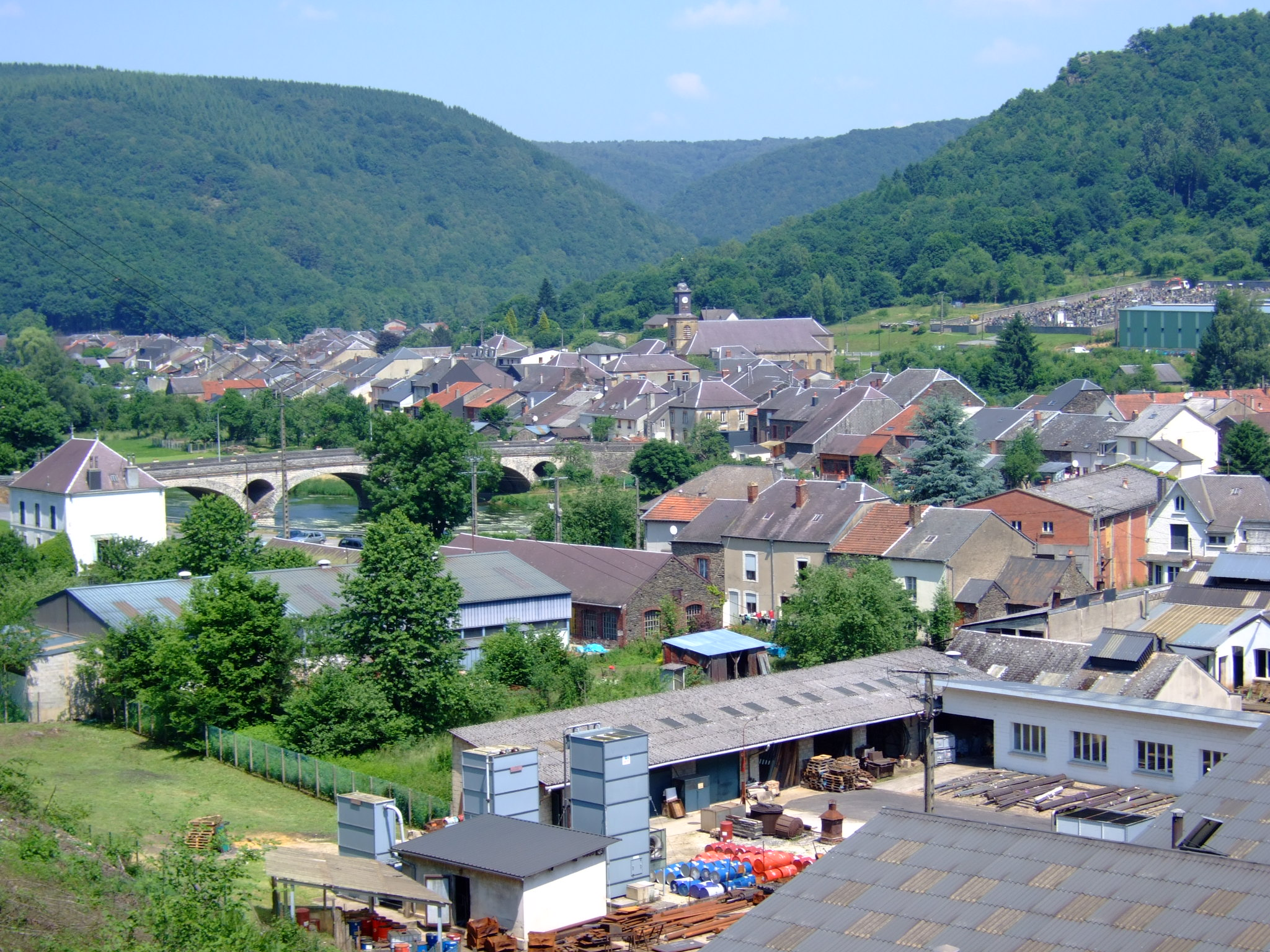
- A general view of Les Hautes-Rivières

- Coat of arms
- Location of Les Hautes-Rivières
- Location within France Location within Grand Est
- Coordinates: 49°53′04″N 4°50′34″E
- Country: France
- Region: Grand Est
- Department: Ardennes
- Arrondissement: Charleville-Mézières
- Canton: Bogny-sur-Meuse
- Intercommunality: Vallées et Plateau d'Ardenne

Government
  - Mayor (2020–2026): Denis Disy
- Area^{1}: 31.34 km^{2} (12.10 sq mi)
- Elevation: 185 m (607 ft)
- Highest elevation: 501 m (1,644 ft)
- Lowest elevation: 157 m (515 ft)
- Population (2023): 1,239
  - Density: 39.53/km^{2} (102.4/sq mi)
- Time zone: UTC+01:00 (CET)
  - Summer (DST): UTC+02:00 (CEST)
- INSEE/Postal code: 08218 /08800
- ^{1} French Land Register data, which excludes lakes, ponds, glaciers > 1 km^{2} (0.386 sq mi or 247 acres) and river estuaries.

Les Hautes-Rivières (French pronunciation: [le ot ʁivjɛʁ]) is a commune in the Ardennes department in northern France. It lies on both banks of the river Semois, on the border with Belgium.

== Population ==
Historical population
Year	Pop.	±% p.a.
1968	2,091	—
1975	2,320	+1.50%
1982	2,354	+0.21%
1990	2,077	−1.55%
1999	1,949	−0.70%
2007	1,767	−1.22%
2012	1,587	−2.13%
2017	1,482	−1.36%
2023	1,239	−2.94%
Source: INSEE

== See also ==
- Communes of the Ardennes department
