= Sedan station =

French railway station

Sedan
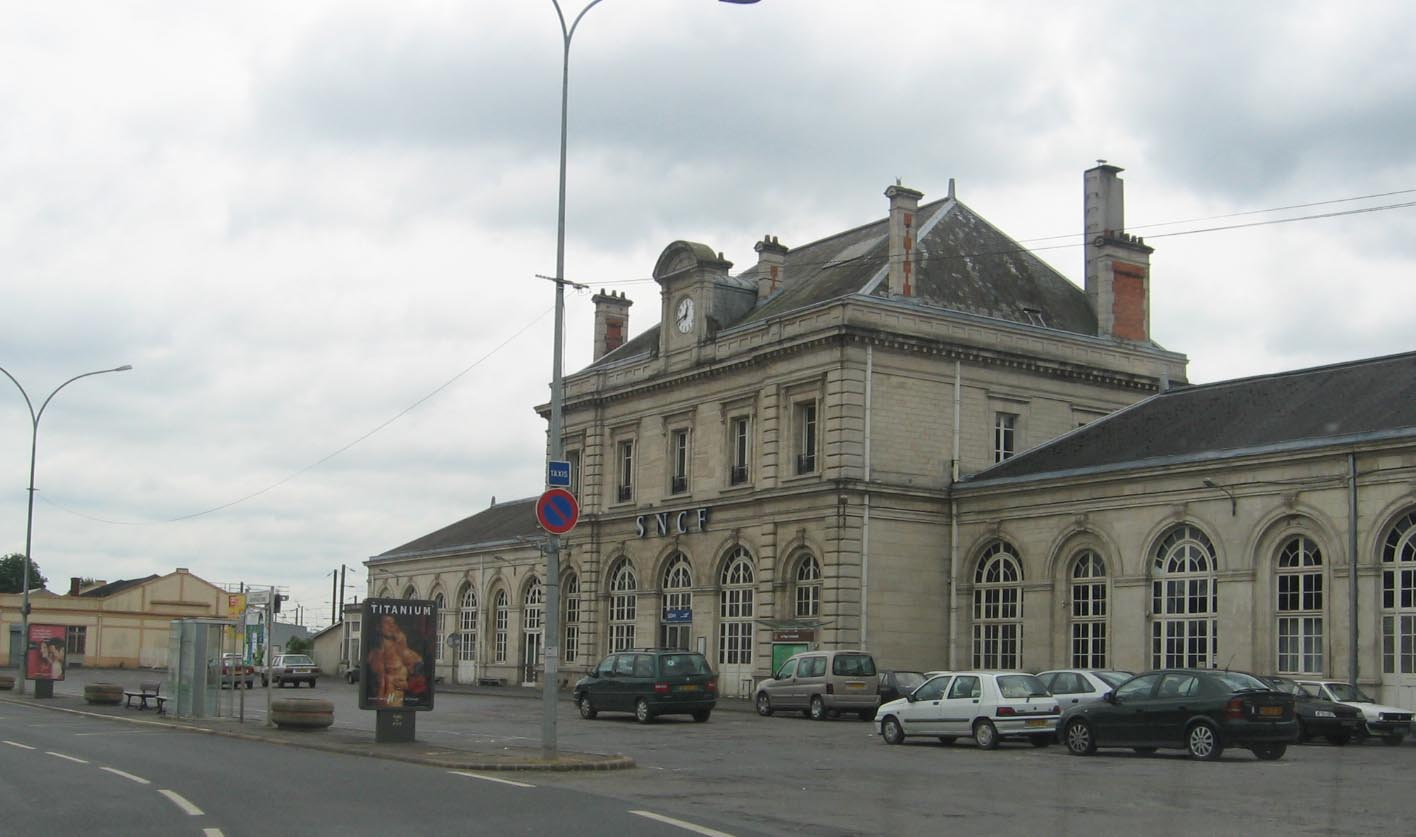

General information
- Location: Place de la Gare; Sedan, France
- Coordinates: 49°41′42″N 4°55′48″E
- Owner: SNCF
- Platforms: 2
- Tracks: 3

History
- Opened: May 17, 1859

Services
Preceding station	SNCF	Following station
Charleville-Mézières towards Paris-Est	TGV inOui	Terminus
Preceding station	TER Grand Est	Following station
Donchery towards Champagne-Ardenne TGV	C01	Terminus
Charleville-Mézières Terminus	C08	Carignan towards Longwy
Location

Sedan station (French: Gare de Sedan) is a railway station serving the town of Sedan, Ardennes department in northeastern France. It is situated on the Mohon–Thionville railway. The station is served by regional trains towards Charleville-Mézières, Reims and Longwy, and by high-speed trains towards Paris.

== See also ==
- List of SNCF stations in Grand Est
