= Les Mazures =

- Commune
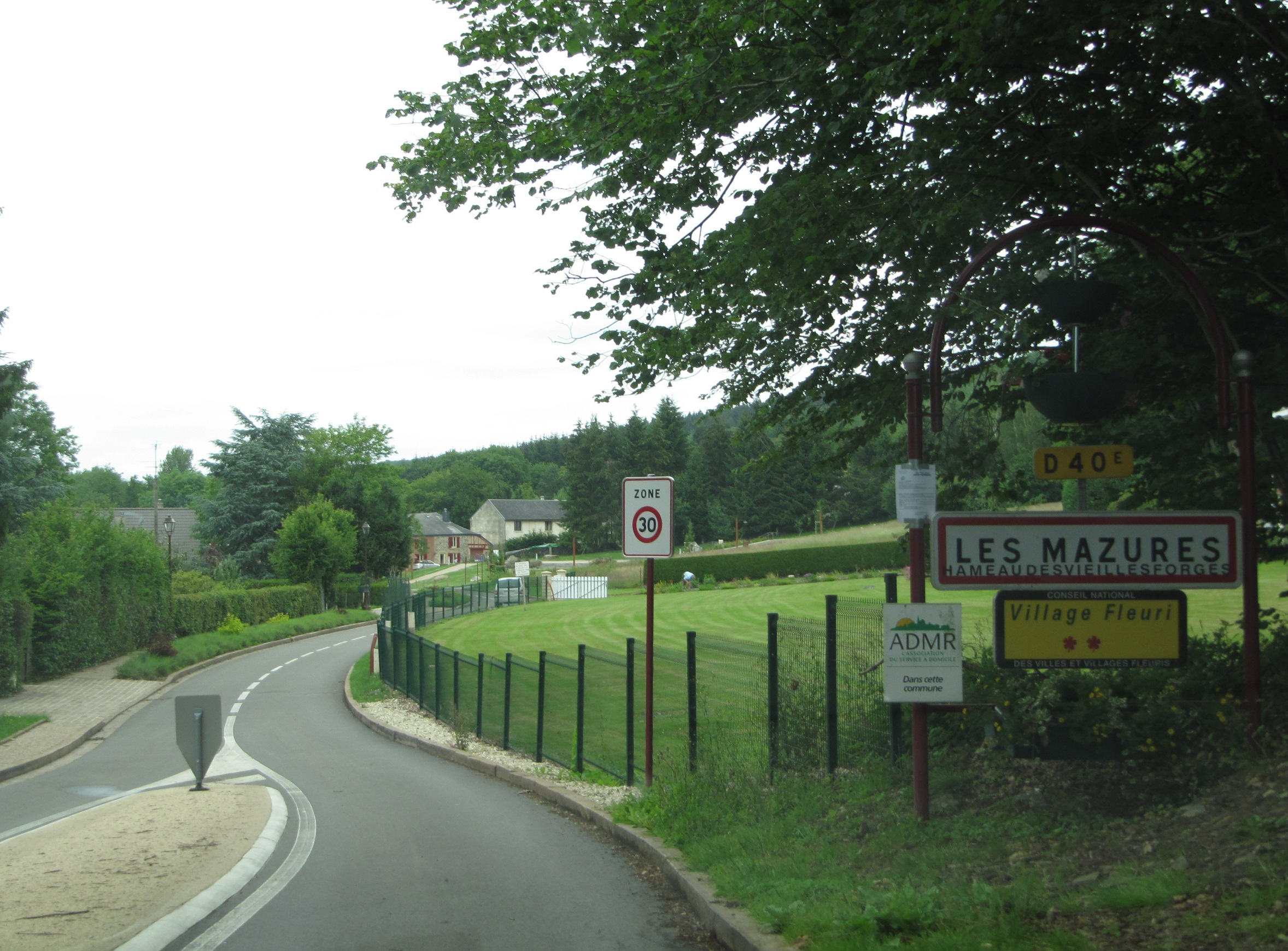
- The road into Les Mazures
- Location of Les Mazures
- Location within France Location within Grand Est
- Coordinates: 49°53′19″N 4°37′38″E
- Country: France
- Region: Grand Est
- Department: Ardennes
- Arrondissement: Charleville-Mézières
- Canton: Bogny-sur-Meuse

Government
  - Mayor (2020–2026): Elisabeth Bonillo-Deram
- Area^{1}: 36.14 km^{2} (13.95 sq mi)
- Elevation: 376 m (1,234 ft)
- Population (2023): 846
  - Density: 23.4/km^{2} (60.6/sq mi)
- Time zone: UTC+01:00 (CET)
  - Summer (DST): UTC+02:00 (CEST)
- INSEE/Postal code: 08284 /08500
- ^{1} French Land Register data, which excludes lakes, ponds, glaciers > 1 km^{2} (0.386 sq mi or 247 acres) and river estuaries.

Les Mazures (French pronunciation: [le mazyʁ]) is a commune in the Ardennes department in northern France.

During the Second World War, Les Mazures was the site of a forced labour camp, used by the Nazis for the detainment of Jews and French prisoners of war of North African origin. 288 Jewish men from Antwerp were imprisoned in Les Mazures in July 1942. In October 1942 and January 1944, most of them were deported to Auschwitz, where 239 of them were assassinated.

== Population ==
Historical population
| Year | Pop. | ±% p.a. |
|---|---|---|
| 1968 | 922 | — |
| 1975 | 789 | −2.20% |
| 1982 | 781 | −0.15% |
| 1990 | 738 | −0.71% |
| 1999 | 774 | +0.53% |
| 2007 | 928 | +2.29% |
| 2012 | 940 | +0.26% |
| 2017 | 903 | −0.80% |
| 2023 | 846 | −1.08% |
Source: INSEE

== See also ==
- Communes of the Ardennes department
