= Établissement public territorial de bassin =

French water management entity

A Établissement public territorial de bassin, (Territorial basin public establishment or EPTB) is a French public entity responsible for the territorial planning and management of rivers and major watercourses within the geographical scope of a river basin or sub-basin. EPTBs operate as mixed syndicates or interdepartmental institutions, funded by the member local authorities.

== History and legal framework ==
The concept of EPTBs emerged in the late 20th century as part of France's efforts to enhance watershed-level water governance. The term was first formalized in 1997 by the Syndicat Mixte d'Études et d'Aménagement de la Garonne (SMEAG) for the Garonne River basin. The legal foundation for EPTBs was established under Article 46 of Law No. 2003-699 of 30 July 2003, which focused on the prevention of technological and natural risks and the remediation of damages.

Further legal reinforcement came with the Grenelle II Law (Law No. 2010-788) of 12 July 2010, which emphasized sustainable development and environmental protection. This legislation expanded the responsibilities of EPTBs, particularly in implementing water development and management plans (Schémas d’Aménagement et de Gestion des Eaux, or SAGE) under specific conditions.

== Responsibilities ==
EPTBs have authority in three main areas:

- Hydraulics: Managing low water levels, preventing floods, and ensuring drinking water production.
- Environment: Supporting migratory fish, maintaining riverbanks, and protecting ecosystems.
- Local development: Promoting natural and cultural heritage.

EPTBs operate across territories that often span multiple departments, regions, or even countries, fostering solidarity and acting as key players in territorial planning.

The Grenelle II Law of 2010 clarified that EPTBs implement the Schéma directeur d'aménagement et de gestion des eaux (SAGE) under specific conditions, such as recognition through the decree of 7 February 2005 or when the SAGE perimeter aligns with the EPTB’s jurisdiction without overlapping other local authority groupings.

== List of EPTBs ==
As of 2023, France has established 42 EPTBs, each overseeing specific river basins or sub-basins. Notable examples include: (Note: A full list is available from the Association Nationale des Élus des Bassins.)

- EPTB Seine Grands Lacs – Manages reservoirs and flood prevention infrastructure in the Seine basin.
- EPTB Dordogne – Coordinates water management efforts in the Dordogne River basin.
- EPTB Loire – Oversees the Loire River basin, focusing on flood prevention and ecological preservation.

== See also ==
- Schéma directeur d'aménagement et de gestion des eaux
- Water resource management
- River management

== Bibliography ==
- Drobenko, Bernard (2008). L'essentiel du droit de l'eau : À jour de la loi sur l'eau et les milieux aquatiques et de ses décrets d'application [The essentials of water law: Up to date with the law on water and aquatic environments and its implementing decrees] (in French). Paris: Gualino Éditeur. ISBN 9782297003902.
- Gazzaniga, Jean-Louis; Ourliac, Jean-Paul (1979). Le droit de l'eau [The Water Law]. Paris: Librairies techniques. p. 247. ISBN 978-2711101979.
