= Charleville-Mézières station =

French railway station

Coordinates: 49°46′4″N 4°43′30″E

Charleville-Mézières
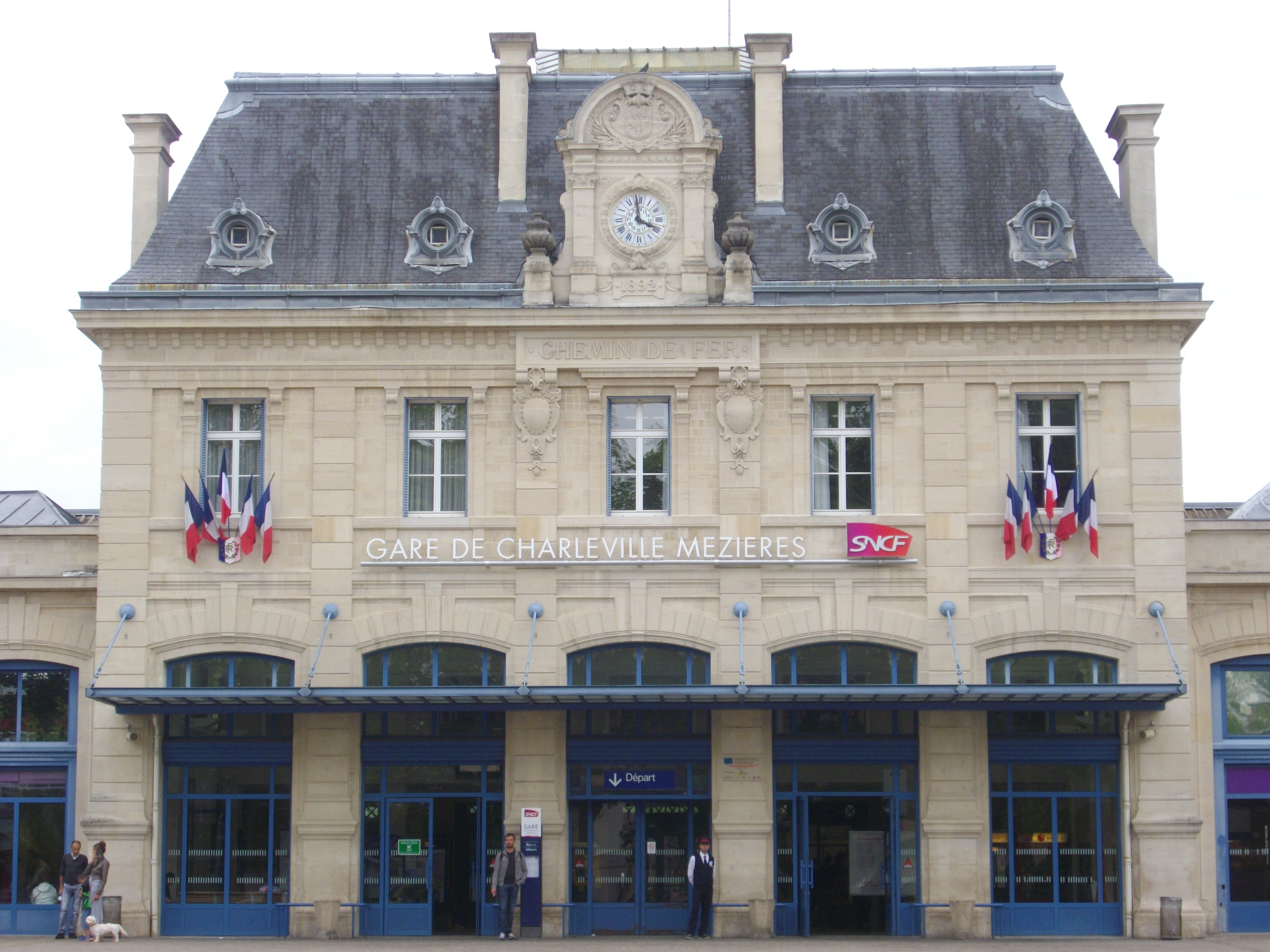

General information
- Location: Place de la Gare; 08000 Charleville-Mézières; Ardennes; France
- Elevation: 148 m (486 ft)
- Owner: SNCF
- Operator: SNCF
- Platforms: 5
- Tracks: 5

History
- Opened: 15 September 1858

Passengers
- 2024: 1,500,456
Location

Charleville-Mézières station (French: Gare de Charleville-Mézières) is a French railway station serving the town Charleville-Mézières, Ardennes department, northeastern France. TGV trains run to Paris as well as regular local services to Reims. Prior to the opening of the LGV Est between Paris and Strasbourg in 2007, two trains a day used to run in each direction between Gare de Lille Flandres and the Gare de Metz-Ville.

== Services ==
The following train services serve the station as of 2017:

Preceding station	SNCF	Following station
Rethel towards Paris-Est	TGV inOui	Sedan Terminus
Preceding station	TER Hauts-de-France	Following station
Liart towards Lille-Flandres	Krono K61	Terminus
Preceding station	TER Grand Est	Following station
Poix-Terron towards Champagne-Ardenne TGV	C01	Mohon towards Sedan
Nouzonville towards Givet	C07	Terminus
Terminus	C08	Sedan towards Longwy

== See also ==
- List of SNCF stations in Grand Est
- Jet Lag: The Game
