= Renwez =

- Commune
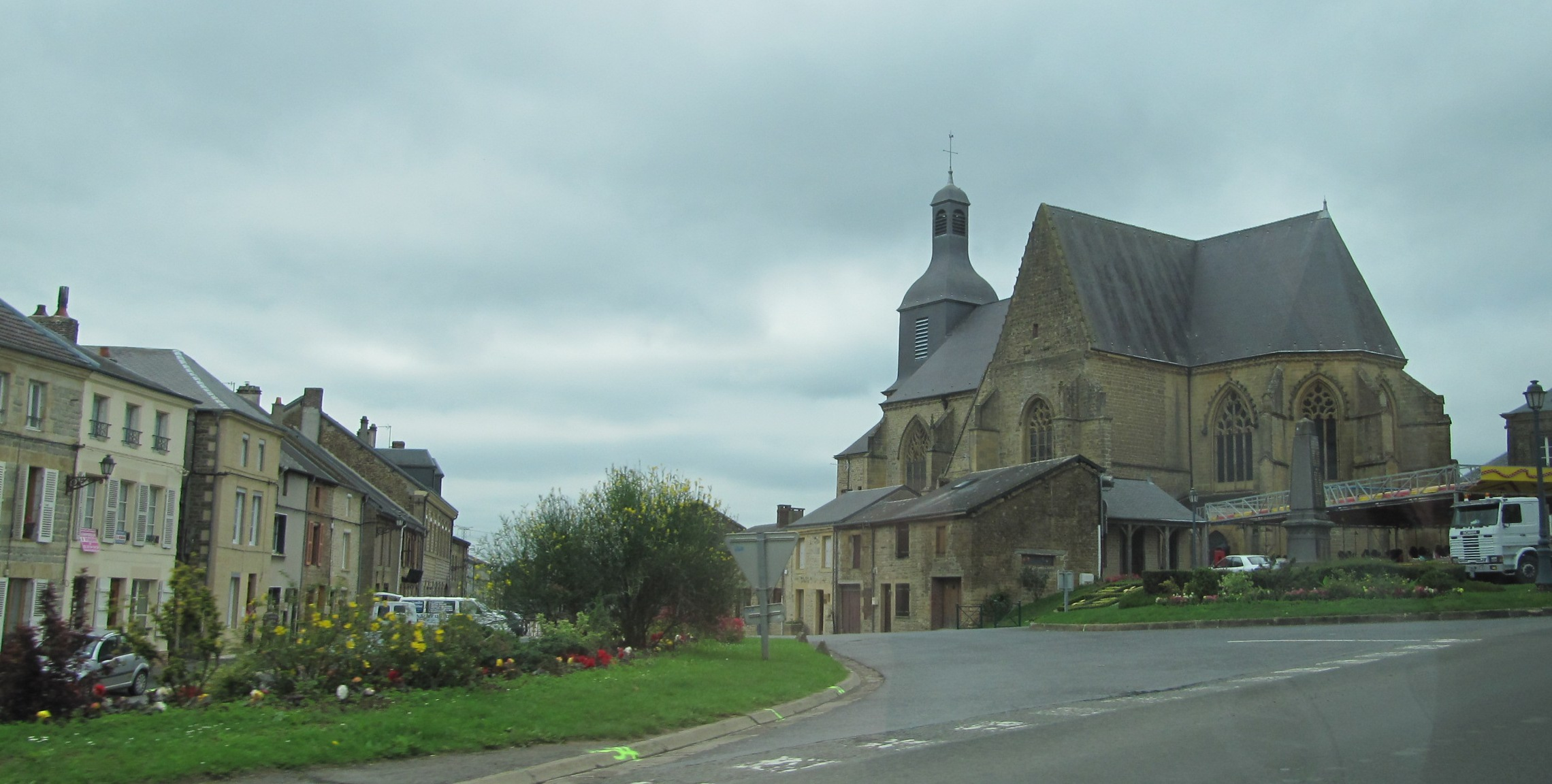
- The church and surroundings in Renwez

- Coat of arms
- Location of Renwez
- Location within France Location within Grand Est
- Coordinates: 49°50′25″N 4°36′10″E
- Country: France
- Region: Grand Est
- Department: Ardennes
- Arrondissement: Charleville-Mézières
- Canton: Bogny-sur-Meuse
- Intercommunality: Vallées et Plateau d'Ardenne

Government
  - Mayor (2020–2026): Annie Jacquet-Ferro
- Area^{1}: 16.18 km^{2} (6.25 sq mi)
- Elevation: 284 m (932 ft)
- Population (2023): 1,656
  - Density: 102.3/km^{2} (265.1/sq mi)
- Time zone: UTC+01:00 (CET)
  - Summer (DST): UTC+02:00 (CEST)
- INSEE/Postal code: 08361 /08150
- ^{1} French Land Register data, which excludes lakes, ponds, glaciers > 1 km^{2} (0.386 sq mi or 247 acres) and river estuaries.

Renwez (French pronunciation: [ʁɑ̃ve]) is a commune in the Ardennes department in northern France.

== Population ==
Historical population
Year	Pop.	±% p.a.
1968	1,261	—
1975	1,199	−0.72%
1982	1,216	+0.20%
1990	1,331	+1.14%
1999	1,437	+0.86%
2007	1,672	+1.91%
2012	1,735	+0.74%
2017	1,688	−0.55%
2023	1,656	−0.32%
Source: INSEE

== See also ==
- Communes of the Ardennes department
