= French green and blue infrastructure =

French national policy to maintain and restore ecological corridors for biodiversity

In France, the green and blue infrastructure (TVB, from the French trame verte et bleue) has officially designated since 2007 one of the major national projects arising from the Grenelle Environnement. It consists of the entire network of biological corridors (or ecological corridors, existing or to be restored), landscape corridors.. and "biodiversity reservoirs", with protected areas being essential to these ecological continuities.

It aims to halt the biodiversity loss (both extraordinary and ordinary) as the landscape becomes increasingly fragmented. It is also the national version of the pan-European ecological network. It should enable animal and plant species to move around in order to carry out the important stages of their life cycle (feeding, resting, reproduction, etc.). It should also facilitate the genetic exchanges necessary for the survival of wild species, as well as the movement of the “distribution areas” of wild species and natural habitats, under the constraints of climate change. The “green” part corresponds to natural and semi-natural terrestrial environments, and the “blue” component refers to the aquatic and wetland network (rivers, streams, wetlands, estuaries, etc.).

It is finally a major framework and tool for spatial planning, for the ecological restoration of the territory in France. It is based upstream on consultation involving the State, local authorities, and a large number of stakeholders, including environmental protection associations. Between 2011 and 2015, regional ecological coherence plans (SRCE) were developed and implemented in each region. These documents must now be translated into coordinated regional and local strategies (notably through SCoTs and other urban planning documents) and concrete actions (e.g., preservation of functionalities, mapping, construction of wildlife crossings, intentional management and restorative management).

The national biodiversity strategy is implemented at regional level (including overseas territories) through regional biodiversity strategies (RBS, also promoted by the IUCN)), as well as through Agenda 21 and other territorial strategies, action plans of local authorities (“The State and local authorities will work to strengthen actions, co-organizing them where necessary and ensuring their consistency)).

== Administration ==
In May 2011, most regions had begun developing their SRCE. They did so either by updating an existing TVB (Alsace, Nord-Pas-de-Calais), by conducting a preliminary study for the SRCE, or by drafting specifications for this study. "Preliminary committees for regional green and blue belt committees” (bodies making proposals to the State and the Region, co-developers of the SRCE) had already been set up in Franche-Comté, Poitou-Charentes(February 2011) and in May in Limousin, Nord-Pas-de-Calais, Pays de la Loire, Rhône-Alpes, with a coordinated approach at the national level by Fabienne Allag-Dhuisme, TVB project manager at the Ministry of Ecology

In June 2011, a national committee and regional committees responsible for the green and blue infrastructure were officially prepared by two executive orders published on July 29, 2011 (not applying in Corsica or the overseas departments). Their composition and operation are governed by the provisions of executive order № 2006-672 of June 8, 2006, as amended, relating to the creation, composition and operation of administrative commissions with advisory status.

- The National TVB Committee has worked under the auspices of two ministries (Environment and Urban Planning). It is a forum for information, discussion, and consultation on ecological continuities, covering topics such as creation, preservation, and restoration, including at the European and international levels.
  It has been tasked with defining national guidelines and ensuring national coherence of the green and blue infrastructure. It is involved in developing, updating and monitoring National guidelines for the preservation and restoration of ecological continuities to good status (provided for in Section L.371-2) and draft executive order, circular and methodological documents on these national guidelines. The Minister of the Environment informs the national committee of the adopted SRCEs (regional ecological coherence plans), as well as an analysis of their contribution to the national coherence of the green and blue networks, followed by analyses of the results of their implementation. The committee may use recommendations to improve the preservation and restoration of ecological continuity when each of regional ecological coherence plans is revised. It is made up of five colleges (10 members each), including a college of elected representatives (representing the National Assembly, the Senate, the ARF, the ADF, the AMF, the ADCF, the Association of overseas communes and communities, the Federation of regional natural parks of France, the basin committees and the National Water Committee). It was officially installed on October 18, 2011 by the ministers or secretaries of state Nathalie Kosciusko-Morizet (Ecology), Thierry Mariani (Transport) and Benoist Apparu (Housing). It is chaired by Jérôme Bignon (UMP deputy for the Somme), assisted by two vice-presidents, one representing farmers (the president of the permanent assembly of chambers of agriculture), and the other representing naturalists (the president of France Nature Environnement). Under their leadership, various stakeholders involved in nature conservation and management, land use planning, agriculture, fishing, hunting, etc. will work together to help the minister finalize the decree implementing the green and blue Belt before the end of 2011
- Regional committees are chaired by the prefect and the president of the Region. They serve as forums for information, discussion, and consultation on any subject related to ecological continuity, its preservation, and restoration at the regional level, while taking into account initiatives and progress in neighboring regions, including cross-border regions where applicable. The members, who perform their duties free of charge, develop, monitor, and update regional ecological coherence plans that foreshadow future green and blue networks, ensuring consistency with the guidelines of the national TVB and SDAGEs. They analyze the “results obtained in terms of the preservation and restoration of ecological continuity through the implementation of the regional ecological coherence plan” and may also be consulted “on all matters relating to regional and local biodiversity strategies,” with five colleges representing local authorities at least 30% of committee members), the State (at least 15%), socio-professional organizations and nature users (at least 20%), environmental associations (at least 15%) and scientists (at least 5%). These regional committees are informed by the president of the Regional Council and the prefect “of scientific work carried out on ecological continuity, its preservation or restoration within the region or neighboring regions, including cross-border regions, if they are aware of it.” Their composition is decided jointly by the president of the region and the prefect for a term of six years (Art. D. 371-11). They meet at least once a year, as necessary when convened by the presidents, and at least once a year. The agenda is set by the presidents, but if more than half of the members so request, this committee may meet and issue proposals or recommendations on its own initiative (Art. D. 371-12.). The Region and the Prefecture provide the committee's secretariat. Specialized commissions may be created (with internal rules setting out the list, composition, powers, and operating procedures of these commissions, as well as the cases in which the committee may delegate its advisory powers to them).
- An internet portal called National Green and Blue Infrastructure Resource Centre, has since October 18, 2011 allowed access to online resources on this theme.
- The OFB (formerly AFB) sets up or coordinates training useful for TVB stakeholders.

== History ==
The concepts of infrastructure and ecological network, as tools for biodiversity restoration and protection and spatial planning, emerged in the 1990s, in the context of the Convention on Biological Diversity (Rio 1992), in Europe the Habitats Directive (EU 1992) and the Pan-European Biological and Landscape Diversity Strategy (Sofia 1995).

First tested in Northern European countries, they have been implemented on a European scale with the Pan-European Ecological Network, which they must apply to all levels of territory.

In France, several regions tested the creation of a network of biological corridors from the mid-1990s (Nord-Pas-de-Calais, Alsace, department of Isère). In 1999, the Voynet law, also known as LOADDT, through the Collective service scheme for natural areas introduced the notion of ecosystem services provided by biodiversity.

In 2004, a National Biodiversity Strategy aimed in particular (flagship action № 17) to restore minimal ecological connectivity at different territorial levels. The national biodiversity strategy (SNB) is one of the main implementations of the European strategy mentioned above. It must respond to local issues, as well as the guidelines of the Convention on Biological Diversity (ratified by France in 1994). France has a major environmental responsibility in the world due to its unique situation. It must manage a particularly extensive marine environment (in all oceans) and a natural terrestrial heritage that is also rich in the long term.

Then, in 2007, the theme of "ecological corridors", "ecological connectivities" was widely taken up by the participants in the Grenelle Environment Forum and enshrined in the Grenelle I and Grenelle II laws. These laws clearly introduce, for the first time in French law and urban planning documents, the notion of ecological continuity. The notion of ecological network (the framework) was in 2009 translated and proposed in a draft law (know as the Grenelle II law), and various documents or policy proposals. Three methodological guides coordinated by INRAE (formerly Irstea) were consulted on and improved between 2008 and 2010. Designed to help government and local authorities implement the network from the national level down to the level of local urban planning (PLU), territorial coherence and sustainability plans (SCoT) and communal map, they can be downloadable from the green and blue network resource centre website.

The implementation of the green and blue infrastructure is part of a set of biodiversity measures introduced or specified in the Grenelle II law. This law also proposes certification of the environmental quality of farms, strengthens the protection of wetlands and water quality, and recognizes - through a national maritime strategy - the importance of marine biodiversity for which France is one of the main stakeholders in terms of maritime area (overseas territories) and number of species or habitats concerned.

Its mapping, based on data and methods validated by an operational committee following the Grenelle Environment Forum, taking into account land use and mapping of agricultural areas with high natural valueusing different tools, was carried out at national level. Since January 2018, it has been available online on the National Natural Heritage Inventory website.

The green and blue network has been expanded in parallel with new networks that take into account new components to address "intangible" sources of fragmentation or complex interactions between environments. These new networks include the black network relating to light pollution, the white network relating to noise pollution, the brown network for soil, the aerial network for flying species, and the turquoise network for areas where terrestrial and aquatic environments meet.

== Objectives ==
The 2009 bill assigned to the TVB the general objective of halting biodiversity loss (both extraordinary and ordinary), in a context of climate change.
It is also the national implementation of the Pan-European Ecological Network. The statement of reasons for the law specifies and recognises that "scientific advances in conservation biology demonstrate the limitations and inadequacies of traditional policies for creating protected areas (regardless of their legal status), which focus on remarkable species or habitats. “ The legislator explains that ”it is now essential to think in terms of the connectivity and functionality of ecosystems on a very large spatial scale, integrating not only the mobility of species and, to a lesser extent, ecosystems, but also ordinary biodiversity." (These are also the objectives of Europe and the UN.)

The COMOP listed 7 priority objectives:

1. Reduce fragmentation and vulnerability of natural habitats and species habitats;
2. Identify, map and connect important areas for biodiversity preservation through ecological corridors;
3. Achieve or maintain the "good ecological status" or "good potential" of surface waters;
4. Take into account the biology of migratory species;
5. Enable and facilitate genetic exchanges necessary for the survival of wild species;
6. Improve landscape quality and diversity;
7. Enable and facilitate the movement of "ranges" of wild species and natural habitats in the face of climate change.

The objectives primarily concern biodiversity and more sustainable, even restorative land use planning, but social benefits are also expected. For Robert Barbault, creating the green and blue belt also means "reconnecting living networks so that biodiversity can function, but it also means reconnecting social ties around nature, which is essential to us."

However, Chantal Jouanno, former Secretary of State for Ecology, believes "we do not know how to quantify the benefit provided by biodiversity [...] we cannot quantify all that is remarkable biodiversity [...] in fact, we arrive at figures that are far below reality".

== Definition of the green and blue infrastructure ==
The SNB in its glossary describes the TVB as: "Structuring approach that consists of incorporating the preservation and restoration of ecological continuities into spatial planning decisions. It includes a green component referring to terrestrial natural and semi-natural environments and a blue component referring to the aquatic and wetland network" (rivers, streams, wetlands...).

The definition of the green and blue infrastructure is specified by the Environmental Code (Book III, Title VII), as follows:

- Art. L. 371-1. – I. – The green and blue infrastructure aims to halt biodiversity loss by contributing to the preservation, management and restoration to good status of environments necessary for ecological continuities, while taking into account human activities, particularly agricultural activities in rural areas. This legislative article of the Environmental Code also aims at "improving landscape quality and diversity".
1. “Reduce the fragmentation and vulnerability of natural habitats and species habitats and take into account their displacement in the context of climate change”;
2. “Identify, preserve, and connect areas that are important for the preservation of biodiversity through ecological corridors”; important areas are referred to as core areas, sometimes also referred to as ZIEM or Areas of Major Ecological Interest(terminology not used in the law);
3. “Implement the objectives set out in IV of Article L. 212-1 and preserve the wetlands referred to in 2° and 3° of III of this article”;
4. “Take into account the biology of wild species”;
5. “Facilitate the genetic exchanges necessary for the survival of wild fauna and flora species”;
6. “Improve the quality and diversity of landscapes."

An executive order dated December 27, 2012 confirms that the green and blue belt is "a network formed by terrestrial and aquatic ecological continuities identified by regional ecological coherence plans as well as by documents from the State, local authorities and their groupings to which legislative provisions recognize this competence and, where applicable, that of delimiting or locating these continuities.“ It is also a ”tool for sustainable land use planning. It extends to the low-tide line and, in estuaries, to the transverse limit of the sea. Furthermore, “the identification and delimitation of the ecological continuities of the green and blue network must, in particular, enable animal and plant species whose preservation or restoration is a national or regional issue to move around in order to ensure their life cycle and promote their ability to adapt”.

=== Sub-definitions of green and blue infrastructures ===
Still according to the Environmental Code:

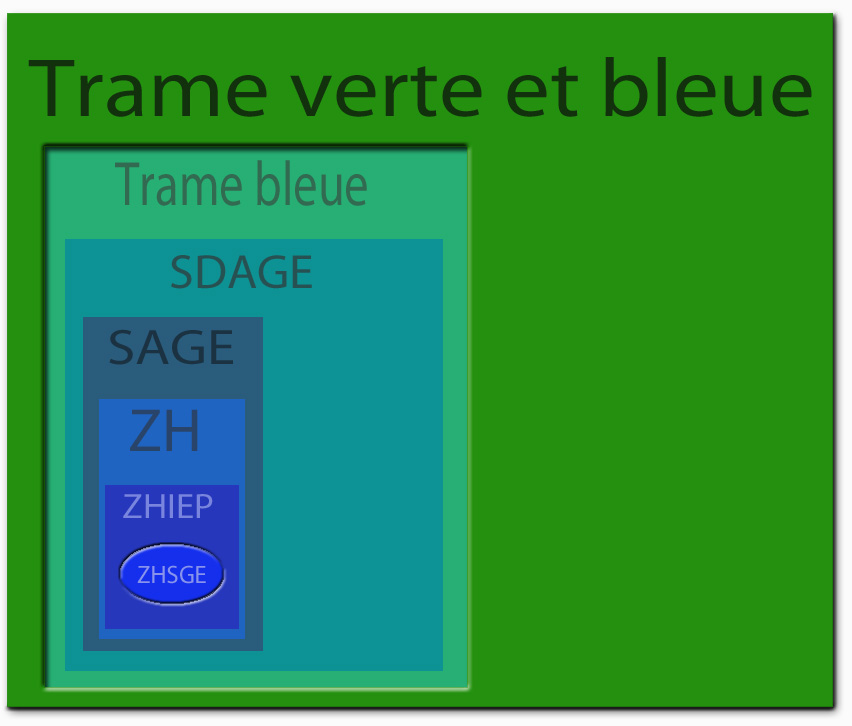
Wetlands are at the heart of blue infrastructure devices, in a relatively fractal way, from global scale (at least Pan-European) to the most local scales (ponds, streams, ditches...). This graphic presents the zoning of different levels of management and protection tools for France and Europe, including SDAGEs, SAGEs and ZHIEP, all of which must contribute to achieving a "good status of water bodies" objective before 2015.

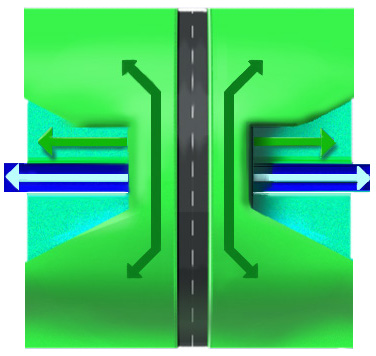
Ecological landscape reconnection can be done in multiple ways, including - to a certain extent (avoiding ecological traps) on the edges of linear infrastructures.

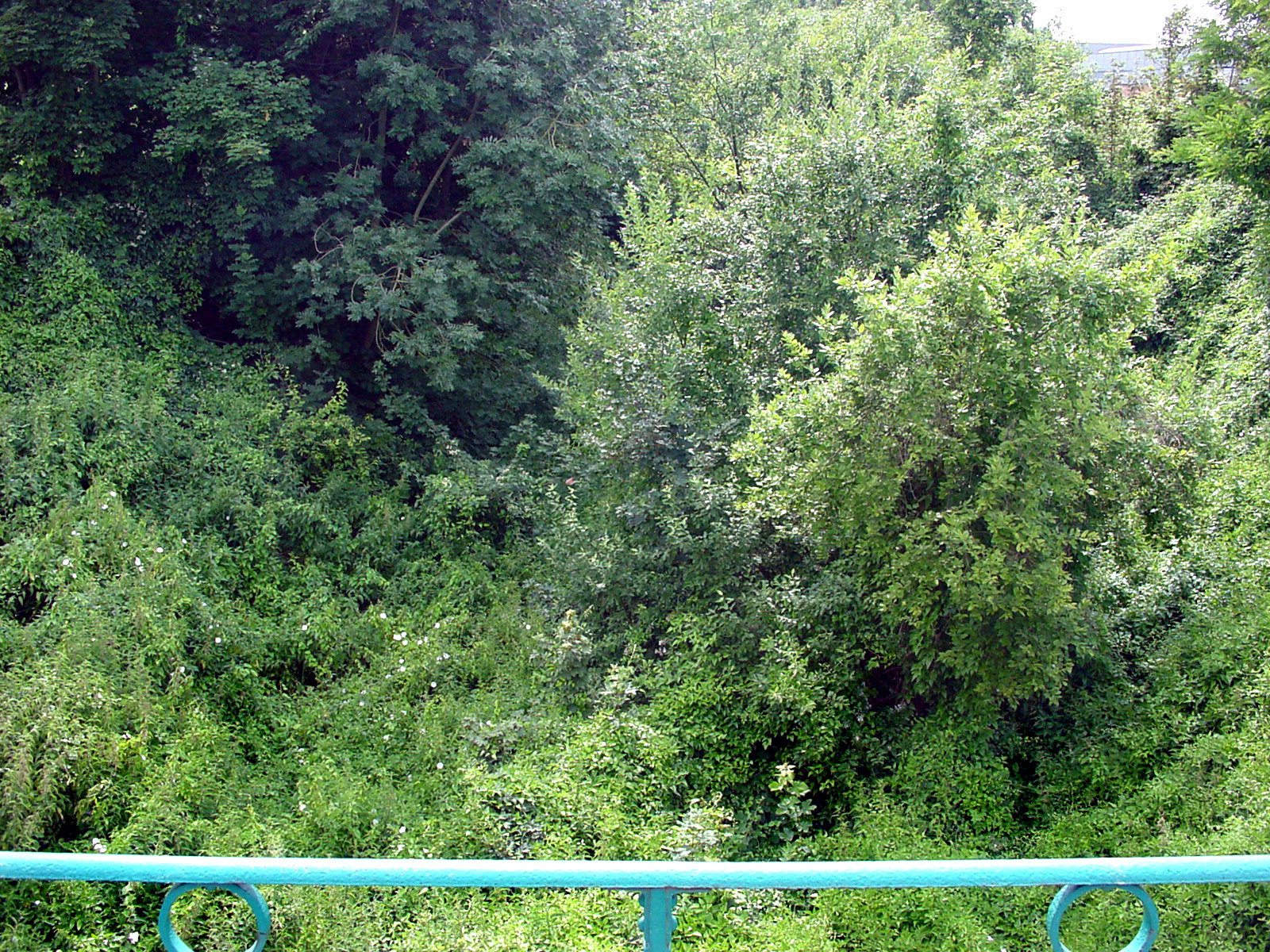
Industrial brownfields can sometimes contribute to the green infrastructure (Here, a "mining ridge" (abandoned former railway in the Mining Basin of Nord-Pas-de-Calais), which after renaturation forms one of the biological corridors of the mining basin's green infrastructure

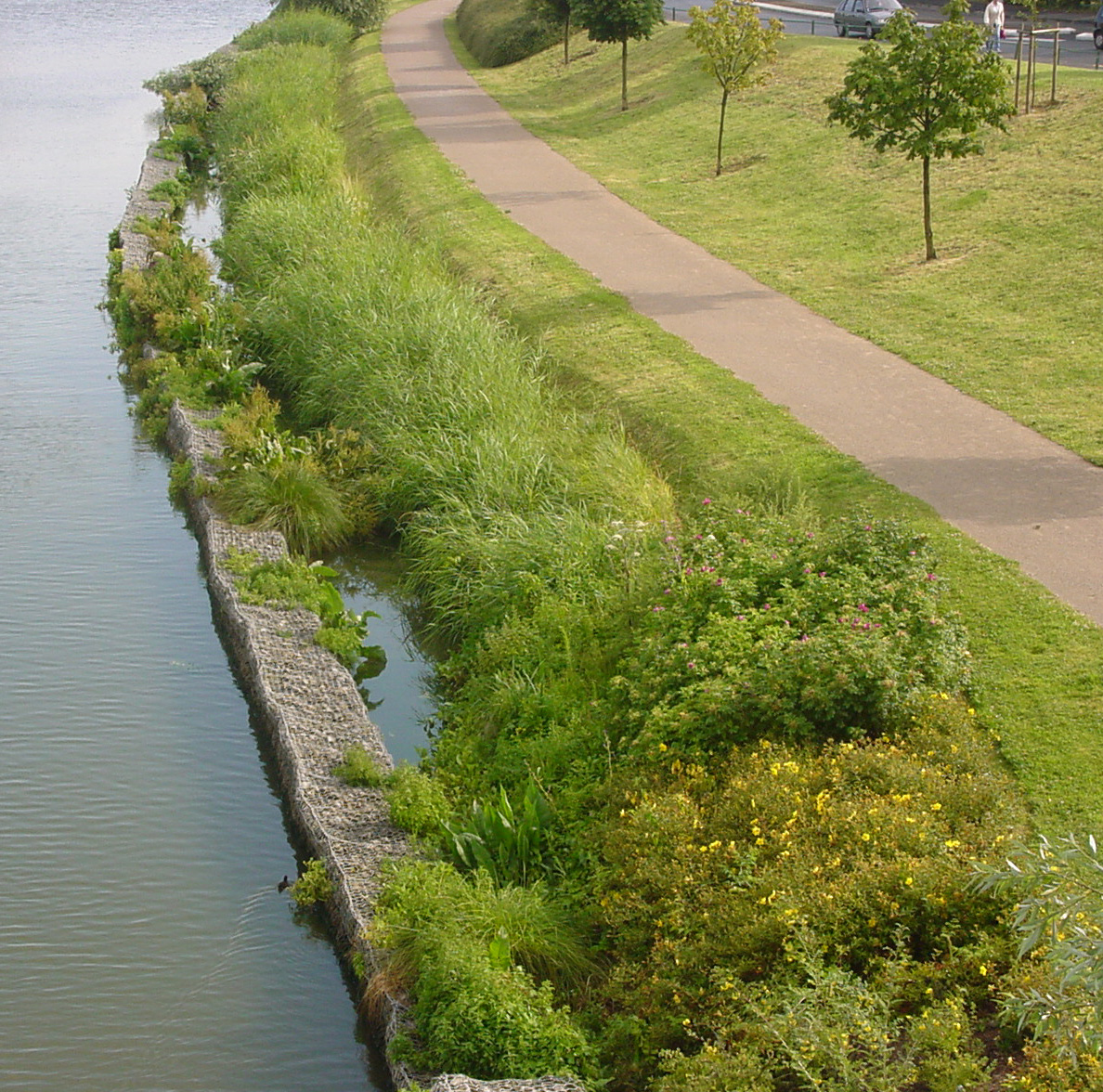
Linear lagooning on the banks of the Deûle.

- The green infrastructure includes:

« 1° All or part of protected areas under this book and title 1st of book IV as well as natural areas important for biodiversity preservation;
« 2° Ecological corridors consisting of natural or semi-natural areas as well as linear or punctual vegetation formations, allowing connection of areas mentioned in 1°;
« 3° Areas mentioned in I of article L. 211-14.

- The blue infrastructure includes:

« 1° Rivers, parts of rivers or canals appearing on lists established under article L. 214-17;
« 2° All or part of wetlands whose preservation or restoration contributes to achieving objectives targeted in IV of article L. 212-1, and in particular wetlands mentioned in article L. 211-3;
« 3° Rivers, parts of rivers, canals and wetlands important for biodiversity preservation and not targeted in 1° or 2° of this III.

=== General principles ===
From the identification of biodiversity issues ("remarkable or ordinary: environments and patrimonial species, main threats, problem species, invasive, "environmental" risks linked to species circulation etc."), regions identify by major landscape unit and issues the broad features of their ecological functioning and analyse, diagnose, map and hierarchise degrees and causes of ecological fragmentation of the territory (natural or artificial obstacles...). In this work of identifying its green and blue infrastructure, each region is free to use the method of its choice and in this respect to use or not species.

The infrastructure is made for species and natural habitats, but these species and habitats also contribute to making the infrastructure.

Particular attention should be paid to invasive species that could take advantage of ecological continuities to colonize new territories: this issue would require the establishment of specific governance.

=== Infrastructures and sub-infrastructures ===
Large habitats may be divided into sub-networks. For example, a network of limestoe grasslands will be a sub-infrastructure of an open thermophilic environments network; a network of forest ponds may constitute a sub-infrastructure of a ponds network, itself a sub-infrastructure of the wetland network of the blue infrastructure.

The national guide (April 2009 version) asks regions to base themselves on at least five sub-infrastructures:

1. sub-infrastructure of forest environments (low-altitude forests, high-altitude forests, ravine forests, floodable forests, coniferous stands, deciduous, mixed..);
2. sub-infrastructure of wet open environments (wet meadows, marshes, peat bogs...);
3. sub-infrastructure of xeric open environments (dunes, heaths, open garrigues, maquis, calcareous or acid grasslands...);
4. sub-infrastructure of large crop environments;
5. sub-infrastructure of aquatic environments (aquatic and wet environments, wetlands, rivers, lagoon complexes).

Specific habitats such as rocky areas (mountain ranges, rock faces and outcrops, rocky coasts, etc.), or semi-natural areas (hedgerows, public parks, etc.), possibly undergoing more or less spontaneous renaturation (slag heaps, quarries, etc.), cave or underground environments (particularly those that are home to bats or are likely to be home to bats) may be taken into account.

== Integration ==
Certain planning documents and projects at the national level must be compatible with national guidelines for the preservation and restoration of ecological continuity; these are those that are approved or decided by law, decree, or ministerial order.

The compatibility of these planning documents and projects is assessed in particular with regard to impacts likely to be caused to areas constituting the green and blue infrastructure under article L. 371-1 as well as to species, habitats and ecological continuities of national importance identified as constituting national and cross-border issues by the framework document adopted under article L. 371-2.

The legislative obligation to “take into account” is a hierarchical link that also exists between, on the one hand, territorial coherence plans and, on the other hand, regional plans for sustainable development and territorial equality, regional plans for the development of marine aquaculture, regional quarry plans, and departmental plans for access to forest resources (in addition to the SCOT taking into account the SRCE): hierarchy of standards established by Section L.131-2 of the Urban Planning Code.

This type of relationship (of consideration) also exists between local urban planning plans and documents serving as such on the one hand, and territorial climate-air-energy plans on the other, as well as departmental plans for access to forest resources.

=== Integration by urban planning documents ===
The bill proposed to amend the Urban Planning Code so that:

- Territorial directives for sustainable planning and development now integrate "preservation of natural, agricultural and forest areas, sites and landscapes, coherence of ecological continuities"
- Territorial coherence schemes (SCoT), local urban plans (PLU) and communal maps must now determine conditions allowing to ensure [...] "reduction of greenhouse gas emissions, preservation of air, water, soil and subsoil quality, natural resources, biodiversity, ecosystems, green areas, preservation and restoration of ecological continuities, prevention of foreseeable natural risks, technological risks, pollution and nuisances of all kinds.". SCoTs must now take into account, as soon as they exist, regional ecological coherence schemes and territorial climate plans and they must also define intercommunal objectives and priorities in [...] preservation and restoration of ecological continuities. And in each SCoT, the PADD (Sustainable planning and development project) must from 2008 integrate a new objective of "preservation and restoration of ecological continuities"". In the same spirit, the Document d'orientation et de programmation must now also "determine natural, agricultural, forest or urban areas and sites to protect"" specifying "protection modalities for areas necessary for maintaining biodiversity and preservation or restoration of ecological continuities"" (with "quantified objectives for economical space consumption that can be broken down by geographical sector".
  The PLU must now also define rules [...] of "protection and preservation or restoration of ecological continuities".
- Measures necessary for implementing territorial directives for sustainable planning and development (under conditions set in article L. 113-4) can become public interest project, as well as any work, works or protection project presenting a character of public utility and cumulatively meeting the following conditions: "1° Intended for carrying out a planning or equipment operation, operation of a public service, reception and housing of disadvantaged or modest resource persons, protection of natural or cultural heritage, risk prevention, development of natural resources, agricultural and rural planning or preservation of ecological continuities.

In 2011, in its commitments for implementing the new national biodiversity strategy (May 2011), the State in a section Land use and land action plans to set up easements (DUP or contractual devices of the environmental easement type) to locally preserve a certain naturalness.

Local authorities will be able to include in PLUs an ecological continuity area (requested in 2010 by FNE), to materialise the green and blue infrastructure in urban planning and development documents.

== Method and development schedule ==
The green and blue infrastructure, as presented in 2009relied on available scientific knowledge. It also benefited from more than two years of work by Grenelle de l'environnement groups. An operational committee COMOP "Green and blue infrastructure" led by senator Paul Raoult, assisted by two co-project leaders (Christian Barthod (DEB) and Vincent Graffin from the Muséum national d'histoire naturelle (MNHN)), was assisted for scientific and technical aspects by INRAE (formerly Irstea), the Muséum, the ONEMA and local authorities (ARF, ADF, AMF, ADCF-ACUF, federation of PNR). Some NGOs including France nature environnement (FNE) which published numerous proposals, for the TVB and organised its 33rd annual congress (in Lille, in 2009) on this theme. Numerous experts and socio-economic partners were also consulted. The Natural Heritage Service of the Muséum national d'histoire naturelle (MNHN-SPN) made available with the Office for insects and their environment in 2013 documents on "life history traits" of species vulnerable to fragmentation to help draft SRCE and develop regional ecological network infrastructures and sub-infrastructures. The MNHN-SPN also published in 2014 under the TVB resource centre two reports on climate change and light pollution. These reports provide a state of knowledge and propose ways to take these issues into account through ecological networks, particularly in connection with the national TVB (green and blue infrastructure).

Schedule (still partly provisional):

- 2008: establishment of the reference framework;
- 2009 to 2011: national map at 1:500000 of national and cross-border issues, mapping at scale 1:500000 for all of France, and at 1:100000 for regional schemes, according to initial discussions), concerning ecological continuities, but also discontinuities. These maps were to be produced at national level before the end of 2011 (postponed to 2012-2013).
- 2009 to 2012: consultation on regulatory modalities (inclusion in urban planning documents) contractual and incentive and development of the infrastructure in regions (development, public inquiry, opinions of CESR and CNPN, and validation of Regional Schemes of Ecological Coherence (SRCE) in 2009-2012) ;
- 2012: publication of the first regional infrastructures submitted to public inquiry via the SRCE.
- 2018: All regional SRCE data are now available and their synthesis has enabled the creation of the national green and blue infrastructure mapping.

The TVB will rely on:

- the concerted development of a "biodiversity criterion" for the DGF;
- opposability of the infrastructure to major infrastructures;
- possible remuneration of the "environmental service";
- integration into the Pan-European Ecological Network, particularly to improve ecological resilience and climate change adaptation.

=== Coherence criteria (national, interregional, cross-border...) ===
They are established under the authority of regional and national committees, by;

- common mapping for French regions so that consultation can take place on comparable bases and to ensure national cartographic homogeneity (cf. Annex VI), each region having to produce its map at the minimum scale of 1/100 000th (at a finer scale when the land use background allows it (for example at 1/50 000th). Regions that had not yet started their green and blue infrastructure in 2009 will integrate into their mappings and strategies the elements imposed by law and will follow the 5 national coherence criteria defined and proposed by Guide № 2 of the COMOP TVB (These 5 criteria concern "existing zonings"; "aquatic and wet environments"; interregional and cross-border coherence; "species" criterion; "habitats" criterion) ;
- (for the blue infrastructure) taking into account (already theoretically mandatory in urban planning documents) ecological continuity orientations appearing in SDAGEs or their measure programmes ;
- consultation with neighbouring countries and at interregional level, aiming to agree on common eco-landscape elements of territories sharing a border (corridor, buffer zone, "biodiversity reservoir" straddling two territories; which is very frequent for rivers or mountain ranges often serving as border limits).
- The MNHN published (end 2011) a report on national coherence criteria, with maps of major national ecological continuities by habitat types at national scale.

==== Five coherence criteria ====
1. "Existing zonings" criterion: The COMOP TVB decided in 2010 that must be taken into account stricto sensu in each SRCE the strong protection zonings of the Strategy for creation of Protected Areas: prefectoral biotope protection orders (APPB), cores of national parks (PN), national nature reserves (RNN), regional nature reserves (RNR), nature reserves of Corsica (RNC), sites classified explicitly for biodiversity, biological reserves in public forests). Non-inclusion of one of the other existing zonings in the SRCE must be justified;
2. "Aquatic and wet environments" criterion: The COMOP TVB also retained in 2010 this criterion to guarantee SRCE coherence vis-à-vis "areas already identified by current water policy tools and in particular those necessary for achieving result objectives pursued by the water framework directive and translated in Water Development and Management Master Plans (SDAGEs)" (MEDDTL, Guide 2 TVB).
3. "Species" criterion: Coherence species were not chosen to construct the TVB, but to measure the coherence of regions in relation to the national level; it is only one of five criteria, which are not ranked in order of importance. “Furthermore, behind a TVB species lies the habitat of that TVB species. This is particularly important for so-called ‘umbrella’ species, as other non-selected species will thus benefit from the consideration given to this umbrella species.” The habitat approach and the species approach are complementary depending on the scale considered and the objectives (construction, validation, communication, etc.) to be achieved.
4. "Natural habitats" criterion: Habitat refers to the place where a species lives, defined by its spatial environment, both biotic and abiotic. This concept should be distinguished from the concept of natural habitat, which refers to a recognizable whole formed by site conditions (climate, soil, relief) and a characteristic biocoenosis (plant communities are often used to describe natural habitats because of their integrative nature (phytosociology)). Refer to the report on the “habitats” criterion for more details. The Comop TVB distinguishes species habitats (here of coherence criterion species) and natural or semi-natural habitats in general; it asked the MNHN to produce habitat lists (non-exhaustive lists intended to ensure coherence and not SRCE identification), noting that France lacked data comparable to those concerning species and that would allow determining regions' national responsibility in habitat matters; it also encouraged finer scientific work on connectivity between environments for their maintenance.
5. "Interregional and cross-border" criterion.

== Administrative implementation ==
In 2005, a "green and blue infrastructure exchange group" was created, as a place for exchanges between "experts" and "practitioners" of infrastructures and ecological corridors (in 2011, it associated about a hundred members: PNR, public establishments, local authorities, associations, research laboratories...).

In 2009, this green and blue infrastructure was not yet defined and even less implemented locally at the finest scales. It calls for broad partnership, involving in particular the skills of the new Agency for Marine Protected Areas, the Conservatoire du littoral, the Conservatoires d'espaces naturels, national parks, regional natural parks and nature reserves (via RNF (Réserves naturelles de France) and via regions responsible for regional nature reserves), the ONEMA and the ONCFS (National Office for Hunting and Wildlife), the Office national des forêts, the Network of Grand Sites of France, Rivages de France, etc.

To do this, and to help those who will map it and who will apply and protect it, the law (art. L.371-2 of the Environmental Code) provides for two framework documents.

=== National guidelines for the preservation and restoration of ecological continuities ===
Two initial versions of this document (the second dated April 10, 2009) were developed by the State "in consultation with local authorities, socio-professional partners, basin committees, concerned approved environmental protection associations and [...] qualified personalities due to their skills in environmental protection". These guidelines are subject to public and local authority observations, before adoption by decree in Council of State. This document was based in particular on available scientific knowledge in biodiversity and landscape ecology and natural heritage inventory and expert opinions.

This framework document includes:

- A "presentation of strategic choices likely to contribute to the preservation and restoration of ecological continuities: To subsidiarily protect the green infrastructure, by integrating it into PLU and SCoTs, 16 "strategic choices" are listed(without total consensus at the Grenelle for one of the choices). They can be grouped as follows:
  - a first choice is that of subsidiarity. Choices 2 and 3 are to spatialise the TVB (mobilising scientific knowledge) in urban planning documents, based on the "national methodological guide", in a logic of "ecological coherence", specifying choices 4 and 5, and identifying at all spatial scales (international, national, regional and local) on the one hand major corridors "whose functionality maintenance should be guaranteed", and on the other hand corridors organised in "sub-infrastructure (by environment)" networks that should be strengthened, created or restored (choices 6, 7), integrating climate uncertainty (choice 8), and the specificity of the blue infrastructure (which refers to the SDAGE), taking into account fragmenting impacts (or "sometimes positive") of infrastructures (choices 10 to 13). The 14th choice invites regional schemes to propose scenarios of project management solutions to compensate the fragmenting effect of already old infrastructures. The 15th choice invites to rely on the existing, while mobilising new resources and point 16 invites to develop adapted governance with all stakeholders.
  - A "methodological guide". This identifies "national and cross-border issues relating to the preservation and restoration of ecological continuities" and includes a section relating to the development of "regional ecological coherence schemes"; It recalls:
  1. principles, structure and components of the TVB by proposing to constitute it by assembling 7 sub-infrastructures (low-altitude forests, high-altitude forests and pastures, dry thermophilic zones, subalpine grasslands and heaths, extensive agricultural zones and edges, aquatic and wet environments, rocky zones). This guide insists on the need for multi-scale coherence, and therefore to work on a common basis of determining species, while leaving however free choice of method for each region.
  2. methodological recommendations (participatory approach, diagnosis of issues)
  3. Aids to implementation, taking into account socio-economic aspects (partnerships-contractualisation + awareness, information and training of stakeholders).

Early 2014, an executive order specifies (in annex) the national guidelines for the preservation and restoration of ecological continuities, providing a framework document for the national TVB, consisting of two parts:

1. a reminder of strategic choices, definitions and major objectives; with breakdown of the 10 major guidelines for implementing the TVB (sustainable territorial planning, biodiversity, shared governance, translation into urban planning documents, ) ;
2. a methodological guide (produced by the Operational Committee, i.e. Comop trame verte et bleue, set up as part of the Grenelle Environment Forum). This guide will help regional councils and regional government departments to develop and implement SRCEs and prepare the work of regional green and blue infrastructure committees (CR-TVB). It sets out the main principles of “national consistency” and identifies national and cross-border issues relating to ecological continuity in terms of objectives and content, including overseas territories.

=== A regional ecological coherence scheme ===
A Regional Scheme of Ecological Coherence or SRCE whose project is developed by the Region and the State, on available scientific bases, with experts and the regional scientific council for natural heritage, in compliance with national guidelines mentioned in article L. 371-2 as well as in compliance with SDAGEs (water development and management master plans). This development is done by associating departments, communal groupings competent in spatial planning or urban planning or, failing that, communes with a land use plan or local urban plan, national parks, regional natural parks, concerned approved environmental protection associations, and representatives of interested socio-professional partners.
This SRCE includes in particular, besides a non-technical summary:

- regional issues relating to the preservation and restoration of ecological continuities;
- natural areas, ecological corridors, as well as rivers, parts of rivers, canals or wetlands identified as elements of the green and blue infrastructure;
- mapping including the green and blue infrastructure;
- contractual measures necessary to preserve and "as needed" restore the "functionality of ecological continuities".

The project and opinions will be submitted to public inquiry by the regional prefect, then possibly modified to take in particular account of public observations, before being submitted to deliberation of the Regional Council, then adopted by regional prefect order who will bring them to the attention of communes or their competent groupings in urban planning matters and keep them available to the public.

Local authorities or their groupings responsible for spatial planning or urban development will now have to draw up or revise their spatial planning and urban development documents, taking these two framework documents into account. For national projects (including major linear infrastructure projects by the State and its public institutions), it must specify the compensatory measures needed to compensate for "the damage to ecological continuity that the implementation of these planning documents, projects, or major linear infrastructure projects is likely to cause".

Sub-infrastructures are emerging, at varying speeds depending on the region. For example, in 2008 and 2009, the Île-de-France Regional Planning and Development Institute began mapping:

- a large fauna infrastructure
- a wet infrastructure
- an aquatic infrastructure
- a wooded infrastructure
- a grassland infrastructure

Evaluation: An executive order will give a certain deadline to an "competent administrative authority" to evaluate the results of the application of the first framework document in terms of preservation and restoration of ecological continuities and to decide on its maintenance or possible revision (the expiry of this framework document not causing that of "regional ecological coherence schemes" specifies the law.
The SRCE after a certain deadline (set by executive order) will be subject to joint analysis by presidents of regional councils and prefects to evaluate the effects of their implementation on the preservation and restoration of ecological continuities, after which regional councils will deliberate on their continuation or revision. The regional prefect will decide in the same terms by prefectural decision. Without concordant decisions or deliberations, the scheme will lapse and must be revised according to the same procedure as for its development.

=== Particular functions devolved to volunteer departments ===
The bill specifies that (in compliance with public procurement rules) departments can be project owner, or assistant to project owner for all work contributing to preserve or restore ecological continuities of the green or blue infrastructure of an adopted SRCE (regional ecological coherence scheme). For missions other than assistance to project ownership, a department can also mobilise the product of the TDENS (departmental tax on sensitive natural areas).

=== Particular functions devolved to NGOs ===
They were associated with the Grenelle de l'environnement process and:

- Following its contribution to the Alsatian ecological network, early March 2008, the association Alsace Nature (Federation grouping 147 local associations) was commissioned by the Ministry of Ecology, experimentally, to complete the work started on the green infrastructure of the Alsace region.
- In 2009, the green infrastructure was the theme of two working days on the occasion of the general assembly of France nature environnement. It must, before July 1, 2008, inventory, hierarchise and map "ecological barriers" (bridges, railways, tunnels, canals, HT lines, etc.) and propose ecological remeshing solutions to these "black spots", with a reproducible method on national territory. This work will serve the Operational Committee of the Grenelle which follows the national green infrastructure project, which will make its first proposals by the end of March, so that they appear in the first Grenelle law, planned before summer.

=== Linear infrastructure managers ===
In June 2011, seven of the largest managers of fragmented linear infrastructure joined forces “to take action in favor of biodiversity" by creating a charter and establishing a “Linear Infrastructure and Biodiversity Club” aimed at strengthening their commitment to biodiversity and forming a reference group for external partners.

These 7 actors are:

- Électricité réseau distribution France ERDF (1,274,600 km of power lines in 2011),
- GRTgaz, subsidiary of GDF SUEZ (1st European network with 32,200 km of steel gas pipelines and 25 compression stations),
- Réseau ferré de France (RFF); 30,000 of railway lines in 2011,
- Réseau de transport d'électricité (RTE) (100,000 km of lines from 63,000 to 400,000 volts and 46 cross-border lines; longest network in Europe in 2011),
- Transport et stockage de gaz naturel (TIGF); 5,000 km of pipelines, 12 % of national gas volume transit, 22 % of French storage capacities in 2011),
- Vinci Autoroutes, Europe's leading motorway operator in 2011; with 4,310 km of motorways in service, including the ASF, Cofiroute and Escota networks).
- Voies navigables de France (VNF) ; 6,100 km of canals and canalised rivers crossed by more than 4,000 engineering structures, with 40,000 hectares of public river domain, including storage areas) created on January 1, 2005 pursuant to the law of August 9, 2004, which transposes into French law the European directive of June 26, 2003, on public electricity and gas services and the electricity and gas industries.

== In Corsica and overseas ==
Particular provisions are proposed for Corsica and overseas

- In Corsica, the sustainable planning and development plan includes a regional green and blue infrastructure Tissitura Verde e Turchina. This PADDUC has provisional value of SRCE (Regional Scheme of Ecological Coherence).
- In overseas departments, the regional planning scheme must include national guidelines on the green infrastructure and will also serve as SRCE. If a regional planning scheme was approved before approval of national guidelines, it would be modified within five years after its approval.
- In Mayotte, the sustainable planning and development plan, must integrate national guidelines for the preservation and restoration of ecological continuities mentioned and will serve as SRCE (regional ecological coherence scheme). If a regional planning scheme was approved before approval of national guidelines, it would be modified within five years after its approval.

== European and international context ==
This infrastructure fits into global strategies (Cf. Convention on Biological Diversity in particular) and Pan-European biodiversity protection.

Border communities (regions, departments) must therefore work closely with their counterparts across the border to jointly develop the ecological network to be protected and ensure that a country's ecological corridors are properly connected.

Many countries in Northern and Eastern Europe are 10 to 15 years ahead in terms of ecological networks. Discussions are underway concerning migratory birds and, more recently, migratory insects (butterflies in particular, with the Monarch butterfly notably in America) and underwater ecological corridors.

=== Cross-border aspects ===
France is associated with several cross-border projects, including for example:

- Hainaut Cross-border Natural Park
- Transalpine ecological network projects, with Switzerland and Italy via CIPRA ("International Commission for the Protection of the Alps") in the Alps and with Spain for the Pyrenees. In both cases patrimonial species of large carnivores (omnivore for the Bear) are concerned (Bear and wolf).
- French Guiana hosts one of the world's richest biological diversities, requiring in particular joint work with Suriname and Brazil, particularly concerning control of damage from gold mining (illegal and legal).
- Natura 2000, Natura 2000 at sea.

== Help and advice ==
Several guides were written by the Comop biodiversity, then by the DREAL Midi-Pyrénées which integrated feedback from 2 SCoT

Furthermore, certain municipalities at the forefront in integrating the French green and blue infrastructure make all their documents and concrete application methods of the green and blue infrastructure available to technicians and municipalities wishing to draw inspiration from them. For example, the Local Urban Plan of the municipality of Noyarey obtained the First regional Rhône-Alpes prize 2013 on eco-responsibility and sustainable development (organised by the Regional Network on Eco-responsibility and Sustainable Development).

== Evaluation and monitoring ==
They are carried out at regional to European scales, via indicators defined at national scale, but partly broken down regionally according to biogeographical characteristics of territories. It involves in particular seeing how - from a structural point of view (spatial organisation of eco-landscapes, relative to ecological potential) and functional (do corridors function as they should?) - the "constituent elements" of regional and national and European green and blue infrastructures evolve

Evaluation: Planned and framed by law, for its "public policy evaluation" part and after verification that the SNB properly took into account all or part of the Aichi targets since validated at the 2010 Nagoya Biodiversity Conference it will be done along the way, and in particular every 6 years during SRCE updates and during updates of the national biodiversity strategy and regional schemes that frame and promote it (SRADT and SRCE, as well as SRB). It is an evaluation mainly "a posteriori" externalised and entrusted to a neutral and independent actor based on a zero state and scientifically collected data by biodiversity observatories and other competent actors.

Monitoring: It is ensured by all project leaders and certain observers.
The concept of Green and blue infrastructure has developed strongly in France since the 2000s in particular.
In 2011, it shows itself as a source of ecological coherence, environmental intercommunal cooperation, but still in appropriation by most inhabitants, elected officials, technicians and local authorities. For this reason, it seems better translated in urban planning documents (on paper) than applied on a large scale or broken down at fine scale on the ground, and sometimes encountering contradictory regulations or deemed priority or highly centralised governance which does not facilitate the transition from scientific theories of landscape ecology to field action, in cities, in countryside or even more on and under the sea.

Certain researchers have been very interested in inhabitants' knowledge of the TVB and analysed the result of numerous inhabitant interviews in various French regions. The finding is alarming: either the TVB is very poorly known, and the notion of biodiversity is almost systematically reduced to animal species or tree in the city ; or the TVB is known but reduced to its aesthetic function.

For the blue infrastructure part, this is done within the framework of the Water Framework Directive (and its schedule for revising SDAGE and measure programmes, every 6 years),

== Exceptions ==
Actions to preserve and restore the environment do not apply to military activities when these activities respond to “a national defense imperative.
