= Environmental responsibilities of French local authorities =

Environmental responsibilities assigned to French local authorities

In France, various environmental responsibilities (living environment, water, air, soil, biodiversity), energy, waste, and sustainable development have progressively been assigned by the legislator to local authorities. These responsibilities are either sovereign and mandatory, or, in some cases, optional. In all cases, they are primarily governed by the General Code of Local Authorities and the French Environmental Code.

These responsibilities have evolved and will continue to evolve, within the framework of ongoing decentralization through successive reforms of municipal responsibilities and decentralization laws, as well as within the framework of the French local government reform.

Within the framework of new decentralization laws expected to be implemented between 2010 and 2020, certain local authorities will be designated as "lead authority" for specific responsibilities to improve the coherence and complementarity of their actions within the same environmental field, particularly through Local Agenda 21 initiatives. Local authorities account for an increasing share of expenditure related to environmental protection.

Overseas collectivities may have specific responsibilities due to their isolated geopolitical situation and their rich environmental heritage.

== History ==
The environmental responsibilities of local authorities were formalized with the emergence of environmental law, generally with a focus on subsidiarity and complementarity. They have evolved in response to growing awareness of emerging issues or even global crises, requiring local and differentiated solutions and/or adaptations to global problems (e.g., energy crises, biodiversity crises, acid rain, climate crisis, seismic risks, eutrophication, and general environmental acidification, widespread pesticide pollution, etc.).

The transfer of responsibilities and the emergence of new responsibilities have led to, according to the IFEN from 2000 to 2007:

the share of public local administration contributions to environmental protection expenditure—that is, the financial effort to prevent, reduce, or eliminate environmental degradation—has steadily increased since 2000. It rose from 22% to 25% in 2005, primarily involving municipalities and their groupings (68%), followed by water agencies (13%), departments (11%), and regions (8%).

The majority of these expenditures are made by municipalities and general councils for wastewater management and waste.

== Environmental responsibilities by type of local authority ==
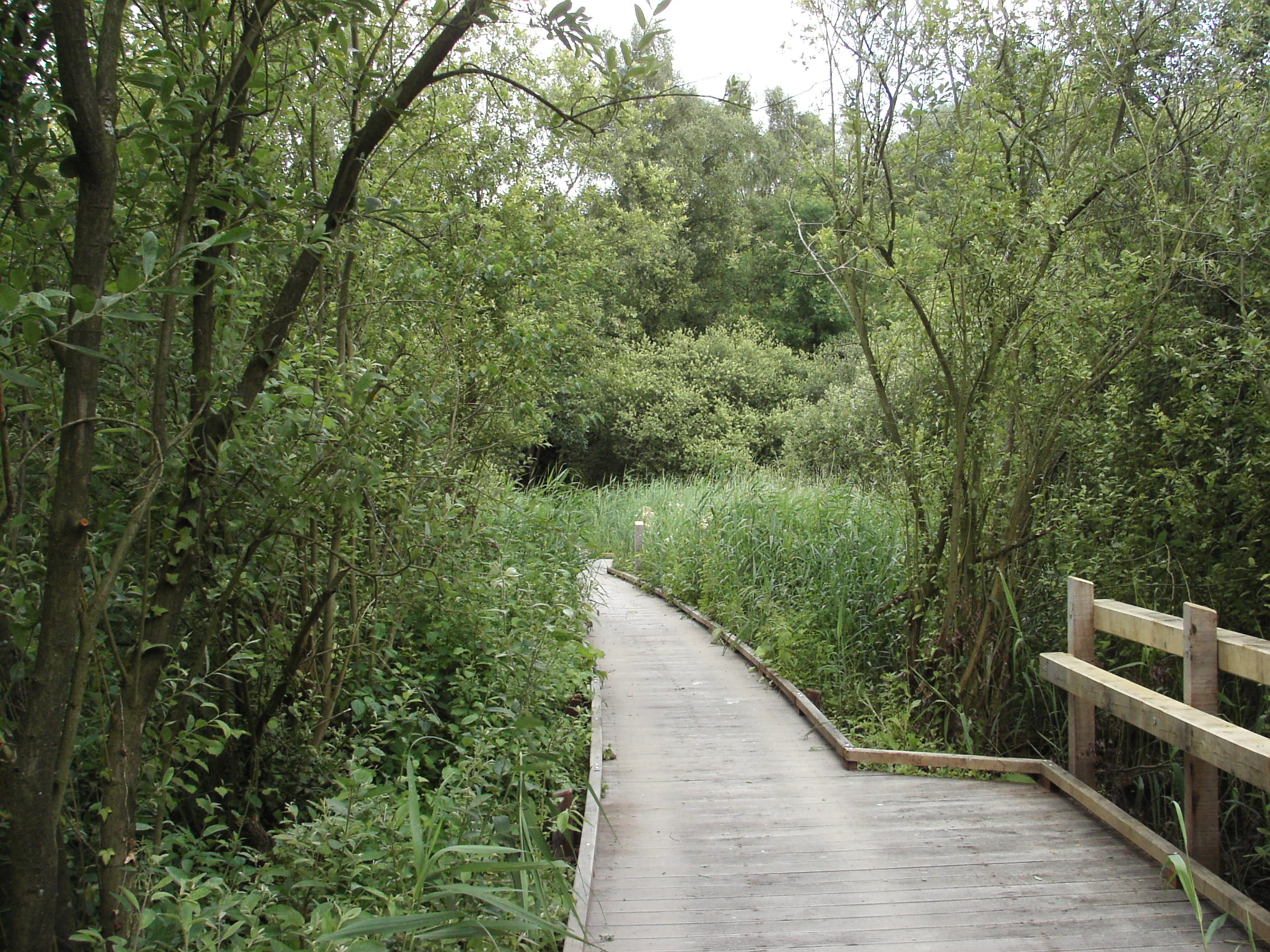
Example of development enabling the discovery of the landscape and biodiversity in a wetland classified as a national nature reserve (RNR du Marais de Cambrin)

=== Region ===
The region primarily has responsibility for spatial planning, translated through the development and periodic revision of a Regional Plan for Spatial Planning and Sustainable Development. It is supported in this field (and others) by the Regional Economic, Social, and Environmental Council (CERESE).

==== Waste ====
The Regions must adhere to two main types of plans.

===== Regional and interregional plans for the prevention and management of hazardous waste =====
On 17, the Minister for the Environment, Nathalie Kosciusko-Morizet, established a national plan for the prevention and management of waste; it aims to prevent and reduce, where possible at the source, the production and harmfulness of waste, promote their reuse (circular economy), reduce the overall impacts of resource use, and improve the efficiency of their use. Each region must establish its regional and interregional plan for the prevention and management of hazardous waste.

The draft plan is developed at the initiative and under the responsibility of the President of the Regional Council, made available to the public for two months, then approved by a resolution of the regional council and published.

===== Regional plan for the disposal of industrial and special waste =====
Each region is covered by a Regional Plan for the Disposal of Industrial and Special Waste (PREDIS).

=== Special case of Île-de-France ===
The Île-de-France must manage, in addition to these two plans, the disposal of household waste and similar waste.

==== Water and sanitation ====
The region must participate in the Water Development and Management Plan (SAGE) and the Schéma directeur d'aménagement et de gestion des eaux (SDAGE). The region must manage the development, maintenance, and operation of watercourses, canals, lakes, and bodies of water.

==== Public transport ====
To reduce pollution and congestion during peak hours, the region manages the organization of regional rail transport with SNCF, a French public company. It develops a Regional Transport Plan, which became the Regional Infrastructure and Transport Plan (SRIT) in 1983.

==== Natural spaces ====
The region has several responsibilities related to natural spaces. It must conduct inventories of natural heritage and local inventories (e.g., through a regional biodiversity observatory). It is responsible for regional nature parks (PNR) and national nature reserves (RNR).

Through the Regional Ecological Coherence Plan (SRCE), it ensures the landscape ecology coherence of the Green and Blue infrastructure (Regional committees develop, monitor, and update regional ecological coherence plans, prefiguring future green and blue frameworks, ensuring consistency with the national Green and Blue Framework guidelines and the SDAGEs).

=== Department ===
The department has limited environmental responsibilities. One of its mandatory responsibilities is the management of Sensitive Natural Areas (ENS). It also primarily acts in the field of waste. Alongside these few responsibilities, the general council may also undertake voluntary actions in the field of environment and sustainable development.

==== Departmental estates ====
The department can act in the field of environment and sustainable development through and with its heritage. These are referred to as departmental estates. Thus, it may choose to enhance, protect, or even have this heritage labeled or ecocertified, possibly as part of a departmental Agenda 21 by incorporating environmental awareness. These actions concern departmental parks (Parc Départemental du Morbras in Sucy-en-Brie), leisure bases (the three departmental bases in Tarn), lakes (the lakes of Cher), and sites and estates with specific characteristics (Domaine de Restinclières in Hérault).

The department can also contribute to the preservation of forest resources through departmental forests.

==== Household and similar waste disposal plan ====
Departmental household and similar waste disposal plans were made mandatory by the law of 13. Their development is the responsibility of the Prefect or the Departmental Council. Their purpose is to encourage and coordinate actions to modernize the management of household and similar waste by local authorities. The plan, as defined at the departmental level, generally includes four elements:

- Objectives for waste recycling and recovery to be achieved;
- Collections and facilities to be implemented to meet the objectives;
- Timelines to be respected;
- Assessments of the investments to be made.

These plans are significant because, once approved, they are binding on public entities and their concessionaires in the department's territory. All actions undertaken by them must be compatible with the plan. Thus, it holds genuine legal and environmental value.

Since the circular of 24 from the Ministry of Spatial Planning and Environment, a general revision of the oldest plans has been sought. Indeed, while these initial plans demonstrated the departments' willingness to act for the environment through waste management, they placed too much emphasis on incineration

==== Water ====
When the department decides to invest in protecting one of the world's most precious resources, this can involve its sanitation, drinking water, the management of watersheds, or the construction of hydraulic structures.

===== Sanitation =====
Sanitation, like drinking water, is not a responsibility of the departments. It falls under the jurisdiction of municipalities, which may transfer this responsibility to an EPCI (particularly with regard to road infrastructure) or a mixed syndicate. However, this does not prevent the department from taking action in this area. It can intervene to provide expertise and utilize its capabilities. Thus, it can technically and financially support municipalities in the construction and management of sewage collection networks and wastewater treatment plants (STEP).

Additionally, there is participation, alongside the water agency, in financing the Technical Assistance Service for Wastewater Treatment Plant Operators (SATESE), a departmental service of the General Council. E.g.: Service d'Assistance Technique aux Exploitants de Stations d'Épuration (SATESE) of the Hérault department.

The department's sanitation service is present to meet the needs of municipalities in the aforementioned areas (expertise, assistance, etc.). It also fulfills a general coordination role with the various authorities responsible for Non-Collective Sanitation (ANC), in collaboration with water agencies. It promotes coordination among different stakeholders, encourages exchanges, and ensures technical and regulatory oversight.

The department may also develop departmental charters. These are less binding than departmental plans and are based on voluntarism, in the spirit of sustainable development and stakeholder engagement to implement certain international commitments of France.

Finally, through departmental sanitation plans, the department can initiate studies to better understand the future needs of its territory. Several General Councils have opted for the drafting of such plans: Deux-Sèvres department.

The special case of the Petite Couronne departments in Paris:

The Hauts-de-Seine (92), Seine-Saint-Denis (93), and Val-de-Marne (94) departments own the sanitation network and handle the collection and transport of effluents (but not the management of wastewater treatment plants). This is a special case that constitutes an exception to the principle that only municipalities are responsible for sanitation. Wastewater treatment in the Paris region is a critical issue due to the high population density: the quality of the entire network is paramount and justifies direct intervention by the departments.

Thus, municipalities exercise their sanitation responsibilities only with regard to local collection and transport. The effluents collected in the municipalities' territories are transported to the facilities of the Interdepartmental Syndicate for the Sanitation of the Paris Agglomeration (SIAAP) via the departmental network.

===== Watersheds and hydraulic structures =====
The departmental level also acts in the management of watersheds and hydraulic structures, whether as a local authority or as a deconcentrated administrative level.

Departments regularly act in the field of water by participating in watershed management, particularly when they are part of Mixed Syndicates. Finally, as part of a policy of risk prevention and balanced water management, departmental authorities may own large dams, the operation of which may be delegated to a private company (Barrage des Olivettes in Vailhan) or small dams that they directly own (Jeantou dam in Saint-Mathieu-de-Tréviers).

Finally, the department contributes to the development of SDAGEs and SAGEs, whether through state services for the drafting and organization of public consultations or through the General Council for informing populations during the implementation of these two plans or ensuring their effective application.

==== Energy ====
In terms of energy, the department also has a role to play since the Grenelle Environment Forum. Indeed, it required departments and municipalities with more than 50,000 inhabitants to draft and adopt Territorial Climate-Energy Plans (PCET) by the end of 2012. These documents are action plans at the departmental level. They start with an assessment of greenhouse gas (GHG) emissions and aim to reduce them.

The Departmental Council may also provide grants to individuals, local authorities, or actors in non-competitive sectors (e.g., medico-social establishments) to encourage them to develop and adopt renewable energy production systems.

Finally, in addition to national regulations, it may draft texts to guide various actors (public or private) in encouraging the development of renewable energy production systems and the adoption of eco-responsible behavior.

=== Municipality ===
Municipalities hold major responsibilities in environmental matters. In addition to the mayor's inherent public health authority, municipalities are responsible for drinking water supply, wastewater sanitation, waste collection and treatment, air pollution control through local transport plans, and coastal enhancement.

==== Waste ====
Waste collection and treatment are concerns at the municipal or intermunicipal level, with potential interactions with the department (household waste) and the region (toxic waste, circular economy).

==== Sanitation and supply ====
Public water distribution and sanitation. This responsibility may also involve the operation of watercourses. Finally, its responsibility may manifest through participation in the Local Water Commission regarding SDAGEs.

==== Energy ====
Municipal responsibility for energy is exercised through participation in the Electricity and Gas Distribution Authority. It may also involve Energy Demand Management in public energy distribution.

==== Urban planning ====
The municipality has numerous tools to implement this responsibility while promoting the environment.

Examples include: SCOT, the Local Urban Plan, and the municipal map. These urban planning instruments are used within the framework of spatial planning, taking the environmental component into account. Through building permits, the municipality can also distribute the impact of environmental considerations across its territory.

=== Overseas Departments and Collectivities (DOM-COM) ===
Given the size of the territory or the population, the environmental stakes (particularly in terms of biodiversity) are often significant in overseas territories, and some elected officials prefer that the State (more distant but presumably less exposed to local lobby pressures) retain environmental responsibilities.

==== Overseas Regions and Departments ====
Overseas territorial collectivities, primarily departments and regions, have broader responsibilities than metropolitan collectivities due to their specific characteristics and local context. Furthermore, recognizing the specificities of these territorial collectivities assumes state acknowledgment to ensure genuine operational efficiency, particularly regarding the environment.

Overseas regions (Martinique, Réunion, Guadeloupe, and French Guiana) have the same responsibilities as metropolitan regions, but there are some specificities due to the significant biodiversity of their natural spaces, as well as climatic and geological characteristics, and high seismic and volcanic activity in these overseas territorial collectivities.

===== Specific responsibilities of overseas regions =====
In environmental matters, the regions, in collaboration with other territorial collectivities and the State, promote respect, protection, and maintenance of the knowledge, innovations, and practices of indigenous and local communities based on their traditional lifestyles that contribute to the conservation of the natural environment and the sustainable use of biological diversity. Additionally, they define the actions to be taken regarding the environment and living conditions after consultation with local authorities and the council for culture, education, and the environment.

Regarding the sea, the regions are consulted on any draft international agreement concerning the exploration, exploitation, conservation, or management of natural, biological, and non-biological resources in the exclusive economic zone (EEZ) off their coasts. For the Réunion region specifically, it is informed annually about the development and implementation of high seas fishing programs (artisanal fishing or deep-sea high seas fishing) by shipowners.

Regarding energy, due to their high energy dependency, overseas regions aim to improve their territories' energy autonomy by promoting renewable energies (wind energy, solar energy, geothermal energy, and hydropower).

Regarding urban planning, due to strong tropical cyclone, seismic risk, and volcanic activity, particularly in Guadeloupe, Martinique, and Réunion, the regions subsidize the construction of individual houses and collective buildings that comply with anti-seismic and anti-cyclonic standards to prevent human and environmental disasters.

Regarding water and sanitation, the regions subsidize the construction of rainwater harvesting systems. They ensure funding for major sanitation works and compliance upgrades.

Regarding natural spaces, the regions manage regional natural parks, such as, for example, the French Guiana Regional Natural Park, whose forest is considered by the scientific community to be one of the last on the globe with such high density.

===== Specific responsibilities of overseas departments =====
The environmental responsibilities of overseas departments are broadly similar to those of metropolitan French departments. They promote and may sometimes manage, for example, the remarkable natural spaces of their territories, particularly forests or marine areas, which are global biodiversity hotspots. They are responsible for implementing the departmental household and similar waste disposal plan (PDEDMA). Since the territorial collectivity "Region of Mayotte" does not exist, the Mayotte department consolidates the specific responsibilities of overseas regions and the standard responsibilities of departments with regard to the environment.

==== Overseas Collectivities ====
Overseas Collectivities (COM) have been, since the constitutional revision of 28, territories of the French Republic governed by Article 74 of the Constitution. This category includes former Overseas Territories (TOM) and other collectivities with special status.

There are five such collectivities: French Polynesia, Wallis and Futuna, Saint Pierre and Miquelon, Saint Martin, and Saint Barthélemy. These collectivities have extensive responsibilities and autonomous organization, unlike the Overseas Departments. This is also the case for environmental matters; French Polynesia: This Overseas Collectivity has a government, led by the President of French Polynesia (in 2013: Gaston Flosse), with a Minister of Ecology (in 2013: Geffry Salmon). The government of French Polynesia can submit so-called "country laws" to the Polynesian Assembly for a vote, which may allow non-compliance with the urban planning or environmental codes. In such cases, these "country laws" must be approved by the Council of State. The Polynesian Assembly thus has legislative authority, and the Polynesian government has executive authority to enact laws to promote environmental and sustainable development policies

The government of French Polynesia is responsible, in particular, for the protection of coral reefs (notably within the framework of the Initiative française pour les récifs coralliens) and terrestrial sites of the Polynesian islands. The municipalities of French Polynesia have the following mandatory responsibilities: waste treatment, sanitation, and water distribution (a significant issue, as only 10% of the collectivity's population had access to drinking water in 2007), and electricity supply. The municipalities have environmental responsibilities. Their main objectives are combating climate change and improving their carbon footprint through the increasing use of renewable energies. Numerous initiatives can be observed, such as the construction of a geothermal power plant (Tahiti) or wind turbines (Municipality of Makemo), for example. However, municipalities, lacking the means to equip themselves with sanitation or waste treatment infrastructure, for instance, may receive financial and human support from the Government of Polynesia.

===== Wallis and Futuna =====
The specificity of this collectivity in terms of responsibility distribution is that there are no municipalities. It is divided into three constituencies, each led by a King (Uvea, Alo, and Sigave), elected councilors, and State representatives. In these constituencies, the kings and their councils manage the equivalent of departmental and municipal environmental responsibilities. Environmental responsibility in this territory falls to the territorial environmental service, managed by the State in cooperation with the constituencies, tasked with ensuring and overseeing the management of the natural or artificial physical environment and improving living conditions. It defines and proposes the elements necessary for developing a coherent environmental policy. It coordinates, organizes, and utilizes studies, works, research, and conferences on the protection and enhancement of natural spaces and resources, as well as the treatment of pollution, risks, and nuisances. The constituencies are responsible for waste collection, while waste storage and treatment fall under the territorial environmental service. Water and electricity distribution are managed by the Wallis and Futuna Water and Electricity Company (EEWF), a subsidiary of GDF Suez, although infrastructure investment funding is the responsibility of the Territory.

===== Saint Pierre and Miquelon =====
The collectivity of Saint Pierre and Miquelon consists of two municipalities (Saint Pierre and Miquelon-Langlade) and a Territorial Council, with the department prioritizing sustainable development. In environmental matters, the municipalities have the same responsibilities as metropolitan municipalities, and the Territorial Council has the same responsibilities as metropolitan departments and regions. The only specificity is that the "Territorial Council" is responsible for urban planning. The collectivity is not subject to the fishing quotas of the European Union, except in cases of restrictions imposed by the State. The Territorial Council manages energy policy and finances the establishment of a wind farm on both islands and, thanks to its customs authority, enables the reduction of customs duties on the import of firewood, for example. Finally, the Council manages the protection of the coastlines and forests of the collectivity. Waste management in Saint Pierre and Miquelon falls under the responsibility of a mixed syndicate (Saint Pierre and Miquelon Waste Management Syndicate). Waste collection, however, is the responsibility of the collectivity's two municipalities

===== Saint Martin =====
The collectivity of Saint Martin has no municipalities. Thus, environmental responsibility falls to the Territorial Council, which has the same responsibilities as regions, departments, and municipalities. It therefore has responsibilities in urban planning and energy. The protection of the collectivity's ponds and lagoons is managed by the Territorial Council. Waste management is handled by the Saint Martin collectivity, but the treatment of recyclable waste is managed by a private company, VERDE SXM, while household waste is sent to a household waste landfill. Water and sanitation are managed by the Saint Martin Water and Sanitation Establishment, an autonomous public entity.

===== Saint Barthélemy =====
The collectivity of Saint Barthélemy has no municipalities. Environmental responsibility falls to the Territorial Council, which has the same responsibilities as regions, departments, and municipalities. This Council is therefore responsible for environmental matters (including the protection of wooded areas), urban planning, and waste management. It also manages waste treatment, with the collectivity operating an incineration plant. As a result, 80% of waste is energetically recovered (incinerated to supply steam to the thermal power plant that provides electricity to the entire island, as well as a desalination plant that produces drinking water for the entire island).

== See also ==
- Local authority
- Subsidiarity
- Agenda 21
