= European Centre for Nature Conservation =

Dutch non-profit foundation

ECNC - European Centre for Nature Conservation
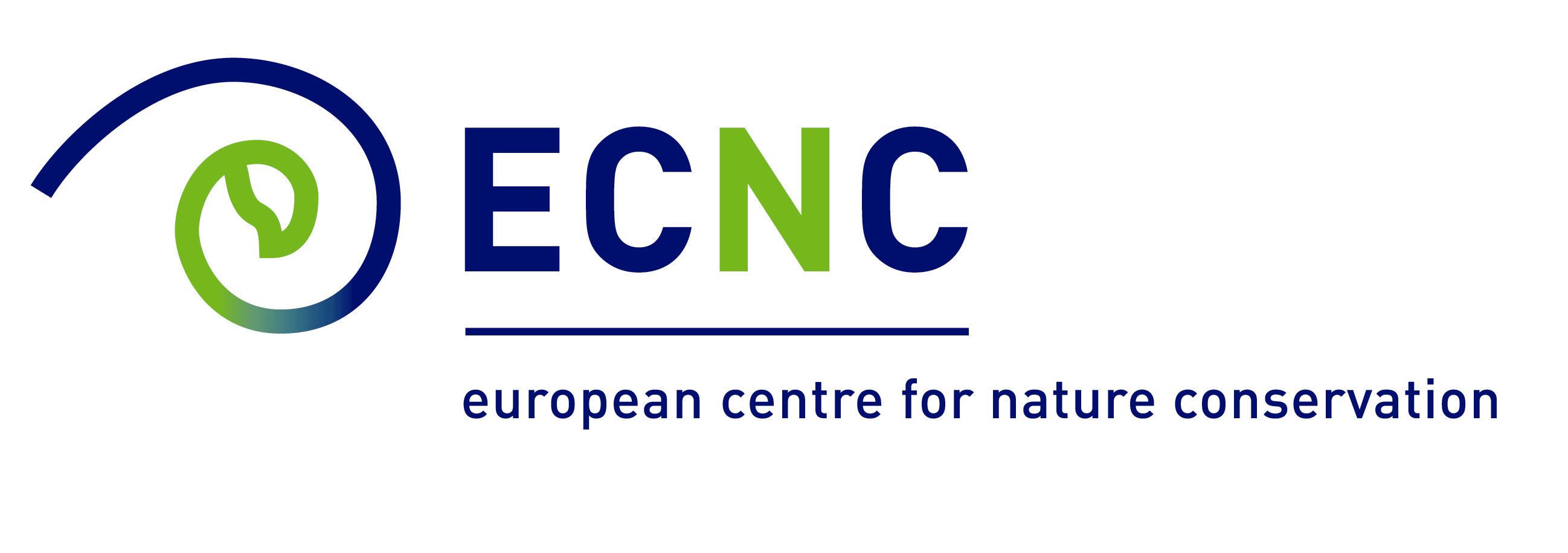
- Type: Foundation (nonprofit)
- Industry: Conservation; Sustainable use
- Founded: October 1993. Ceased operations 2017
- Headquarters: Tilburg, Netherlands

The European Centre for Nature Conservation (ECNC) was a Dutch non-profit foundation which was active in the field of European nature and biodiversity policy between 1993 and 2017. It was set up as a network of university departments, expert centres and government agencies and operated as a European biodiversity expertise centre. The organization promoted sustainable management of natural resources and biodiversity, and aimed to stimulate interaction between science, society and policy.

Main areas of work were ecological networks, biodiversity assessment and monitoring, and stakeholder involvement. ECNC worked with and for the Council of Europe, UNEP and the European Environment Agency.

== Establishment and mission ==
The European Centre for Nature Conservation was officially launched in 1993 by the then State Secretary for Agriculture, Nature and Food Quality of the Netherlands, J. Dzsingisz Gabor, at the conference "Conserving Europe's Natural Heritage – towards a European Ecological Network" in Maastricht. ECNC aimed to promote an integrated approach to management of natural resources and biodiversity, and stimulated interaction between science, society and policy. It was set up as a network of university departments, expert centres and government agencies.

ECNC projects focused on:

- relationship between nature and people;
- business and biodiversity;
- green infrastructure and ecological connectivity
- monitoring biodiversity and ecosystem services;
- international and European policies
- regional and local approaches;
- natural processes and the role that species play at the landscape scale.

ECNC developed projects throughout Europe, with a focus on Central and Eastern Europe. It worked for, or in partnership with, a number of intergovernmental and international organisations, including the Council of Europe, UNEP, European Commission, European Environment Agency, and the European Bank for Reconstruction and Development. ECNC ceased operations in October 2017.

== Key projects and partnerships ==
ECNC led the drafting group of the Pan-European Biological and Landscape Diversity Strategy (PEBLDS). The PEBLDS (1994) was the European response to support the implementation of the Convention on Biological Diversity; it was developed by the Council of Europe and the UNEP Regional office for Europe. ECNC remained involved with the implementation of the PEBLDS, in particular the establishment of the Pan-European Ecological Network (PEEN) which was one of its prime objectives. ECNC managed the joint secretariat of the PEEN Expert Committee together with the Council of Europe and coordinated the process of developing the indicative maps of the Pan-European Ecological Networks in various parts of Europe. In later years, the emphasis of ECNC's work switched towards the wider area of green infrastructure.

ECNC was a consortium member of the European Environment Agency's Topic Centre on Biodiversity, especially contributing to biodiversity assessment and reporting. The organisation also participated in the EU Coordination Group on Biodiversity and Nature and worked for the European Commission's DG Environment to support the Natura 2000 process.

In cooperation with the Council of Europe and IUCN, ECNC developed capacity building programmes on stakeholder involvement and communication in support of nature conservation. The organisation worked with international financial institutions such as the European Bank for Reconstruction and Development to integrate considerations for the sustainable management of biodiversity in their decision making.

== Organisation ==
ECNC was a non-profit foundation under Dutch law. Its organisational structure consisted of:

- Board - providing leadership and legitimacy to ECNC's operations.
- Scientific Council - advising on the quality of ECNC's activities.
- Network of 51 partners in 27 European countries, consisting of university departments, expert centres and government agencies, that had signed a Memorandum of Cooperation
- Secretariat - with approximately 15 staff members.

The secretariat was located in Tilburg, the Netherlands. The organization at different points in time had regional offices in Budapest, Hungary and Kleve, Germany.

As of 2009, ECNC worked with a number of other organizations under the name "ECNC Group". The members of the ECNC Group were ECNC, the Coastal & Marine Union (EUCC) and Centro Mediterráneo EUCC. The Large Herbivore Foundation joined the ECNC Group in July 2010. EuroNatur, the NatureBureau and EECONET Action Fund were observers. The ECNC Group consisted of two units: 'Biodiversity and Nature' (ECNC) and 'Coastal and Marine' (EUCC).

== Publications (selection) ==
- Nature works for regions! 2012. ISBN 978-90-76762-31-9
- Local biodiversity action planning for Southeastern Europe. 2010. ISBN 978-90-76762-30-2
- BioScore : a tool to assess the impacts of European Community policies on Europe's biodiversity. 2009. ISBN 978-90-76762-28-9
- Changing climate, changing biodiversity in South-East Europe : proceedings of the conference, Belgrade, 18–19 June 2008. 2008. ISBN 978-90-76762-24-1
- Sobio : social science and biodiversity : why is it important? : a guide for policymakers. 2006. ISBN 90-76762-18-X, 978-90-76762-18-0
- Indicative map of the Pan-European ecological network in South-Eastern Europe : technical background document. 2006. ISBN 90-76762-21-X, 978-90-76762-21-0
- BIOfACT : assessing the factors that affect farmers' willingness and ability to cooperate with biodiversity policies. 2004. ISBN 90-76762-19-8
- Indicative map of the Pan-European ecological network for Central en Eastern Europe. Technical background document. 2002. ISBN 90-76762-13-9
- Financing nature conservation : EU programmes and instruments for Central and East European Accession Countries. 2000. ISBN 90-76762-07-4
- The face of Europe : policy perspectives for European landscapes. 2000. ISBN 90-76762-08-2
- Agri-environmental indicators for sustainable agriculture in Europe. 2000. ISBN 90-76762-02-3
- Corridors of the Pan-European Ecological Network : concepts and examples for terrestrial and freshwater vertebrates. 2000.ISBN 90-76762-05-8
- Communicating nature conservation : a manual on using communication in support of nature conservation policy and action. 2000. ISBN 90-802482-9-0
- Globalisation, ecology and economy- bridging worlds : proceedings of the European Conference "Globalisation, ecology and economy- bridging worlds" Tilburg, 24-26 november 1999. 1999. ISBN 90-76762-04-X
- Establishing Natura 2000 in EU accession countries : proceedings. 1999. ISBN 90-802482-8-2
- The green backbone of Central and Eastern Europe : conference proceedings, Cracow, 25–27 February. 1998.< ISBN 90-802482-5-8<
- Facts & figures on Europe's biodiversity : state and trends 1998-1999. 1998. 90-802482-7-4
- Innovative financing opportunities for European biodiversity : towards implementing the Pan-European biological and landscape diversity strategy. 1998. ISBN 90-802482-6-6
- Perspectives on ecological networks. 1996. ISBN 90-802482-3-1
