= Coastal & Marine Union (EUCC) =

International nonprofit organization

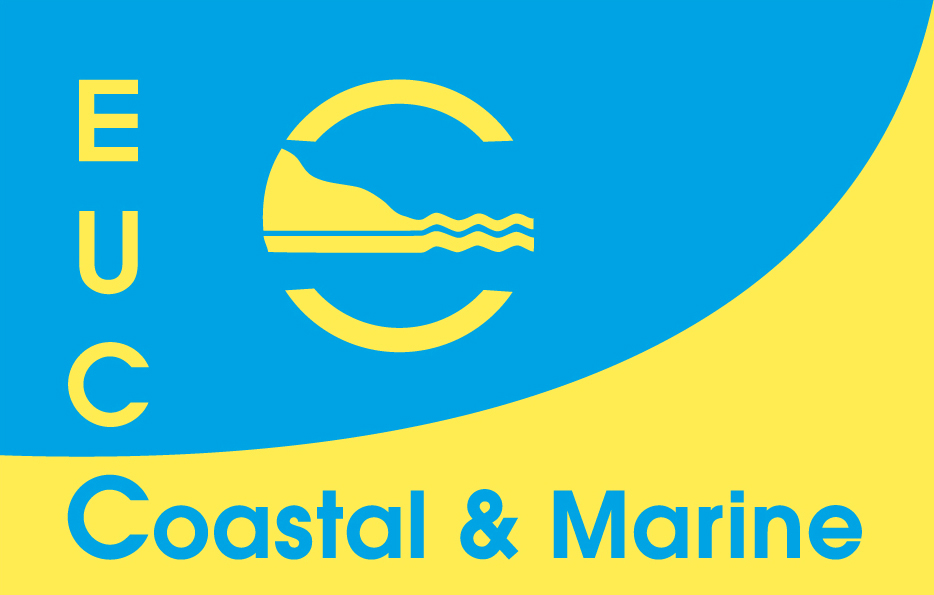
- VAT ID no.: NL 8043.36.192.B01
- Registration no.: 40447714
- Purpose: Environmental
- Location: Leiden, Netherlands
- Origins: European Dune Symposium in Leiden, Netherlands (1987)
- Region served: Four European regional seas
- Members: 500 full right members, 2700 network members
- Website: www.eucc.net
- Formerly called: European Union for Dune Conservation (EUDC), European Union for Coastal Conservation (EUCC), EUCC – The Coastal Union

Coastal & Marine Union (EUCC) is a nonprofit organization. It was founded in 1989 with the aim of promoting coastal management. In Europe, it had 13 national branches. EUCC's working area is Europe and its neighbouring regions, especially the Black Sea and the Mediterranean.

The organisation has strategic partners and alliances, including the ECNC Group, IUCN, EECONET Action Fund, and European Habitats Forum. EUCC has observer status in the OSPAR and HELCOM regional conventions.

== History ==
At the occasion of the 10th anniversary of the Dutch dune conservation foundation (Stichting Duinbehoud), the 1st European Dune Conference was organized in September 1987 in Leiden, Netherlands, to discuss conservation management. As a result of this conference, the European Union for Dune Conservation & Coastal management (EUDC) was formally founded on 6 January 1989 as an association under Dutch law.

The association then changed its name to European Union for Coastal Conservation in 1991 at the 3rd International Conference in Galway, Ireland. Since then, the abbreviation has been kept. The organisation contributed to the Pan-European Biological and Landscape Diversity Strategy (PEBLDS); it was adopted in 1995 by the Environment for Europe Ministers Conference. Later on, under the auspices of UNEP and the Council of Europe, the EUCC led the elaboration of the European Coastal & Marine Ecological Network (ECMEN) and the European Code of Conduct for Coastal Zones. The latter was officially adopted by the Council of Europe Ministers in 1999.

When the European Union was established in 1993, the organization started identifying problems of misinterpretations of its name and resolved to change it to EUCC – The Coastal Union in 2001. EUCC's main field of work was the promotion of integrated coastal zone management in Europe. EUCC participated in the UNEP ICZM Conference of 1998 in Saint Petersburg, Russia, which recommended the programme be launched for Central and Eastern Europe and Central Asia.

EUCC took the lead to organise, in conjunction with UNEP's PAP/RAC, the first intergovernmental ICZM meeting in Croatia in June 2000, bringing together representatives from 18 non-EU coastal states and from the Regional Seas Programmes for the Eastern Mediterranean, Baltic, Caspian and Black Seas areas. By the European Commission Recommendation on ICZM in 2002, EUCC entered the Working Group on Indicators and Data. The organization changed its name in 2009 to the current Coastal & Marine Union. The ECNC Group consists of two units: Biodiversity and Nature (ECNC) and Coastal and Marine (EUCC). The members of the ECNC Group are ECNC-European Centre for Nature Conservation, the Coastal & Marine Union (EUCC) and Centro Mediterráneo EUCC. Euronatur, the NatureBureau and the EECONET Action Fund are observers of the ECNC Group.

=== EUCC's presidents ===
| Time period | Name |
|---|---|
| 1989–1994 | Helias A. Udo de Haes |
| 1994–1996 | Paolo Fabbri |
| 1996–2000 | J. Pat Doody |
| 2000–2010 | David R. Green |
| 2010–2012 | Johan Vande Lanotte |
| 2012–2014 | Hendrik Oosterveld |
| 2014–2020 | Gerald Schernewski |
| 2020-Present | Natasha Bradshaw |

== Activities ==
=== Conferences ===
EUCC has been organizing biannual conferences since 1987. Until 1999, the conference was organized by EUCC under the name "Coastlines", and later on, it joined forces with Eurocoast, thus creating the Littoral conferences in 2002.

| Year | Venue | Conference theme |
|---|---|---|
| 1987 | Leiden, Netherlands | Perspectives in coastal dune management: towards a dynamic approach |
| 1989 | Seville, Spain | The ecology and conservation of European Dunes |
| 1991 | Galway, Ireland | Coastal Dunes |
| 1993 | Marathon, Greece | Coastal Management and Habitat Conservation |
| 1995 | Swansea, Wales (UK) | Directions in European Coastal Management |
| 1997 | Naples, Italy | Coastal Environment Management |
| 1999 | Międzyzdroje, Poland | Connecting science and management in the coastal zone |
| 2002 | Porto, Portugal | The Changing Coast |
| 2004 | Aberdeen, Scotland (UK) | Delivering sustainable coasts: connecting science and policy |
| 2006 | Gdansk, Poland | Coastal Innovations and Initiatives |
| 2008 | Venice, Italy | A Changing Coast: Challenge for the Environmental Policies |
| 2010 | London, England (UK) | Adapting to global change at the coast: Leadership, Innovation, and Investment |
| 2012 | Oostende, Belgium | Coasts of tomorrow |
| 2014 | Klaipeda, Lithuania | Facing Present and Future Coast Challenges |
| 2016 | Biarritz, France | The changing littoral. Anticipation and adaptation to climate change |
| 2017 | Liverpool, UK | Change, naturalness and people |

=== Publications ===
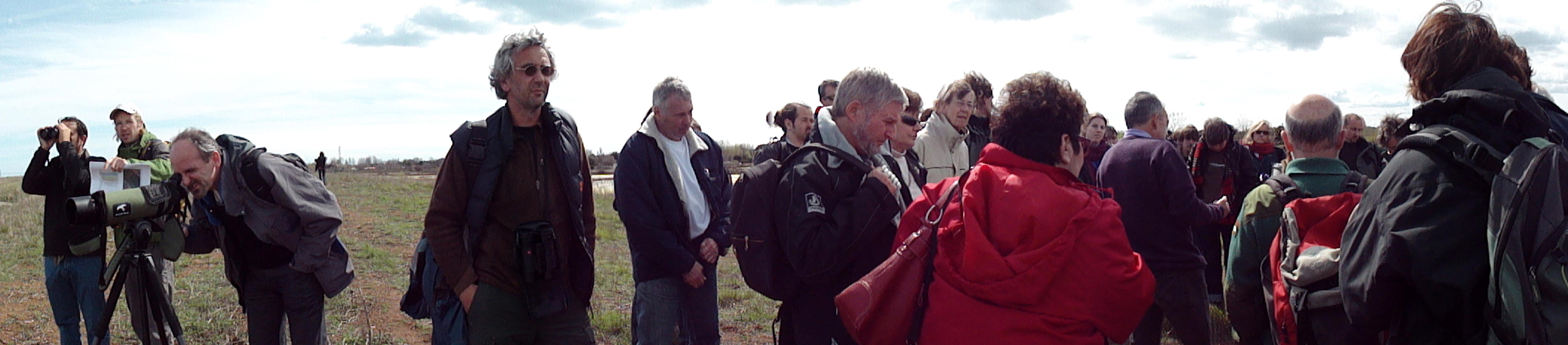
EUCC's workshop in Sète, France

Inspired by Roland Paskoff, EUCC-France started to organise a series of workshops throughout the French territory, two each year. After 15 years, the book Les ateliers d’EUCC-France. De la connaissance des systèmes littoraux à la gestion intégrée des zones côtières was published gathering these experiences. An official scientific organ of the EUCC was created in 1994. The Journal of Coastal Conservation was published by Springer. EUCC also publishes the quarterly magazine Coastal & Marine. EUCC has been one of the initiators of the ENCORA European network of coastal management networks and the Coastal Wiki, an internet-based encyclopedia.

=== Policy development ===
The EUCC prepared the Pan-European Biological and Landscape Diversity Strategy (PEBLDS); it was adopted in 1995, and the European Code of Conduct for Coastal Zones was adopted by the Council of Europe Ministers in 1999. The 1st European Coastal Conservation Conference 1991, organised by the EUCC and the Dutch government, was the start of the development of integrated coastal zone management (ICZM) as a policy approach. It led to the EC Demonstration Programme and to the adoption of the European Council and Parliament Recommendation on ICZM in 2002.

The international Secretariat and the Mediterranean Centre lead the partnership on ICZM. EUCC-Germany has a similar tool, IKZM-D Lernen. The company has co-produced the Climate of Coastal Cooperation initiative. EUCC has set up an award and certification programme, "QualityCoast".

=== Projects ===
The company has protected c. 4000 ha of wetlands, forest and lagoon waters at the Polish part of the Szczecin Lagoon. EUCC Poland is the owner of c. 1000 ha, while the rest belongs to the Forestry and Maritime offices and some private owners. In Morocco, following the project CAP Nador in the province of Nador, a complementary project, ABIPA C3F, planted fruit trees in an 18.6 ha area in Cap des Trois Fourches. In the North Sea, EUCC had worked to stabilize the subtidal and intertidal mussel beds in the Wadden Sea through the Mosselwad project. In the Black Sea, a project in Bulgaria and Romania allowed listing priority regions marine protected areas designation.
