= Public inquiry in France =

Formal public consultation procedure in France

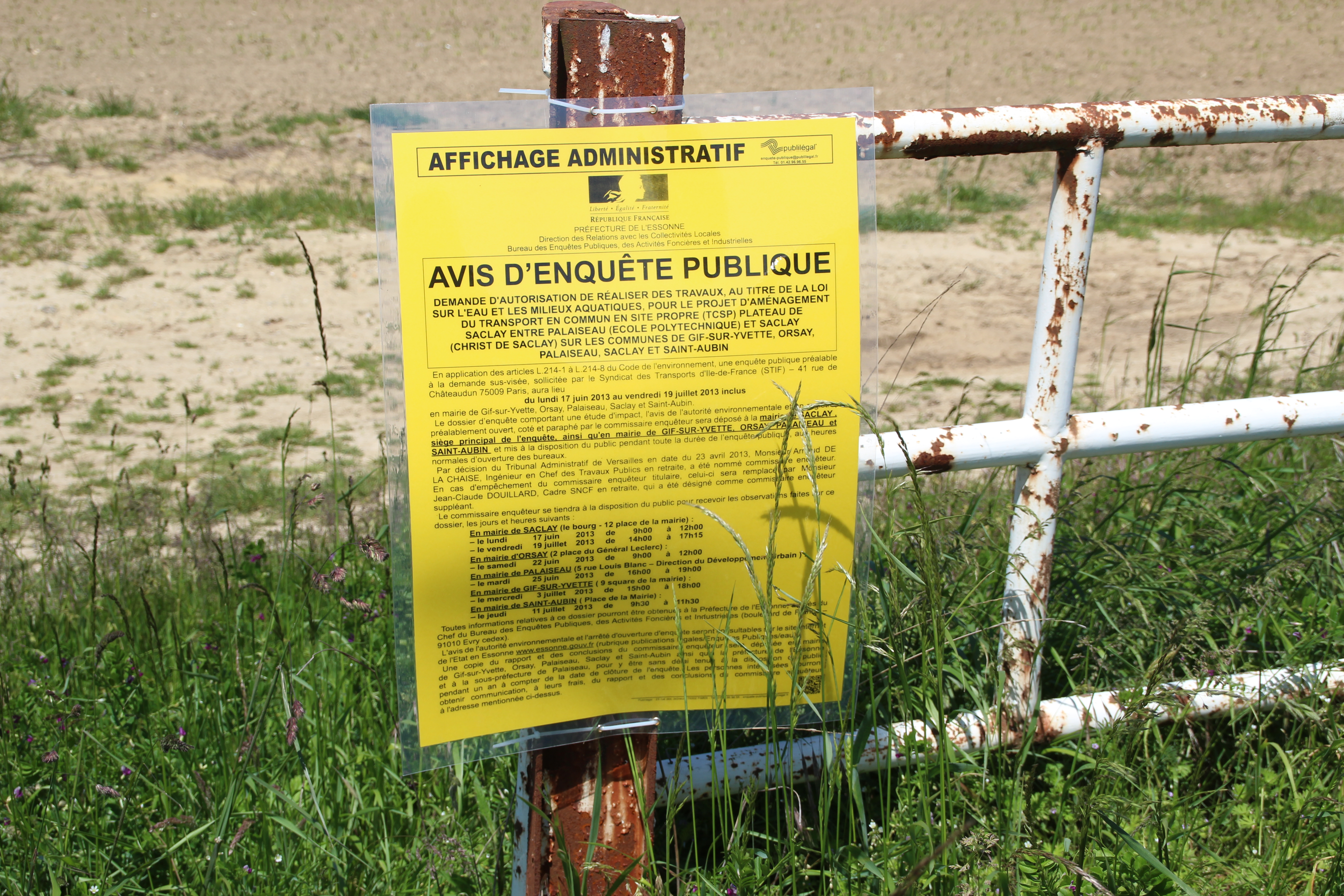
Public inquiry notice in 2013 on the Saclay Plateau

In France, a public inquiry (enquête publique) is a formal public consultation procedure. concerning a finalized dossier (project, plan or programme) that is sufficiently formalized in principle to be subject to environmental assessment, of which the public inquiry is a part. It involves, on the one hand, a dual obligation to provide prior information on the existence of the project and its content and, on the other hand, a register (paper / electronic) allowing the public to record their comments, which is open for a minimum period determined by law. The inquiry is conducted by an independent and impartial third party, the investigating commissioner. The prior publicity formalities are organised by the administrative authority empowered to rule on the case (usually the prefect, sometimes the mayor, or the president of a public establishment of intercommunal cooperation (EPCI), depending on the potential impacts of the project) to complete the information before the decision is made.

The public inquiry is therefore a mechanism that serves participatory democracy. It is therefore:

- open to all, without restriction of age or nationality; anyone can find out about the project, consult the relevant file, and express their opinion, suggestions, and any counterproposals in an appropriate survey register (paper and/or electronic);
- open locally, in and around the affected areas, in the town hall(s) concerned by the project; to this end, a minimum level of publicity is regulated;
- open in its file submitted for inquiry, in accordance with the rules specified in the inquiry;
- conducted by an investigating commissioner, or by an inquiry commission (an odd number of investigating commissioners with a commission chair) for complex inquiries, independent and a priori impartial;
- open in its conclusions: the report and opinion of the investigating commissioner or commission of inquiry are made available to the public, in particular on the website of the authority organizing the inquiry (prefecture/town hall), except in exceptional cases where access is limited to those who submit a written request (in cases of expropriation).

== History ==
Public inquiry poster concerning the location of the Tarare abattoir (Rhône), 1868

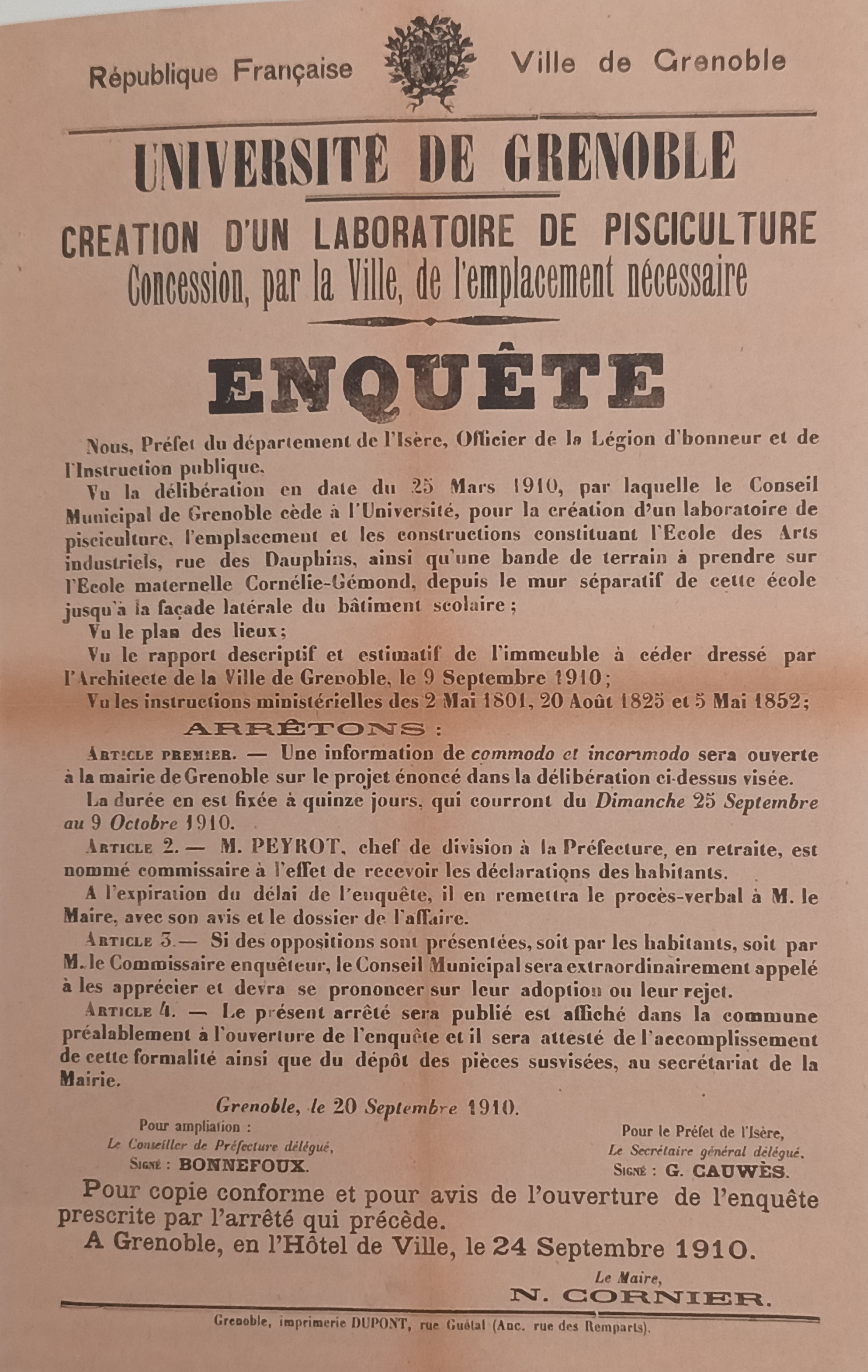
Public inquiry poster in Grenoble, 24 September 1910

A provision with constitutional value, Article 17 of the 1789 Declaration of the Rights of Man and of the Citizen, proclaims that:

"Property being an inviolable and sacred right, no one may be deprived of it, except when public necessity, legally ascertained, clearly requires it, and under the condition of a just and prior indemnity."

To legalize the declaration of public necessity, the first basis for the French public inquiry system was an imperial law of 1810 passed to guarantee respect for property rights during expropriations. The royal ordinance of May 1829 extended the measure to include a preliminary inquiry with the submission of the project in simplified form, with universal access and the collection of comments. The ordinance of February 28, 1831 required public works to undergo such a preliminary inquiry with a commission of inquiry, comment registers open for at least one month, and the commission's conclusions. A law passed in 1833 requires this preliminary inquiry (then called commodo et incommodo) for the Declaration of public utility (DUP).

A 1958 ordinance requires the inquiry and a favourable opinion before a DUP is issued. A 1959 decree, revised in 1977, specifies the characteristics of the preliminary inquiry before the DUP, intending to defend the rights of property owners before validating the administration projects. A 2014 ordinance amended this regulation in Sections L110-1 and L112-1 and R112-1 to −24 of the Code of Expropriation for Public Utility. This inquiry, known as a "public utility inquiry," therefore formed the historical basis for public inquiries in France. It is now only a minority special case among public inquiries. It is opened and organized by the prefect of the department, and its conclusions are communicated to interested parties only upon request.

The 1983 law, known as the "Bouchardeau" law, relating to the democratization of public inquiries and environmental protection, imposed a system for informing and gathering public opinion to ensure that public and general interests were better taken into account. Its implementing decrees were signed on April 23, 1985 , and had a fairly broad scope. They were then transposed into the Environmental Code. In 1985, an initial European Union directive on the assessment of the effects of certain public and private projects on the environment required Member States to ensure "that the public concerned is allowed to express its opinion before the project is started". Amending directives were adopted to supplement it in 1997 and 2011. A 2010 law harmonized the various types of public inquiries with those of the Environmental Code, while ensuring compliance with various international legal texts. A decree issued in 2011 reformed this procedure: the scope of application was revised, the content of the investigation file was clarified, and the investigation procedure was rewritten. An order issued in 2016, followed by a decree issued in 2017, revised its scope and many elements of its procedure and process (e.g. appointment of the investigating commissioner, duration, digitization of the file submitted for investigation, the register, etc.). The entire public inquiry procedure is now contained in Articles L123-1 to −18 and R123-1 to −27 of the Environmental Code. For environmental permits, a law passed in 2023 added a procedure to speed up the review process, followed by an implementing decree in 2024.

Since the end of 2015, the few public inquiries that do not fall under either the code governing expropriation for public use or the environmental code have been regulated by Sections L134-1 to −2, L134-31 to −34 and R134-3 to −30 of the Code of Relations between the Public and the Administration and are organized by the prefect.

Over the years, public participation in projects affecting their environment has grown; local government officials are taking participatory approaches and encouraging citizens to participate in their communities' projects. Investigating commissioners, who hold a judicial mandate, facilitate this participation and ensure the security of environmental assessment procedures, and administrative courts are often called upon by local authorities to carry out this task.

== Types of public inquiry ==
In France, starting in 2016, public inquiries tended to be classified into three main categories: environmental inquiries, public utility inquiries, and other inquiries. This classification is now obsolete: the Environmental Code. The “Environmental Code applies to most "construction, engineering, or development projects requiring an environmental assessment or requiring environmental authorization linked to another investigation requirement. This concerns two-thirds of public inquiries:

- "aims to ensure public information and participation, as well as the consideration of third-party interests when making decisions that may affect the environment" most often at a local level but sometimes at a national level;
- is open to the public for at least 30 days;
- is conducted by an investigating commissioner appointed by the president of the administrative court with jurisdiction over the area concerned;
- also applies to:
  - numerous collective urban planning documents: SCot, PLU and PLUi, municipal map;
  - declarations of public utility likely to affect the environment;
  - risk prevention plans, PPRN or PPRT.

The public inquiry is a legal part of the process of assessing a project's environmental impact and public participation in the decision-making process. It may incorporate other procedures:

- Consultation procedure and public participation by electronic, means with or without an investigating commissioner; in this case, there will only be a prefectural summary of the comments and proposals submitted.
- With an investigating commissioner, the consultation period lasts three months, with two public meetings and an investigating commissioner, and a full report and reasoned conclusions.

The public inquiry may concern a declaration of public interest, a project for a facility classified for environmental protection, a structure relating to water and aquatic environments, and may be subject to special provisions where applicable.

It is mandatory for projects of public interest, such as those requiring expropriation following a declaration of public utility, or those requiring the establishment of public utility easements, particularly for urban planning purposes.

Investigations before a declaration of public utility, most often with a view to expropriation, or before the creation of a public utility easement, are conducted on this basis alone if there is no environmental impact.

The so-called public utility inquiry, which concerns approximately one quarter of public inquiries, may be open to the public for only 15 days. The parcel inquiry, which is restricted to the owners of the parcels concerned (list of owners, individual notification, and Art. R131-8 of the Code of Expropriation for Public Utility), falls outside the scope of the public inquiry proper. Others may have a limited scope, such as departmental or municipal roads or rural paths.

- The comments and proposals collected during the inquiry are taken into consideration by the administration in its decision

== Characteristics ==
=== Purpose ===
The Environmental Code reiterates the principles that, on the one hand, "everyone has the right to access information relating to the environment held by public authorities" and, on the other hand, "everyone shall be informed of draft public decisions affecting the environment in such a way as to enable them to submit their comments, which shall be taken into consideration by the competent authority." The Charter for the Environment specifies that it is the duty of every citizen to protect their environment.

Public inquiries are one of the means used to ensure the public participation necessary for the development of certain public decisions, with the aim of "improving the quality of public decision-making and contributing to its democratic legitimacy.” . They are therefore legally required before any administrative decision that may affect either private property, particularly in the case of expropriation, or the environment. Its purpose is, respectively, to formally establish public utility before expropriation by means of a declaration of public utility or "to ensure public information and participation and to take into account the interests of third parties" so that "the comments and proposals received during the inquiry period" are "taken into consideration by the project owner and by the authority competent to make the decision.”

It was conducted before decision-making and in a relatively impartial manner, the public inquiry therefore aims to,:

- inform the public, "raise awareness and educate them about environmental protection";
- gather opinions, suggestions, and possible counterproposals based on a reasoned presentation of the issues and, in some cases, an impact study;
- take into account the interests of third parties;
- expand the information available to decision-makers and competent authorities before they make their decision, in particular to better ensure the proportionality of conservation, restoration, or, where applicable, compensation measures;
- better assess and limit the impacts of projects deemed to be of economic, social, or environmental interest, whether at the local (e.g., local urban planning), regional (e.g., redevelopment of a major road), or national level (e.g., widening of a river, decommissioning of a nuclear power plant, etc.).

=== Fields of application ===
In France, a public inquiry must precede the implementation of:

- all projects requiring expropriation justified by public interest and declared following a declaration of public utility. For example: road, rail, or air transport infrastructure projects, land or underwater quarries, land consolidation, work on private land approved by a declaration of public interest;
- new public utility easements;
- projects involving works, structures, or developments carried out by public or private entities that require an impact assessment, except for projects to create a concerted development zone" or that require environmental authorization. For example: certain works in rivers (e.g., creation of a dike, hydroelectric project) or in estuaries or on the coast, littoral zone rainwater or wastewater discharges, wastewater treatment plants, drilling (for irrigation, geothermal energy, etc.), facilities classified for environmental protection (ICPE), major developments, etc.;
- projects to create a national park or marine nature reserve, draft charters for national parks or regional nature reserves, projects to register or classify sites, and projects to classify sites as nature reserves;
- plans, diagrams, programs, and other planning documents" relating to urban planning "subject to environmental assessment ", such as the local urban planning plan, (PLU), the urban transport plan(PDU), municipal maps, territorial guidelines for sustainable development and planning (DTADD), development plans (regional ecological coherence plan (SRCE), territorial coherence plan (SCoT)), noise exposure plan (around major airports), local inter-municipal advertising regulations (RLPI), etc.

Certain projects, particularly those relating to national defense, or those carried out due to a serious and immediate danger, are subject to legal exemptions from these procedures.

When a public debate is organized in advance on a major project (e.g., highway, decommissioning of a nuclear power plant, etc.), the minutes and summary of the debate must be included in the public inquiry file. In this case, the State must launch the public inquiry within five years of the publication of the minutes and summary of the public debate.

=== File submitted for investigation ===
The file submitted for investigation consists of various documents,,:

- explanatory documents: presentation note, impact study, impact report, mandatory opinions, reference to the texts governing the public inquiry and the decision(s) that may be adopted at the end of the inquiry, the authorities competent to take the decision(s) that may be adopted at the end of the inquiry, the main characteristics of the most important structures, etc.),
- graphic documents: location plan, general plan of the works, etc.

In addition, there is an inquiry register for receiving comments from the public. These documents are available to the public in all locations (town hall(s)) where the inquiry is officially open, in paper format and optionally in electronic format (on a website),.

=== Stages ===
The main stages of the public inquiry process are:

Before it begins:

- Planning of the project by the petitioner and/or the competent authorities (Mayor, Prefect, with the relevant departments (D.D.T., D.R.E.A.L., etc.));
- Finalization of an administrative and technical file supported by an explanatory note, descriptive elements of the proposed decision (e.g., arguments, elements to be "brought to attention," plans (site plans, parcel plans in the event of expropriation, etc.), maps, environmental impact study, etc., in the forms provided for in each case;
- Compilation of opinions required by regulations;
- Appointment of an investigating commissioner or commission of inquiry from an annual departmental list of individuals qualified for the role;
- Decision to open an inquiry, most often by prefectural decree, rarely by municipal decree, after consultation with the investigating commissioner, particularly regarding the opening and closing dates and the dates and locations where the investigating commissioner(s) will be present.
- Initial publicity: legal notice in the local press, posted in the town hall, prefecture, and possibly on site; The legal notice shall name the signing authority, the investigating commissioner, the subject of the investigation, the dates of the investigation, the dates, times, and locations for consulting the file, the website for consulting the file, and the email address for submitting comments. The dates on which the investigating commissioner is available to meet with the public, the specific conditions for expressing different opinions, and the options for consulting the investigating commissioner's report.

When the public consultation opens:

- For a minimum of 15 consecutive days, but 30 days for investigations affecting the environment, during normal opening hours, the public may visit the town halls where the investigation is being conducted, consult the paper version of the file, and note their comments in a register made available to them; They may also write (by mail) to the town hall for the attention of the investigating commissioner; In most cases, they may also send an email to a dedicated email address (electronic register);
- The investigating commissioner:
  - provides on-call services (generally 3 to 5) in the relevant town hall(s) in accordance with the information provided in the notice and/or in the regulatory notice published in the press to allow the public to express their views orally;
  - may hold one or more public information and discussion meetings.

After the public inquiry has closed:

- At the end of the public consultation period, the investigating commissioner closes the investigation register(s) (paper format) and quickly collects any information from the authorities that he or she deems necessary;
- The investigating commissioner generally has one month to draft his report, which describes the conduct of the investigation, analyzes all the comments received, and must include REASONED conclusions;
- The investigating commissioner then submits his report to the authority that organized the inquiry and to the president of the administrative court. This report and the conclusions are made public and are available for consultation at the prefecture and town hall(s), for one year after the investigation is closed, except in public utility investigations, where these conclusions are communicated, upon request, to the persons concerned,
- After receiving the opinion of the investigating commissioner, the CODERST or CDNPS, as applicable, issues its own (advisory) opinion. In addition to the mandatory opinion of the environmental authority (IGEDD-MRAE), these opinions are not binding on the prefect but contribute to the prefect's final decision to grant or refuse authorization. The arguments and opinion of the investigating commissioner may be used by the administrative court if it is seized against the implementation of the project within the regulatory time limits (two months in 2018) following the posting of the decision.

== Difficulties ==
The commissioner or commission of inquiry is appointed by the president of the administrative court before the opening of the public inquiry (Sections L123-4 and R123-5 of the Environment Code). Once appointed, usually two to three months before the start of the inquiry, the commissioner or commission begins its investigations and may request the necessary documents from the petitioner or the organizing authority to prepare the information for the public. These preliminary investigations are often difficult because feasibility and impact studies are complex and often carried out by multiple parties involved in the environmental impact assessment. Impact studies are difficult to carry out because they cover many areas governed by laws and regulations (AIR, WATER, SOIL, SUB-SOIL, WILD FAUNA AND FLORA, LANDSCAPES, NEIGHBORHOOD CONVENIENCE, RATIONAL USE OF ENERGY). Its role, which is not very visible before the public inquiry is opened, requires investigating the project to fully assess the issues and impacts on the environment. In practice, petitioners or communities organizing inquiries may tend to limit access to information on sensitive projects, which can sometimes complicate the exercise of their missions.

== See also ==
- Public consultation
- Environmental law
- Environmental impact assessment
