= Roland Paskoff =

French geomorphologist

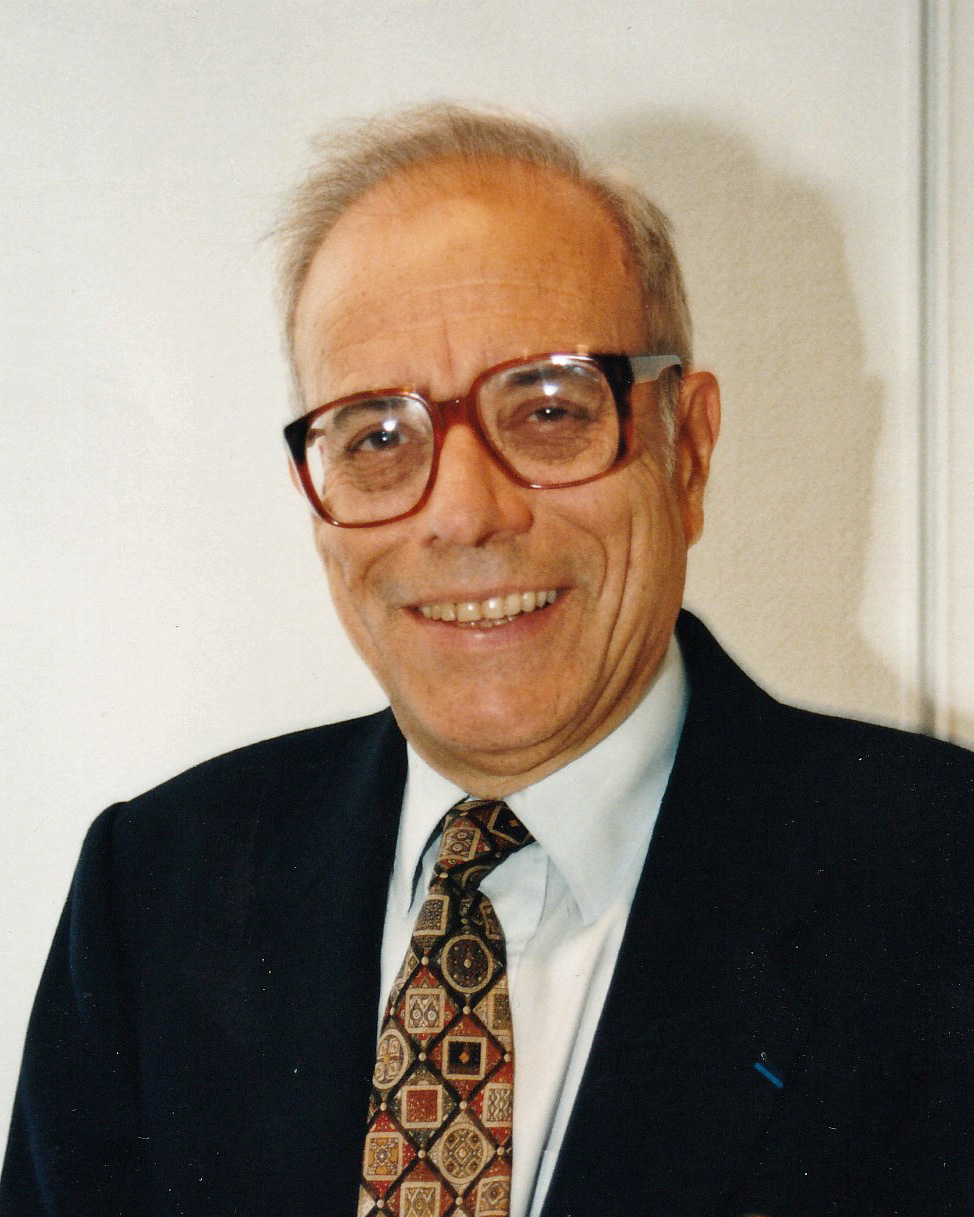
- Paskoff in 1997
- Born: 20 March 1933; Oujda, Morocco
- Died: 14 September 2005 (aged 72); France
- Citizenship: France
- Education: University of Bordeaux
- Known for: Coastal geomorphology
- Scientific career
- Fields: Geomorphology
- Workplaces: University of Chile; Tunis University; University of Lyon

Roland Paskoff (20 March 1933 – 14 September 2005) was a French geologist expert in coastal geomorphology including Holocene tectonics and sea level change. While he was active studying the coast of the countries where he held university positions—that is Chile, France and Tunisia— he also conducted studies in Bahrain, Malta, the Seychelles and the Mascarene Islands.
