= Schéma directeur d'aménagement et de gestion des eaux =

In France, the schéma directeur d'aménagement et de gestion des eaux (SDAGE) is a document that aims to put into effect the principles of the law of 3 January 1992 on the level of the major hydrographic basins. In translation, its name is outline for the organization of the development and management of water resources.

== Rationale ==
Water is a part of the nation's common heritage. Its protection, exploitation and setting into a usable state while respecting natural balances, is of general interest.

The use of water belongs to all, within the framework of laws and regulations as well as of rights already established.

== The law ==
The main subjects addressed by the SDAGE are written into the law:

- preservation of aquatic ecosystems, their sites and wetlands,
- protection against any pollution and restoration of the quality of the water,
- development and protection of the resource as drinking water
- exploitation of water as an economic resource and sharing that resource.

The SDAGE scheme was drawn up together by the national, regional and département governments and is managed by the agence de l'eau (water agency).

== How it works ==
The SDAGE serves as a general framework for the development and management of the water of each hydrographic unit, system or aquifer). These are the schémas d'aménagement et de gestion des eaux (SAGE), that is water resource development and management outlines.

The aquifer and the hydro-electric and recreational uses of water in the Ain valley compose a clear example of a site where a coordinated approach could be productive. However, the schéma is flexible enough to include specific needs as for example, that of Artois-Picardy, which is concerned specifically with the former mining basin of the Nord and Pas-de-Calais départements and the consequences of past and current exploitation of the région's coal.
