= European green infrastructure =

EU strategy for biodiversity

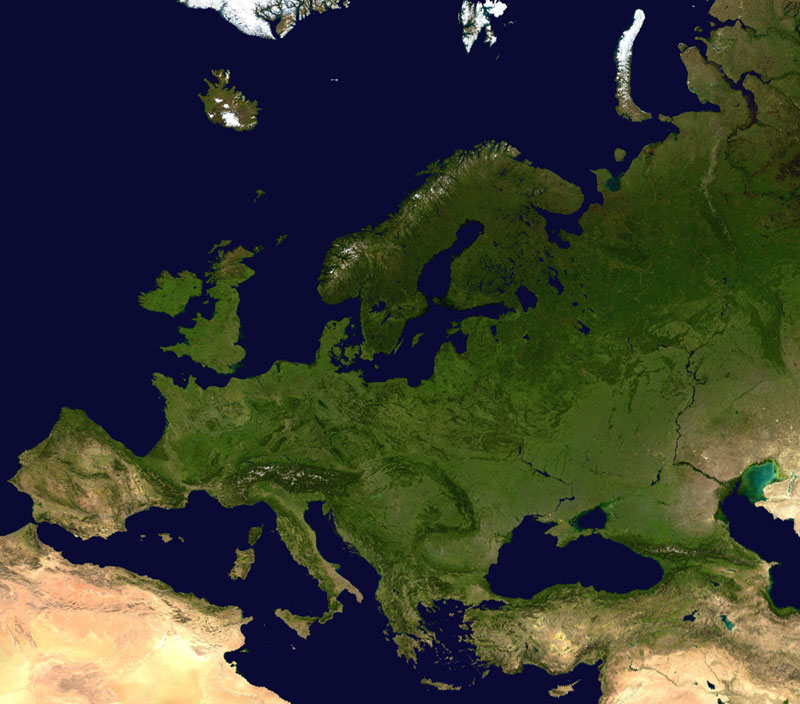
The ecological network beyond the borders. To better reflect the migratory species (fish, marine mammals, birds, etc..), It is called "pan".

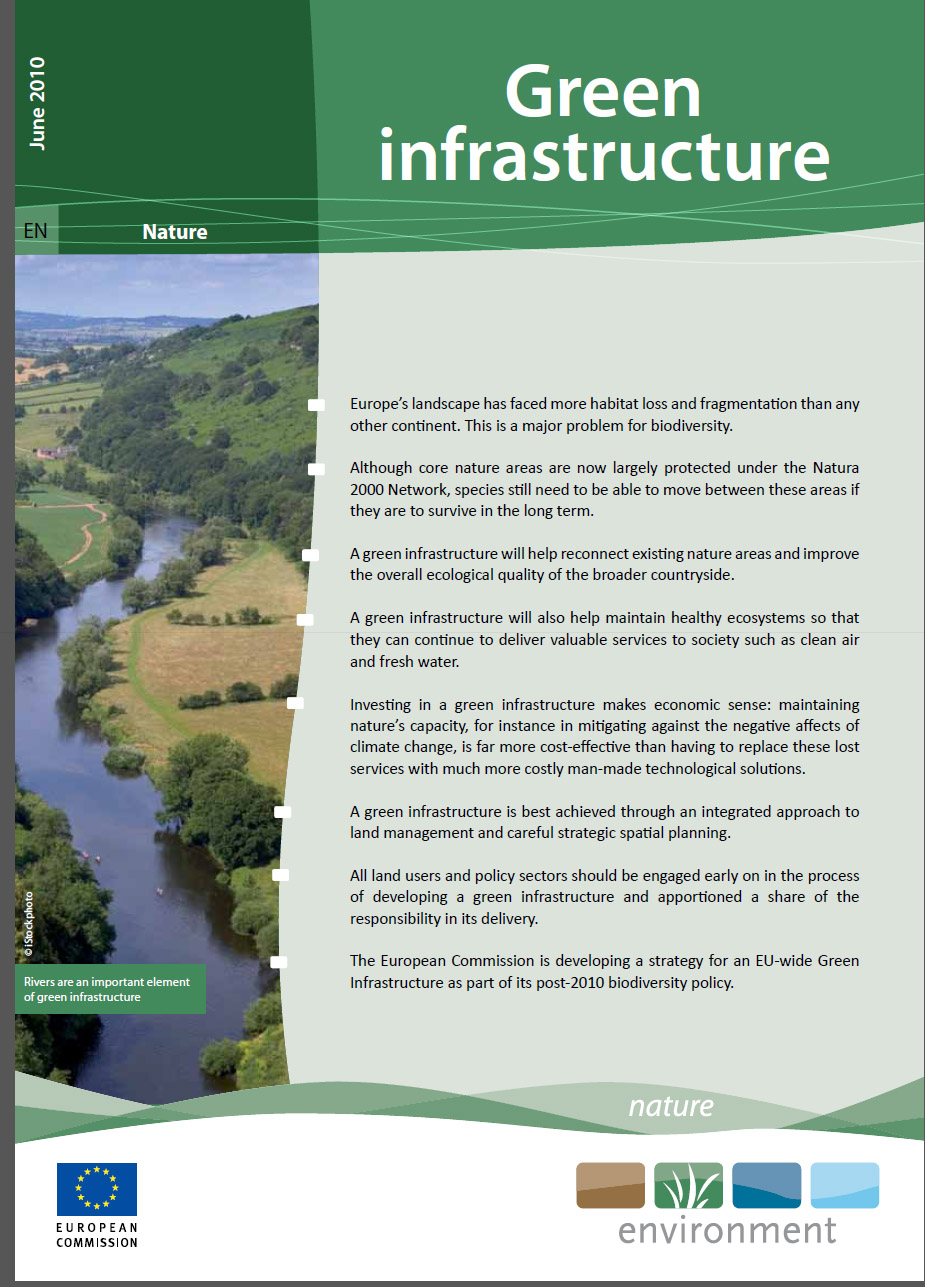
Presentation (2010) of European Commission neaw strategy for an EU-wide Green Infrastructure, as part of its post-2010 biodiversity policy

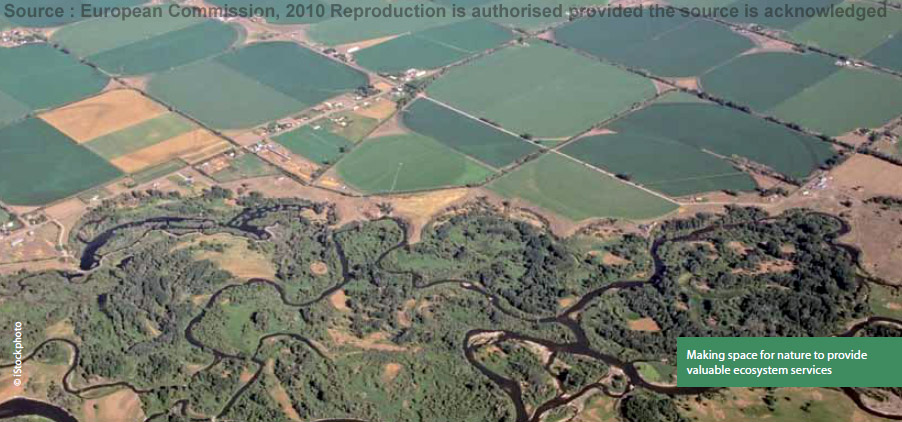
Aerial photography used by the European Commission as an example of ecological corridor (wetland) in intensive agriculture zone; Retrieved 2013-05-30

The European green infrastructure is an important part of the new (post-2010) EU strategy for biodiversity and biodiversity policy.

It is one of the main tools to tackle threats on biodiversity resulting from habitat fragmentation, land use change and loss of habitats. Green Infrastructure will play a decisive role in integrating biodiversity into other policies, such as agriculture, forestry, water, marine and fisheries, regional and cohesion policy, climate change mitigation and adaptation, transport, energy and land use policy. It is also an important tool for existing Directives such as the Water Framework Directive, the Marine Framework Directive, Environmental Impact Assessment and Strategic Environment Assessment Directives.

In addition, particular attention will be given to strengthening the integration of green infrastructure aspects in the EU’s various funding programmes (e.g. structural and cohesion funds, CAP, LIFE) over the current and future financial programming period starting in 2013 and to improving the ecological coherence of the Natura 2000 Network.

== GIS applications ==
The continued development of Geographic Information Systems (GIS) and their increasing level of use is particularly important in the development of Green Infrastructure plans. The plans frequently are based on GIS analysis of many layers of geographic information.

== See also ==
- Green infrastructure
- Low-impact development
- Sustainable urban drainage systems
