= Lume (disambiguation) =

Lume is a phosphorescent dial paint.

It may also refer to

- Lume Books, British publisher
- Lume-1, Spanish nanosatellite

== Places ==
- Lumë, a village in Albania
- Lumë (region), a region between Albania and Kosovo
- Lume (woreda), a district of Ethiopia

== See also ==
- Lumes, a commune in the Ardennes of northern France
- Pedra de Lume, a village in the Cape Verdes Islands
- Ville-sur-Lumes, a commune in the Ardennes of northern France
- Media Centre Lume, national audiovisual centre at Helsinki, Finland
