= Neufmanil Castle =

Coordinates: 49°48′38″N 4°47′41″E

Neufmanil Castle (French: Château de Neufmanil) was a fortified house in the commune of Neufmanil in the Ardennes département of France.

== History ==
In 1297, the Neufmanil family were given jurisdiction over the area by Jacques d'Orchimont. Jean d'Esclassin and Errard de la Morteau held the manor of Neufmanil in 1449.

In the 16th century, a fortified house surrounded by water was constructed. The castle was destroyed several times: in 1587, it was destroyed by the inhabitants of Gespunsart. It was rebuilt the following year; a 1588 document shows that the castle was surrounded by ditches filled with water and was to be accessed through a drawbridge. It was destroyed again in 1627 and then rebuilt by Nicolas Desprez de Barchon. Two wings were added in 1753.

Since the castle's destruction by fire in 1941, housing has been built on the ruins.

== See also ==
- List of castles in France
