= Ville-sur-Lumes =

- Commune
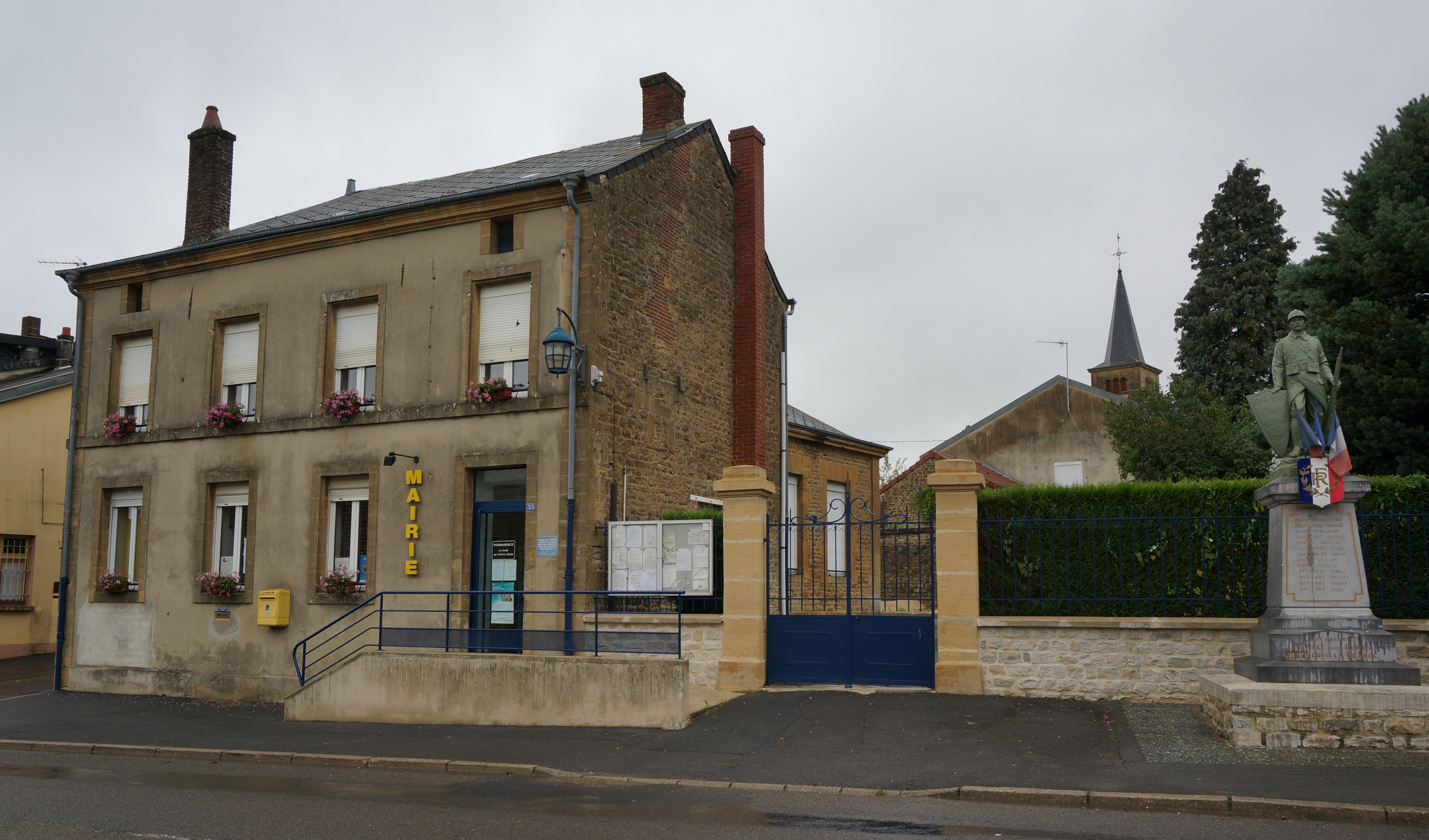
- The town hall in Ville-sur-Lumes

- Coat of arms
- Location of Ville-sur-Lumes
- Location within France Location within Grand Est
- Coordinates: 49°45′14″N 4°47′28″E
- Country: France
- Region: Grand Est
- Department: Ardennes
- Arrondissement: Charleville-Mézières
- Canton: Villers-Semeuse
- Intercommunality: CA Ardenne Métropole

Government
  - Mayor (2020–2026): Jean-Louis Boucher
- Area^{1}: 3.10 km^{2} (1.20 sq mi)
- Elevation: 256 m (840 ft)
- Highest elevation: 273 m (896 ft)
- Lowest elevation: 180 m (590 ft)
- Population (2023): 530
  - Density: 170/km^{2} (440/sq mi)
- Time zone: UTC+01:00 (CET)
  - Summer (DST): UTC+02:00 (CEST)
- INSEE/Postal code: 08483 /08440
- ^{1} French Land Register data, which excludes lakes, ponds, glaciers > 1 km^{2} (0.386 sq mi or 247 acres) and river estuaries.

Ville-sur-Lumes is a commune in the Ardennes department, and Grand Est in northern France.

== Geography ==
Ville-sur-Lumes lies near the right bank of the Meuse, 7 km from the border with Belgium and 5 km east of Charleville-Mézières. Neighbouring communes include Saint-Laurent and Lumes.

== Population ==
Historical population
Year	Pop.	±% p.a.
1968	244	—
1975	323	+4.09%
1982	371	+2.00%
1990	340	−1.08%
1999	373	+1.03%
2007	457	+2.57%
2012	513	+2.34%
2017	520	+0.27%
2023	530	+0.32%
Source: INSEE

== Housing ==
As of 2020, there were 222 homes in Ville-sur-Lumes, of which 94.1% main residences, 1.4% second or seasonal home, and 4.5% vacant homes. 95.9% were houses and 4.1% were apartments. Of the main residences, 77.5% were occupied by their owners and 22.5% were rented.

== Economy ==
As of 2020, the population of the working age was 309 people, of which 78.6% were active (73.8% employed, 4.9% unemployed) and 21.4% were inactive (8.1% students, 5.8% retired).

== See also ==
- Communes of the Ardennes department
