= Les Ayvelles =

- Commune
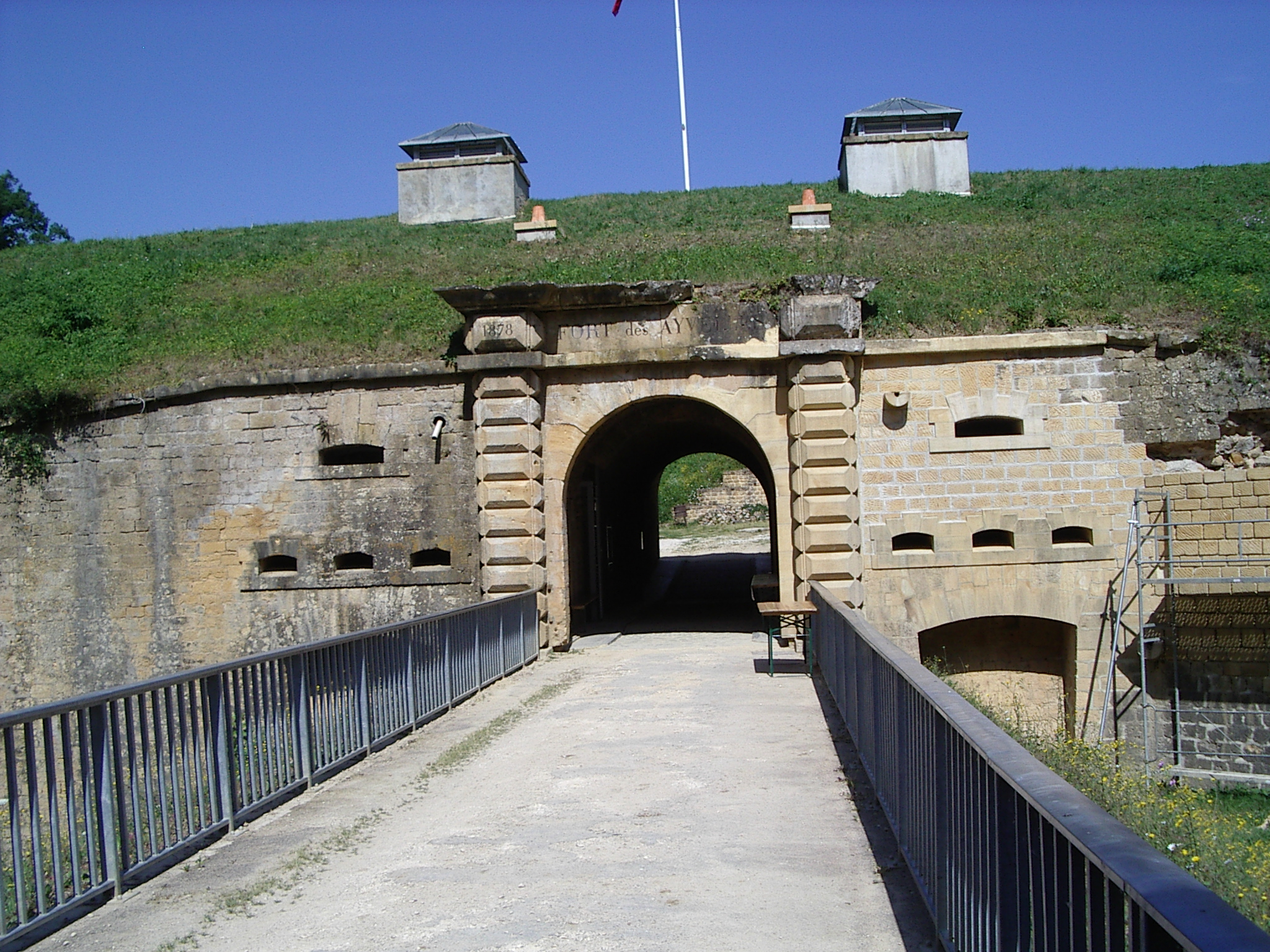
- The Fort of Ayvelles

- Coat of arms
- Location of Les Ayvelles
- Location within France Location within Grand Est
- Coordinates: 49°43′20″N 4°45′28″E
- Country: France
- Region: Grand Est
- Department: Ardennes
- Arrondissement: Charleville-Mézières
- Canton: Nouvion-sur-Meuse
- Intercommunality: CA Ardenne Métropole

Government
  - Mayor (2023–2026): Sylvia Tucci
- Area^{1}: 5.45 km^{2} (2.10 sq mi)
- Elevation: 155 m (509 ft)
- Highest elevation: 210 m (690 ft)
- Lowest elevation: 143 m (469 ft)
- Population (2023): 851
  - Density: 156/km^{2} (404/sq mi)
- Time zone: UTC+01:00 (CET)
  - Summer (DST): UTC+02:00 (CEST)
- INSEE/Postal code: 08040 /08000
- ^{1} French Land Register data, which excludes lakes, ponds, glaciers > 1 km^{2} (0.386 sq mi or 247 acres) and river estuaries.

Les Ayvelles (French pronunciation: [le.z‿ɛvɛl]) is a commune in the Ardennes department in the Grand Est region of northern France.

== Geography ==
Les Ayvelles is located just 5 km south-east of Charleville-Mézières. Access to the commune is by road D764 from Villers-Semeuse in the north which passes through the centre of the commune and the village and continues to Flize in the south. The commune has large reservoirs in the east and a forest in the west (the Bois des Ayvelles) with the rest of the commune farmland.

The Meuse river forms the eastern border of the commune as it flows north to Belgium. The Ruisseau du Pierge rises in the west of the commune and flows east to join the Meuse.

=== Neighbouring communes and villages ===
Source:

=== Heraldry ===
Arms of Les Ayvelles	Blazon: Argent, a saltire Gules cantoned with, in chief and in base a lion Sable tongued and armed Gules, to dexter and sinister a mullet Sable pierced.

== Administration ==
List of Successive Mayors

From	To	Name
1995	2008	Robert Binet
2008	2014	Jacques Bragantini
2014	current	Philippe Lebreton

== Demography ==
The inhabitants of the commune are known both as Ayvelliens or Ayvelliennes as well as Ayvellois or Ayvelloises in French.

Historical population

Year	Pop.	±% p.a.
1793	120	—
1821	190	+1.65%
1846	357	+2.55%
1872	342	−0.16%
1901	447	+0.93%
1926	349	−0.99%
1946	343	−0.09%
1962	410	+1.12%
1968	418	+0.32%

Year	Pop.	±% p.a.
1975	511	+2.91%
1982	603	+2.39%
1990	816	+3.85%
1999	769	−0.66%
2007	889	+1.83%
2012	975	+1.86%
2017	897	−1.65%
2023	851	−0.87%

Source: EHESS and INSEE

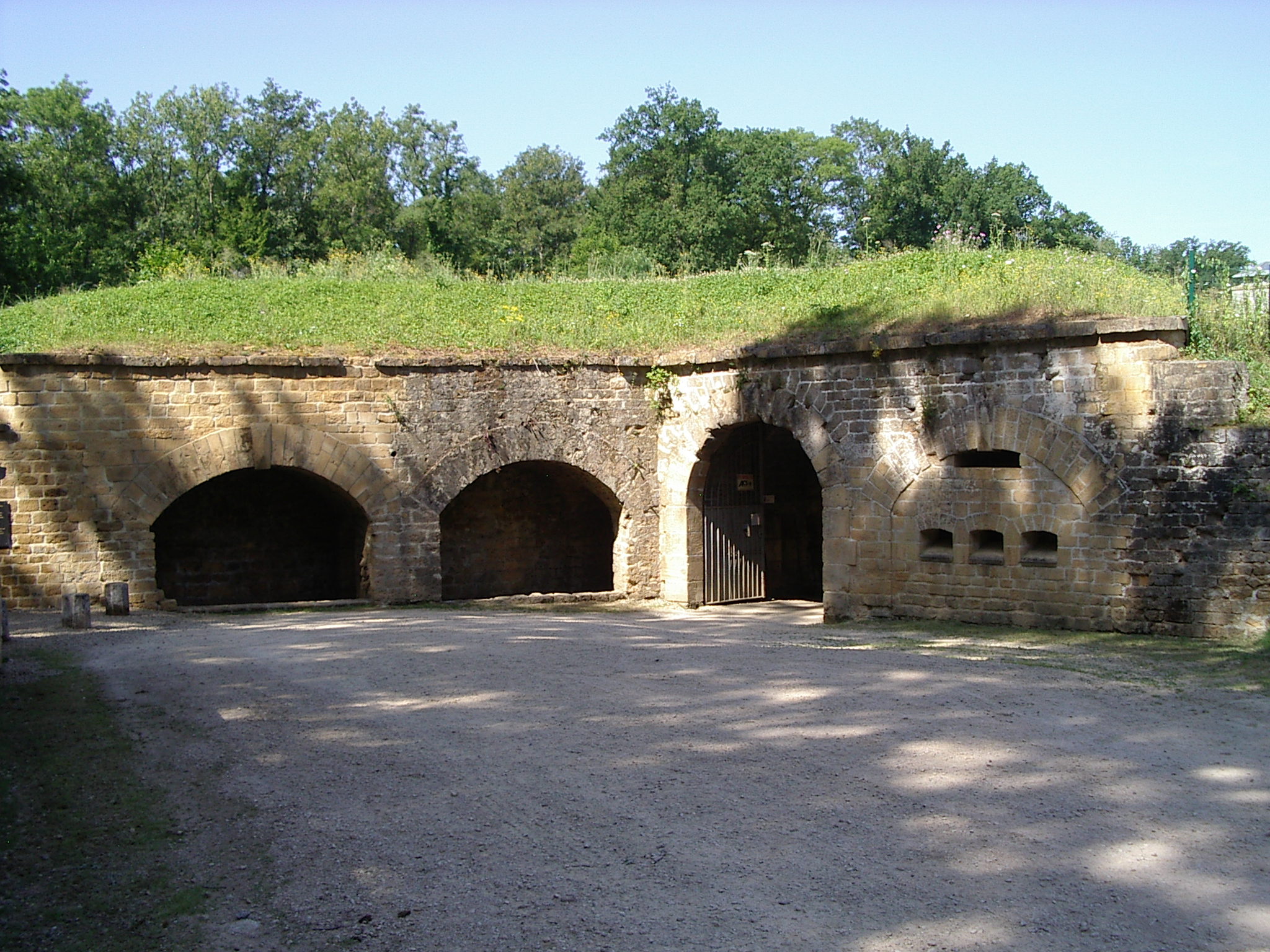
The Fort of Ayvelles

== Culture and heritage ==
=== Civil heritage ===
- The Fort and Battery of Ayvelles. The Fort can be visited by appointment.

=== Religious heritage ===
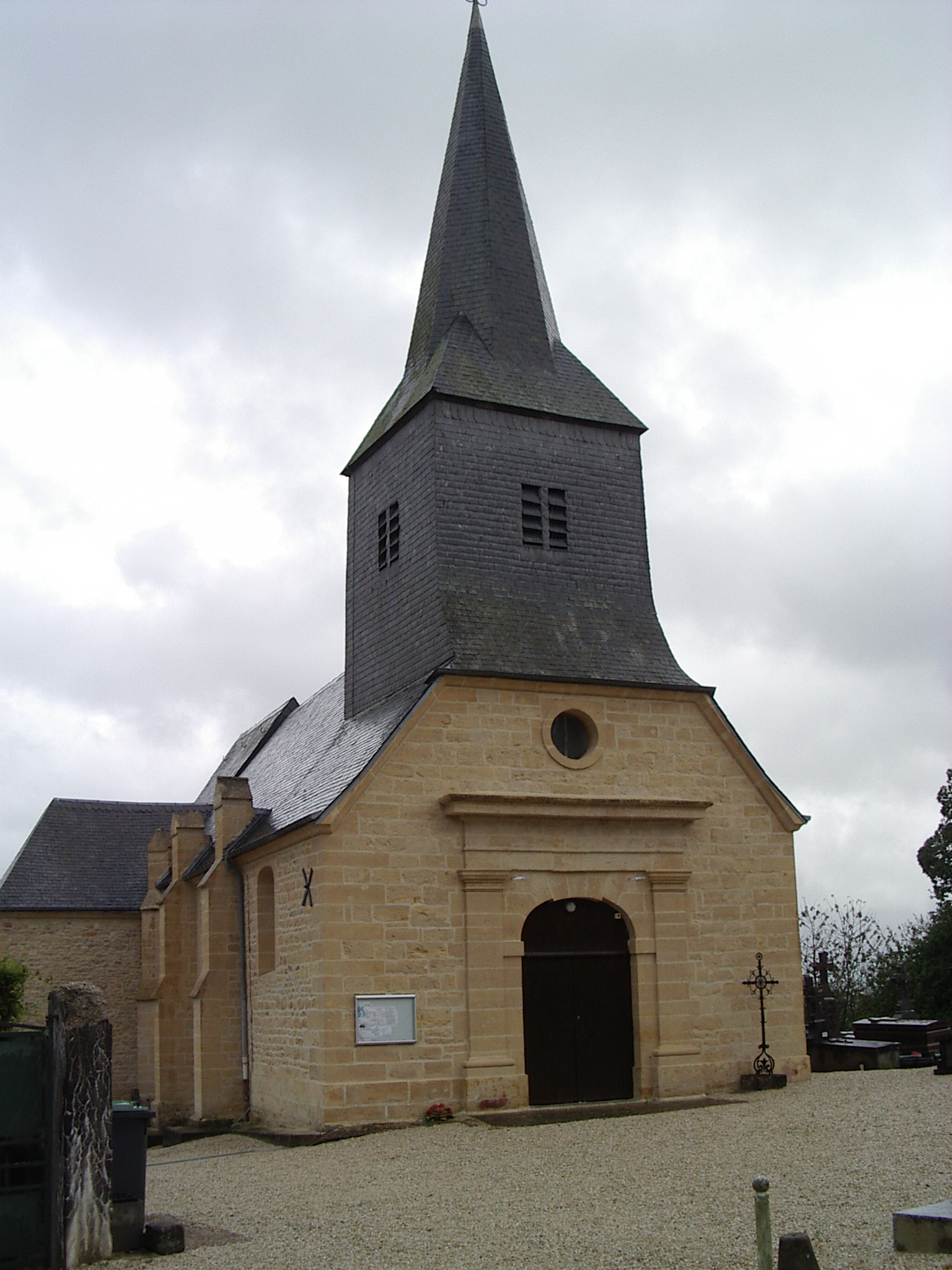
The Parish Church of Saint Rémi

The Parish Church of Saint Rémi contains several items that are registered as historical objects:

- The Tombstone of Priest Ponce Guérin (1690)
- A Baptismal font (12th century)
- A Chalice with Paten (1750 and 1752)

== See also ==
- Communes of the Ardennes department
