= Vrigne =

Vrigne may refer to two communes in the Ardennes department in northern France:

- Vrigne-aux-Bois
- Vrigne-Meuse
