= Arreux =

- Commune
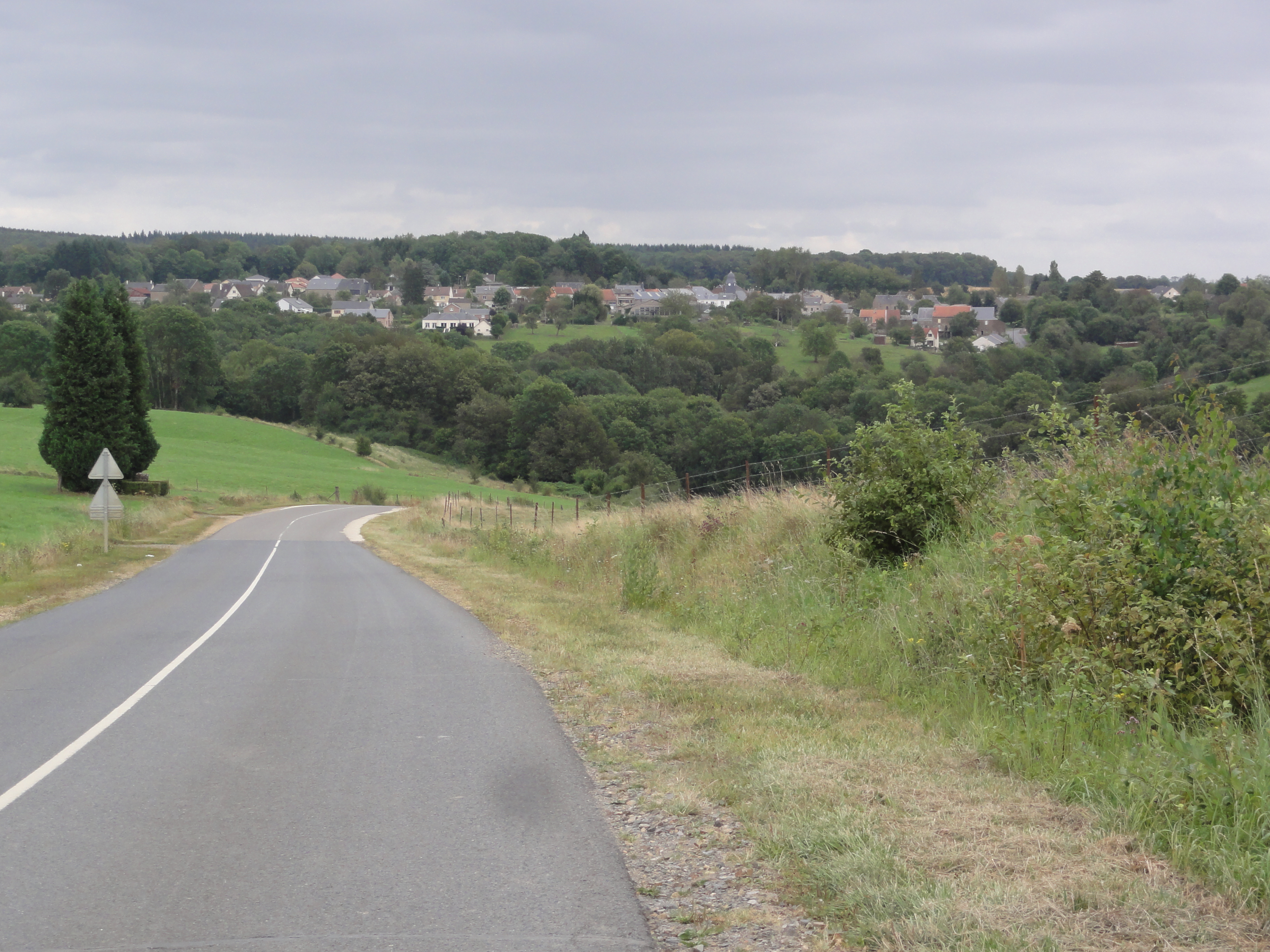
- View of the village

- Coat of arms
- Location of Arreux
- Location within France Location within Grand Est
- Coordinates: 49°49′32″N 4°39′09″E
- Country: France
- Region: Grand Est
- Department: Ardennes
- Arrondissement: Charleville-Mézières
- Canton: Charleville-Mézières-2
- Intercommunality: Ardenne Métropole

Government
  - Mayor (2022–2026): Agnès Henon
- Area^{1}: 4.23 km^{2} (1.63 sq mi)
- Elevation: 246 m (807 ft)
- Population (2023): 353
  - Density: 83.5/km^{2} (216/sq mi)
- Time zone: UTC+01:00 (CET)
  - Summer (DST): UTC+02:00 (CEST)
- INSEE/Postal code: 08022 /08090
- ^{1} French Land Register data, which excludes lakes, ponds, glaciers > 1 km^{2} (0.386 sq mi or 247 acres) and river estuaries.

Arreux (French pronunciation: [aʁø]) is a commune in the Ardennes department in the Grand Est region of northern France.

The commune has been awarded one flower by the National Council of Towns and Villages in Bloom in the Competition of cities and villages in Bloom.

== Geography ==
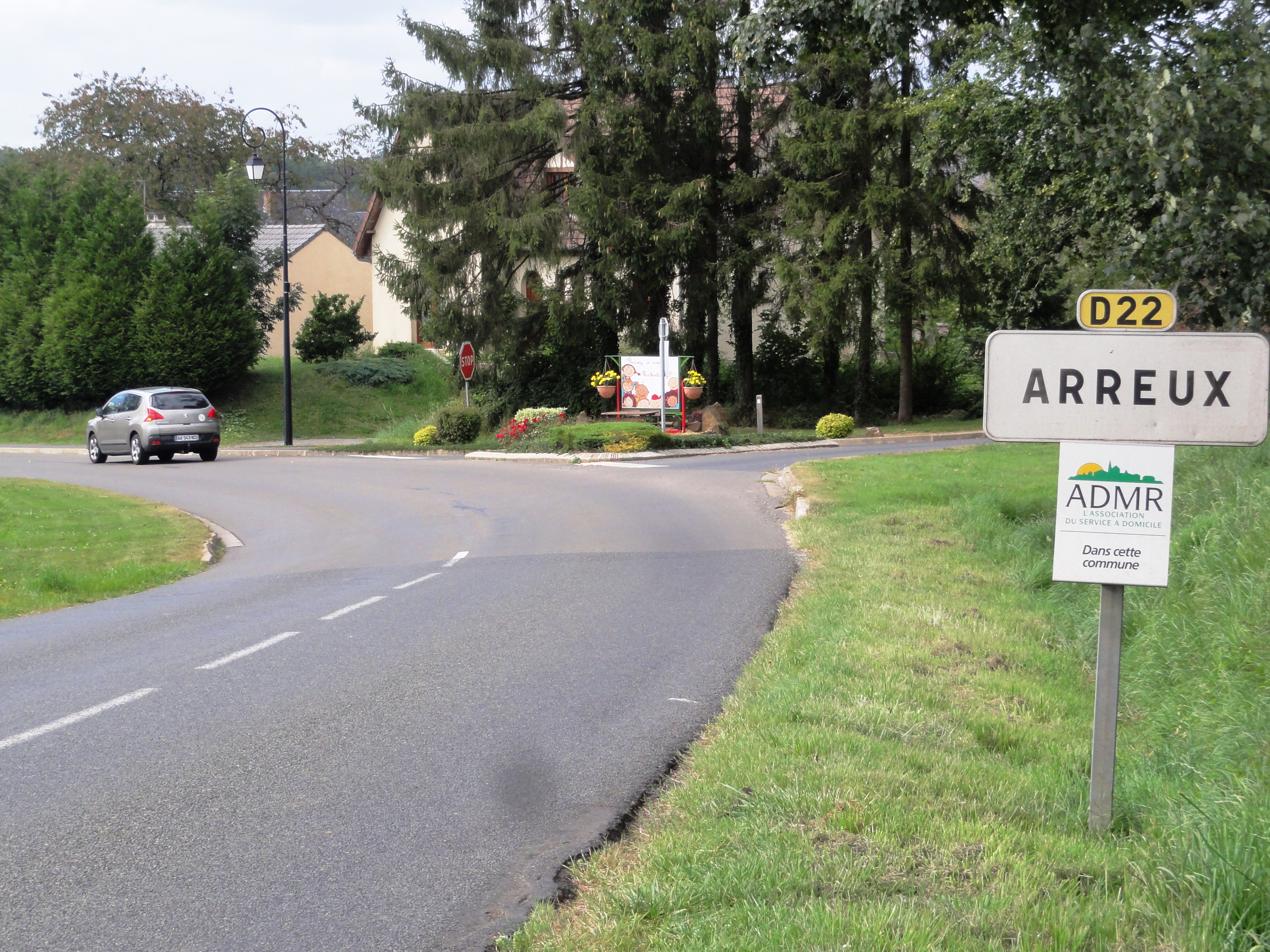
Entrance to the village

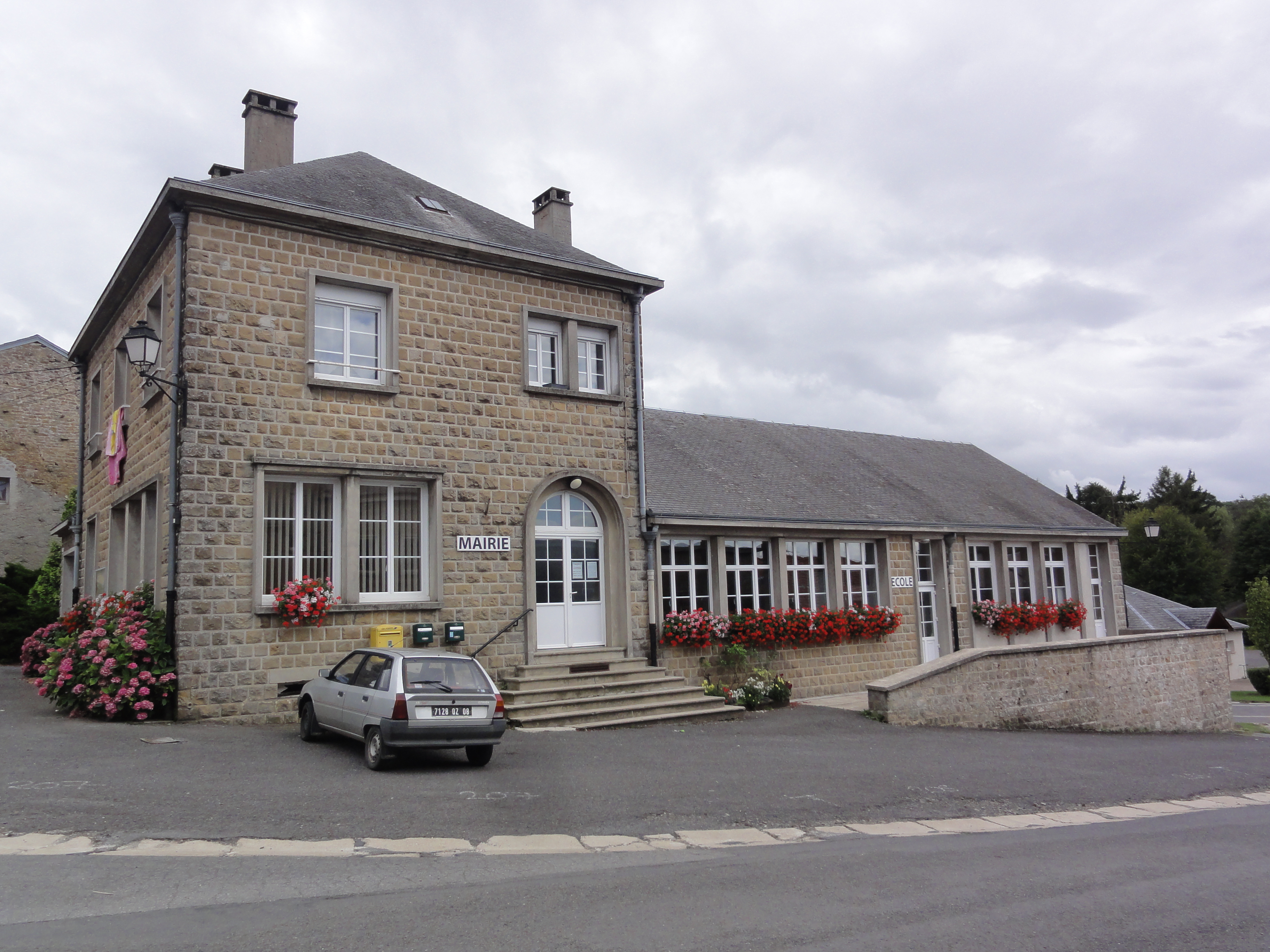
The Town Hall

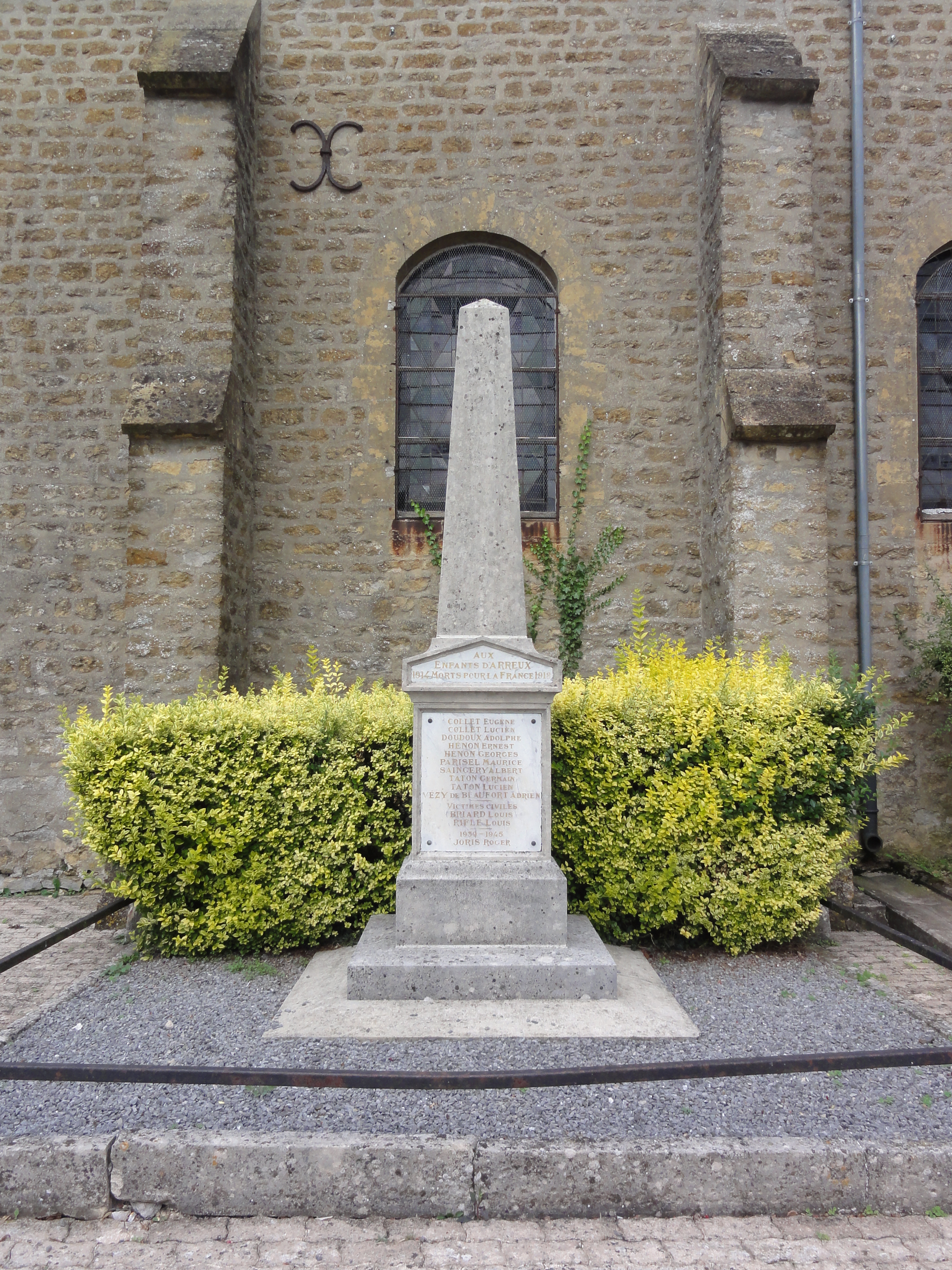
The War Memorial

Arreux is located in a hilly area on the edge of The Ardennes some 9 km north-west of Charleville-Mézières and 3 km east by south-east of Renwez. Access to the commune is by road D22 from Montcornet in the west passing through the village and continuing east to Nouzonville. The D22 also forms the south-eastern border of the commune. Some two thirds of the commune is heavily forested - especially in the east, with some farmland around the village.

The Ruisseau du Fond d'Arreux forms the north eastern and north-western border of the commune as it flows around the commune and then away to the south-west. A stream rises south of the village and flows north to join the Ruisseau du Fond d'Arreux.

== Toponymy ==
According to Ernest Nègre the name Arreux comes from aridus meaning "arid".

=== Heraldry ===
Arms of Arreux	Blazon: Quarterly, 1 of Vert a tête de Chèvre erased of Argent; 2 of Argent two hammers Vert posed saltirewise; 3 of Argent a garb of 3 ears of wheat Vert; 4 of Vert a wolf's head erased of Argent.

== Administration ==
List of Successive Mayors

From	To	Name
1965	1972	Louis Savary de Beauregard
1972	1983	Robert Remacly
1983	2001	Yves Doe
2001	2020	Robert Colson
2020	current	Emmanuel Roussel

== Demography ==
The inhabitants of the commune are known as Cabres in French.

Historical population

Year	Pop.	±% p.a.
1793	220	—
1821	248	+0.43%
1846	278	+0.46%
1872	321	+0.55%
1901	316	−0.05%
1926	228	−1.30%
1946	153	−1.97%
1962	205	+1.85%
1968	199	−0.49%

Year	Pop.	±% p.a.
1975	195	−0.29%
1982	256	+3.96%
1990	297	+1.87%
1999	320	+0.83%
2007	363	+1.59%
2012	346	−0.95%
2017	324	−1.31%
2023	353	+1.44%

Source: EHESS and INSEE

== Sites and monuments ==
- The Church of Saint Lambert from 1811
- The Chateau of Arreux (private property). The old Chateau of Arreux, shown in the Album of Croy, has not left any traces.
- A Lavoir (public laundry) transformed into a library
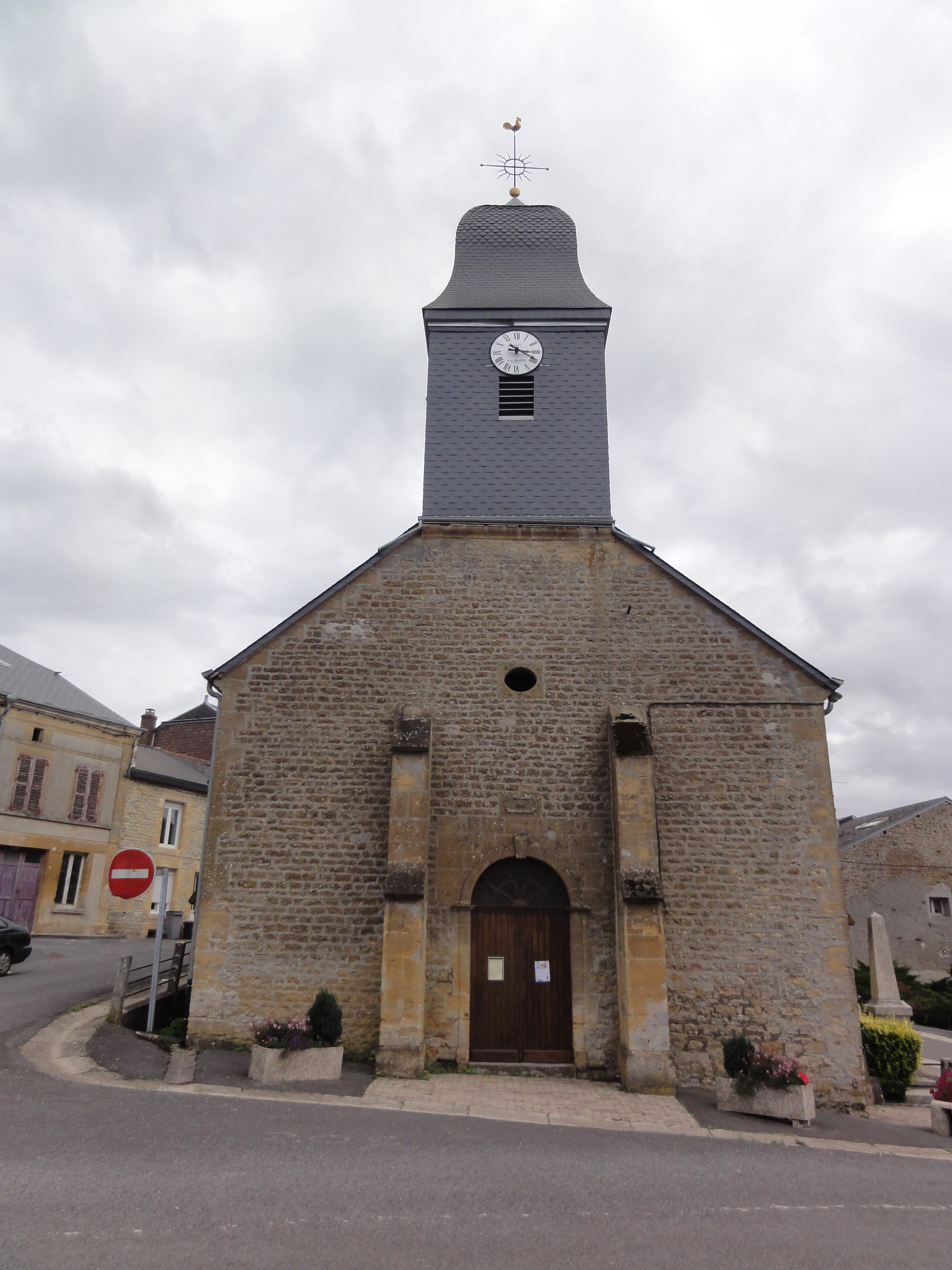
The Church of Saint Lambert

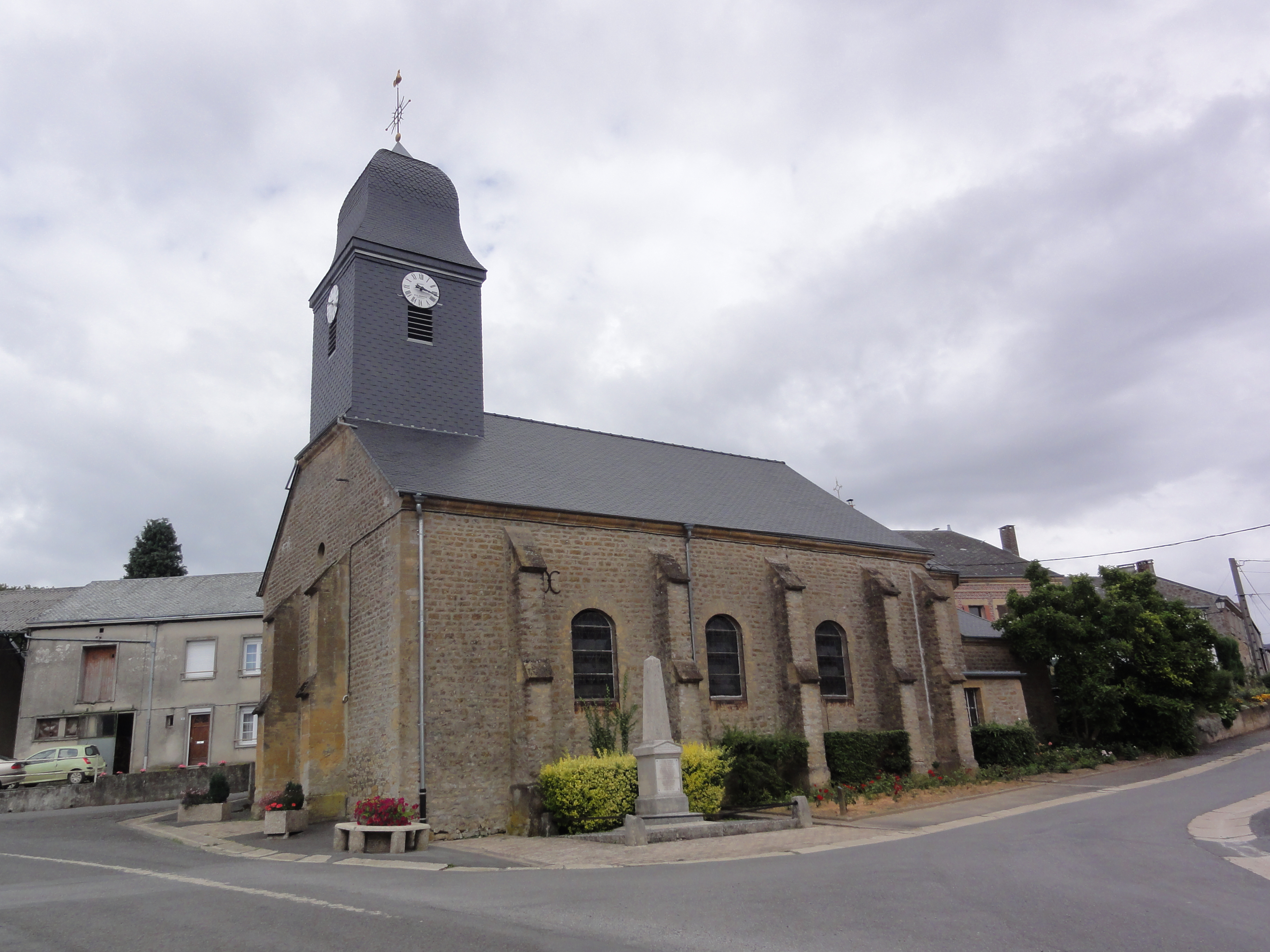
Lateral view of the church

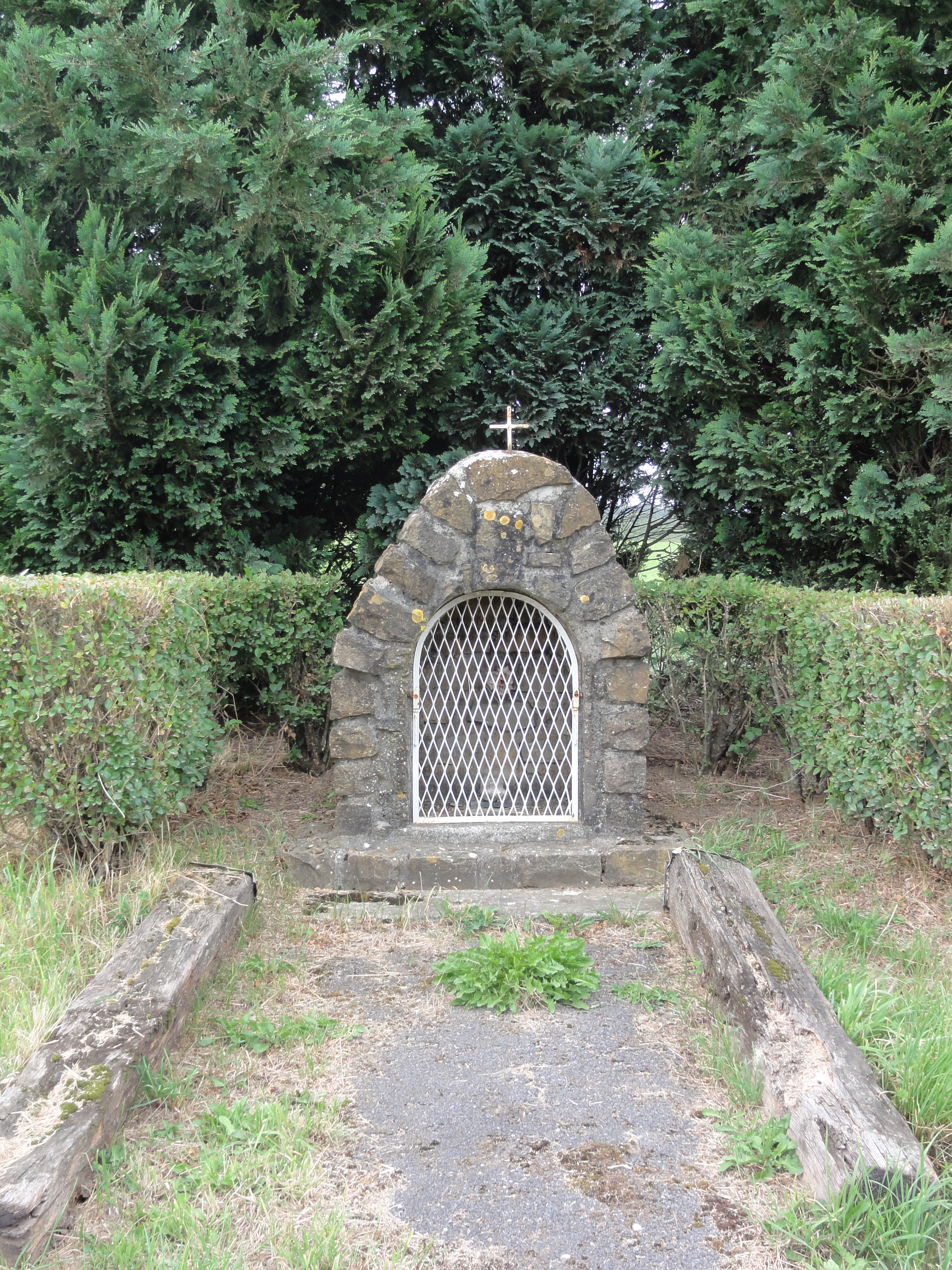
The oratory of the chapel

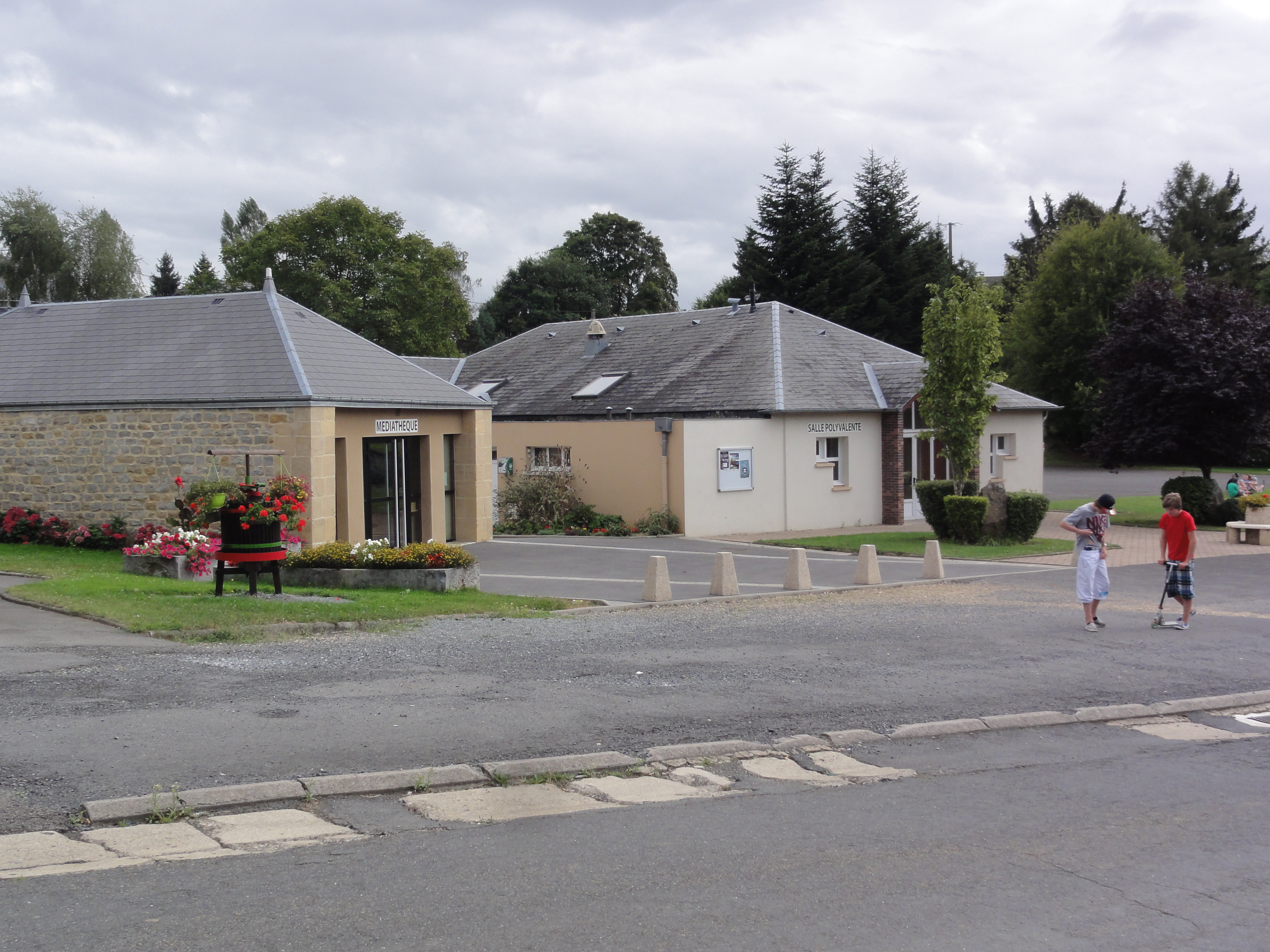
The old Lavoir converted to a library

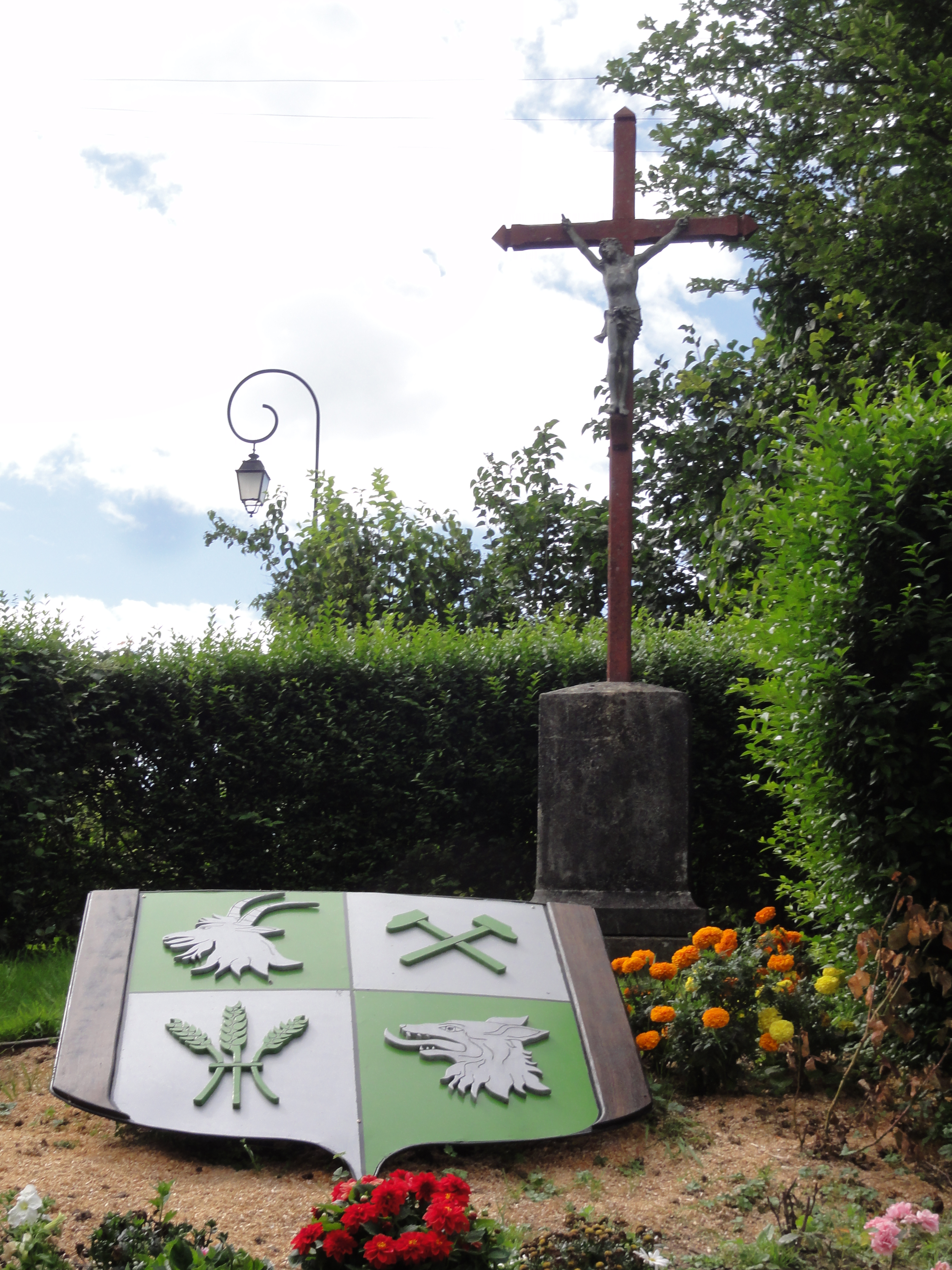
A cross with the commune Arms

== See also ==
- Communes of the Ardennes department
