= Gernelle =

- Commune
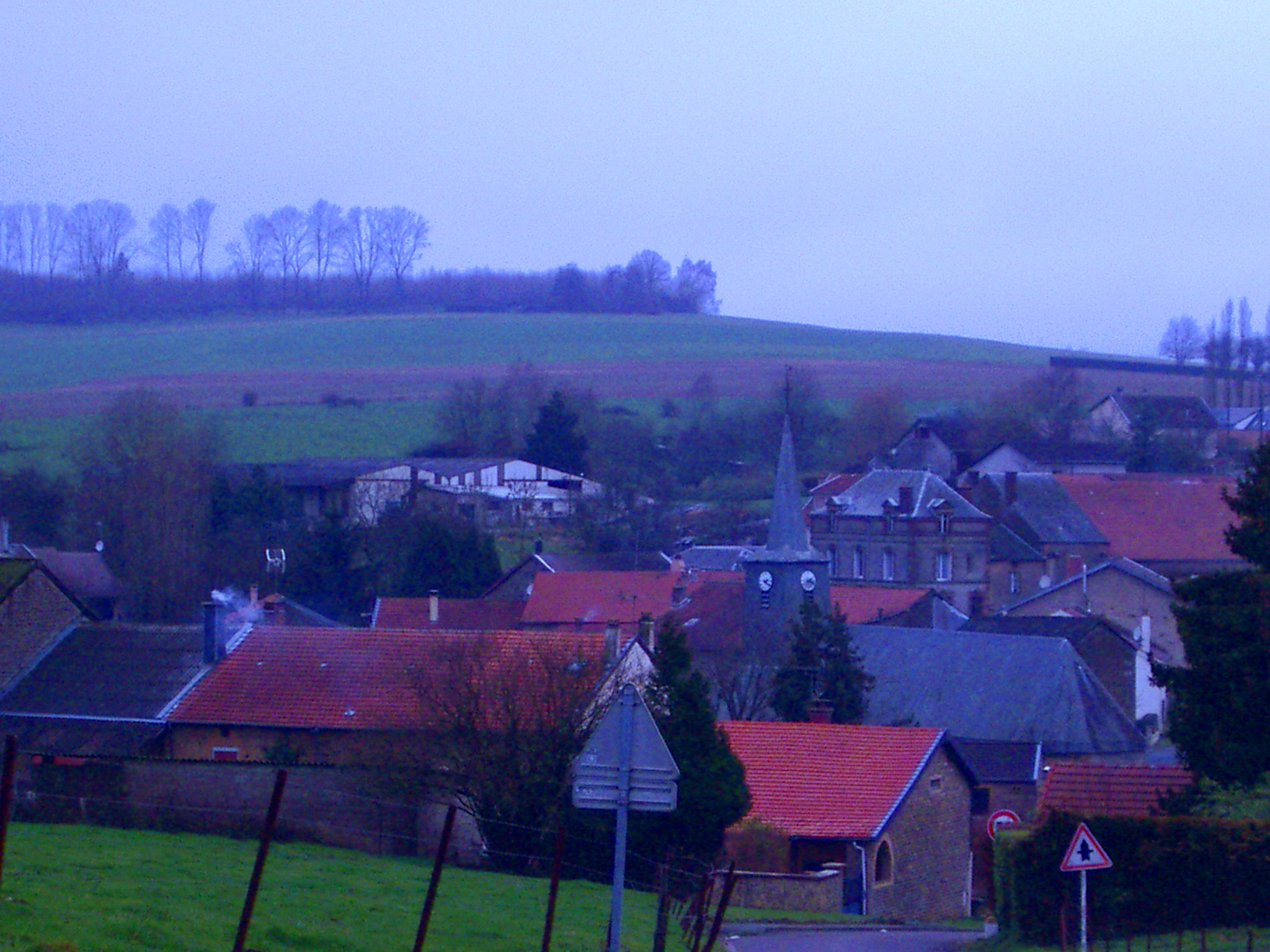
- A general view of Gernelle

- Coat of arms
- Location of Gernelle
- Location within France Location within Grand Est
- Coordinates: 49°46′06″N 4°49′04″E
- Country: France
- Region: Grand Est
- Department: Ardennes
- Arrondissement: Charleville-Mézières
- Canton: Villers-Semeuse
- Intercommunality: CA Ardenne Métropole

Government
  - Mayor (2020–2026): Cathy Ninin
- Area^{1}: 4.83 km^{2} (1.86 sq mi)
- Elevation: 240 m (790 ft)
- Highest elevation: 292 m (958 ft)
- Lowest elevation: 178 m (584 ft)
- Population (2023): 314
  - Density: 65.0/km^{2} (168/sq mi)
- Time zone: UTC+01:00 (CET)
  - Summer (DST): UTC+02:00 (CEST)
- INSEE/Postal code: 08187 /08440
- ^{1} French Land Register data, which excludes lakes, ponds, glaciers > 1 km^{2} (0.386 sq mi or 247 acres) and river estuaries.

Gernelle (French pronunciation: [ʒɛʁnɛl]) is a commune in the Ardennes department in northern France.

== Population ==
Historical population
Year	Pop.	±% p.a.
1968	230	—
1975	257	+1.60%
1982	322	+3.27%
1990	330	+0.31%
1999	335	+0.17%
2007	342	+0.26%
2012	332	−0.59%
2017	313	−1.17%
2023	314	+0.05%
Source: INSEE

== See also ==
- Communes of the Ardennes department
