= Damouzy =

- Commune
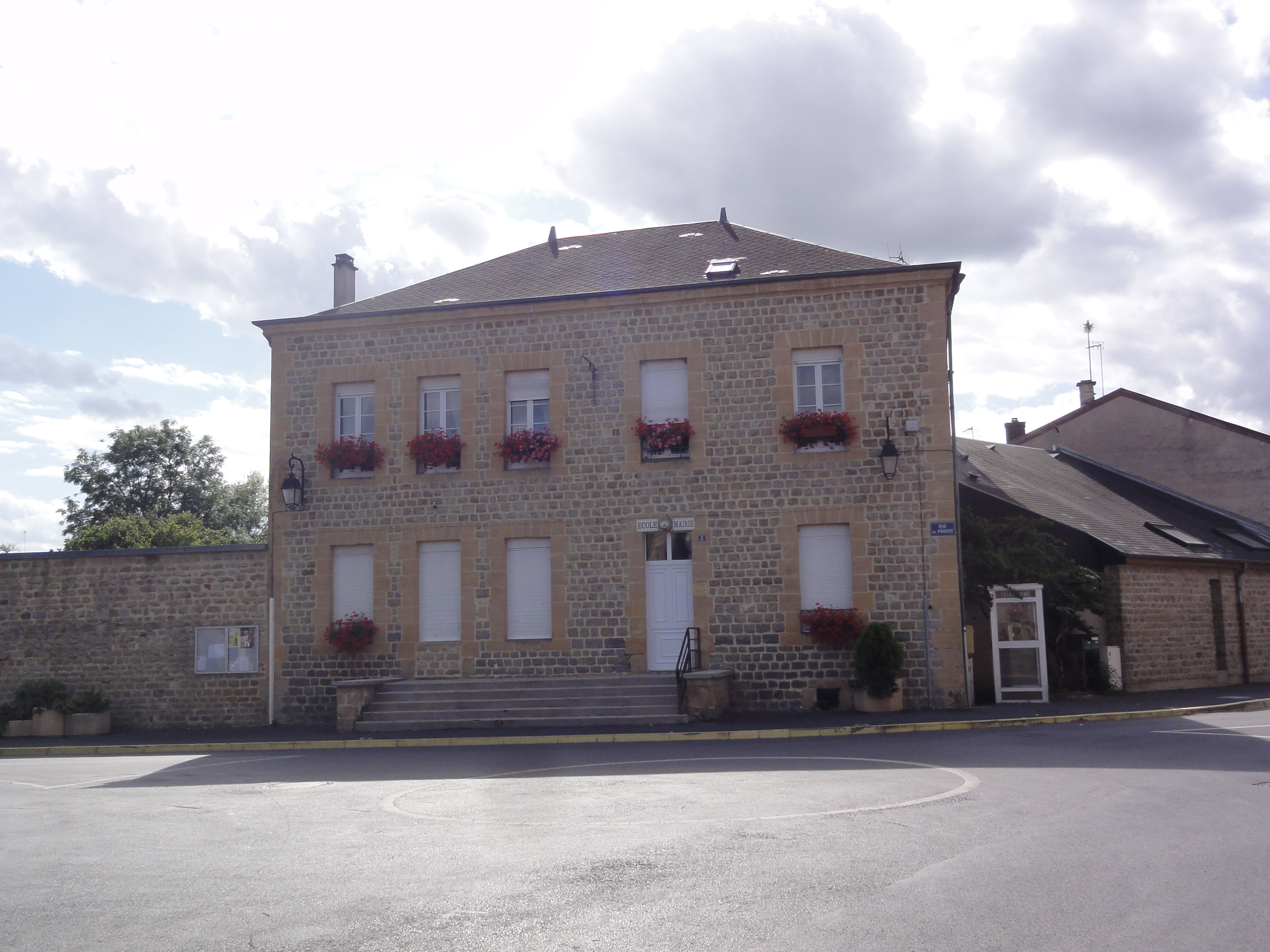
- The town hall in Damouzy

- Coat of arms
- Location of Damouzy
- Location within France Location within Grand Est
- Coordinates: 49°47′56″N 4°40′36″E
- Country: France
- Region: Grand Est
- Department: Ardennes
- Arrondissement: Charleville-Mézières
- Canton: Charleville-Mézières-2
- Intercommunality: CA Ardenne Métropole

Government
  - Mayor (2020–2026): Christian Schneider
- Area^{1}: 8.78 km^{2} (3.39 sq mi)
- Elevation: 200 m (660 ft)
- Population (2023): 423
  - Density: 48.2/km^{2} (125/sq mi)
- Time zone: UTC+01:00 (CET)
  - Summer (DST): UTC+02:00 (CEST)
- INSEE/Postal code: 08137 /08090
- ^{1} French Land Register data, which excludes lakes, ponds, glaciers > 1 km^{2} (0.386 sq mi or 247 acres) and river estuaries.

Damouzy (French pronunciation: [damuzi]) is a commune in the Ardennes department, in the Grand Est region.

== Geography ==
=== Location ===
Damouzy is a village situated 3.2km (1.99mi) north-west of Charleville-Mézières, and is part of the latter's urban area.

=== Hydrography ===
The commune is located in the drainage bassin of the Meuse, within the Rhine-Meuse bassin. It is drained by the Sormonne river, the Butte stream, the Fond d'Arreux stream, the Bassee stream, the Damouzy stream, the Fosse Aux Chaudrons stream, the Warne brook, the Pre Allard stream, and the Soque stream.

The Sormonne river forms part of the commune's southern border.

== Population ==
Historical population
Year	Pop.	±% p.a.
1968	292	—
1975	339	+2.15%
1982	373	+1.37%
1990	428	+1.73%
1999	448	+0.51%
2007	419	−0.83%
2012	415	−0.19%
2017	447	+1.50%
2023	423	−0.92%
Source: INSEE

== Notable people ==
Nicolas Martinet, soldiier of the French Revolution, adjudant-major, member of the Legion of Honour.

== See also ==
- Communes of the Ardennes department
