= Canton of Charleville-Mézières-2 =

Coordinates: 49.79°N 4.71°E

- Canton
- Situation of the canton of Charleville-Mézières-2 in the department of Ardennes
- Country: France
- Region: Grand Est
- Department: Ardennes
- No. of communes: {{{nbcomm}}}
- Population (2023): 16,016
- INSEE code: 0805

The canton of Charleville-Mézières-2 is an administrative division of the Ardennes department, northern France. It was created at the French canton reorganisation which came into effect in March 2015. Its seat is in Charleville-Mézières.

It consists of the following communes:

1. Arreux
2. Charleville-Mézières (partly)
3. Damouzy
4. Houldizy
5. Nouzonville
6. Sécheval
