= Canton of Villers-Semeuse =

Coordinates: 49.74°N 4.75°E

- Canton
- Situation of the canton of Villers-Semeuse in the department of Ardennes
- Country: France
- Region: Grand Est
- Department: Ardennes
- No. of communes: {{{nbcomm}}}
- Population (2023): 14,130
- INSEE code: 0818

The canton of Villers-Semeuse is an administrative division of the Ardennes department, northern France. Its borders were modified at the French canton reorganisation which came into effect in March 2015. Its seat is in Villers-Semeuse.

It consists of the following communes:

1. Aiglemont
2. Gernelle
3. Gespunsart
4. La Grandville
5. Issancourt-et-Rumel
6. Lumes
7. Neufmanil
8. Saint-Laurent
9. Villers-Semeuse
10. Ville-sur-Lumes
11. Vivier-au-Court
