= Houldizy =

- Commune
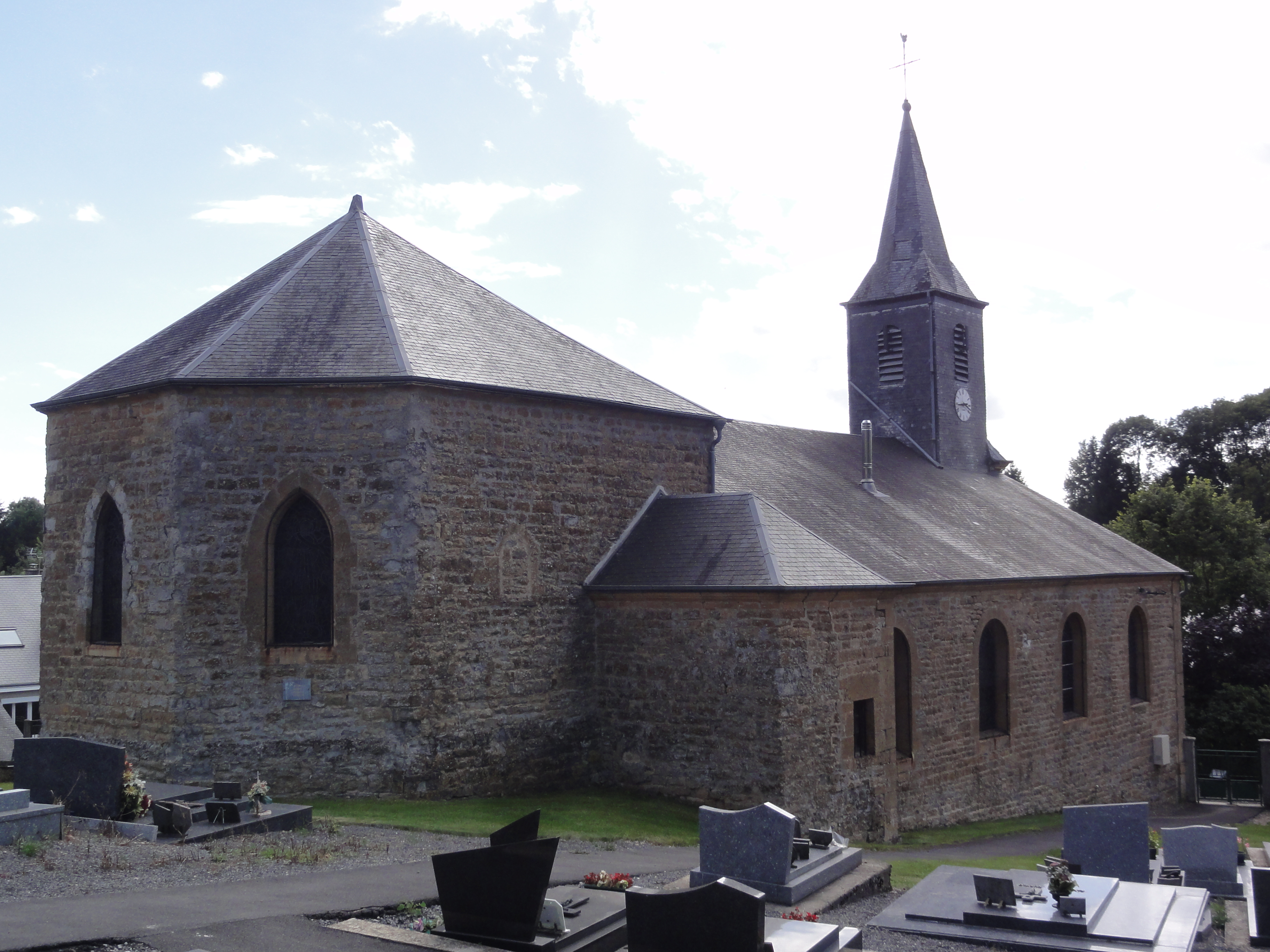
- The church in Houldizy

- Coat of arms
- Location of Houldizy
- Location within France Location within Grand Est
- Coordinates: 49°48′40″N 4°40′13″E
- Country: France
- Region: Grand Est
- Department: Ardennes
- Arrondissement: Charleville-Mézières
- Canton: Charleville-Mézières-2
- Intercommunality: CA Ardenne Métropole

Government
  - Mayor (2020–2026): Gérard Calvi
- Area^{1}: 4.62 km^{2} (1.78 sq mi)
- Elevation: 220 m (720 ft)
- Population (2023): 394
  - Density: 85.3/km^{2} (221/sq mi)
- Time zone: UTC+01:00 (CET)
  - Summer (DST): UTC+02:00 (CEST)
- INSEE/Postal code: 08230 /08090
- ^{1} French Land Register data, which excludes lakes, ponds, glaciers > 1 km^{2} (0.386 sq mi or 247 acres) and river estuaries.

Houldizy (French pronunciation: [uldizi]) is a commune in the Ardennes department in northern France.

== Population ==
Historical population
Year	Pop.	±% p.a.
1968	193	—
1975	245	+3.47%
1982	279	+1.87%
1990	328	+2.04%
1999	331	+0.10%
2007	346	+0.56%
2012	357	+0.63%
2017	374	+0.93%
2023	394	+0.87%
Source: INSEE

== See also ==
- Communes of the Ardennes department
