= La Grandville =

- Commune
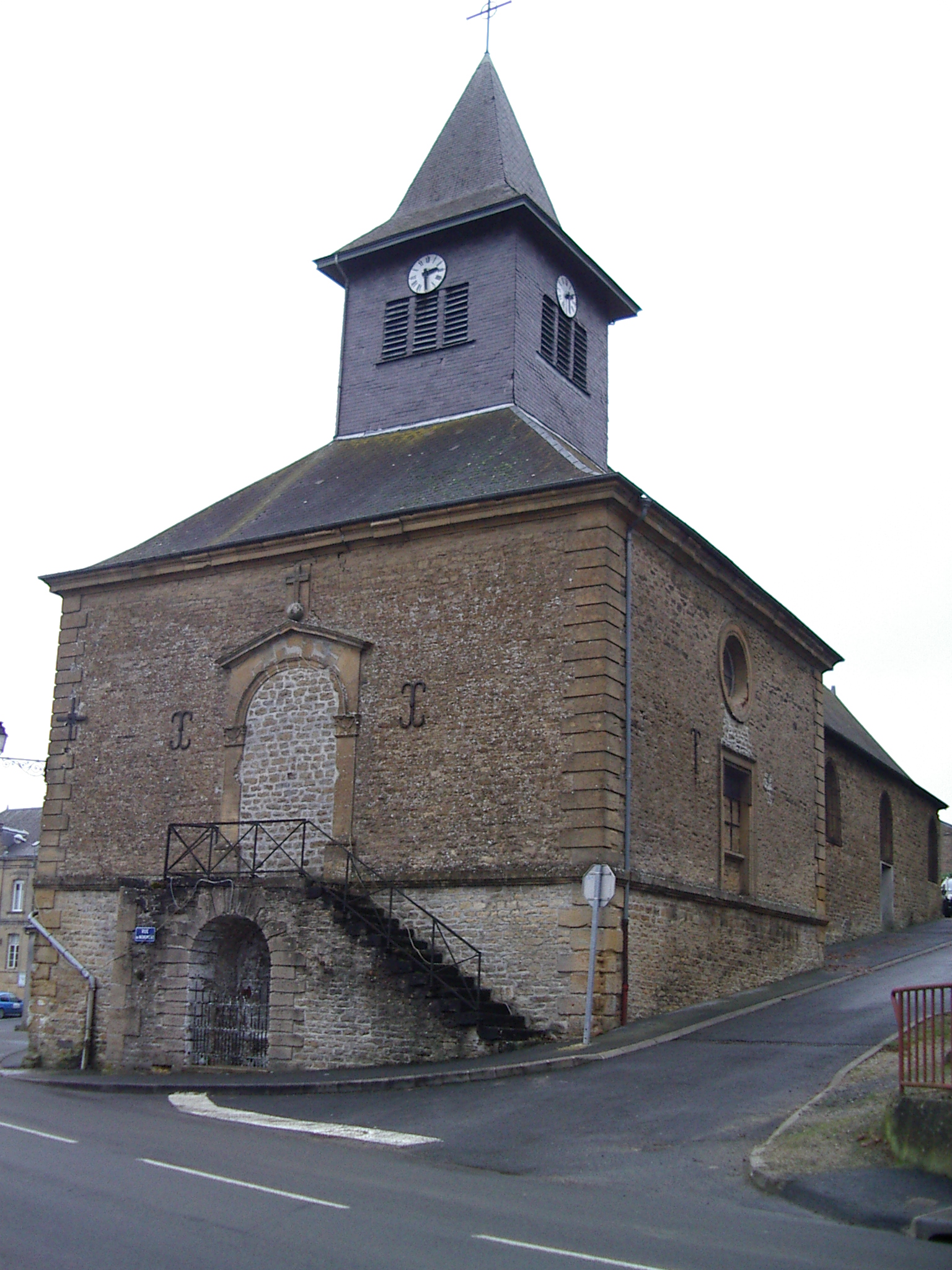
- The church in La Grandville

- Coat of arms
- Location of La Grandville
- Location within France Location within Grand Est
- Coordinates: 49°46′51″N 4°47′48″E
- Country: France
- Region: Grand Est
- Department: Ardennes
- Arrondissement: Charleville-Mézières
- Canton: Villers-Semeuse
- Intercommunality: CA Ardenne Métropole

Government
  - Mayor (2020–2026): Xavier Pecheux
- Area^{1}: 10.02 km^{2} (3.87 sq mi)
- Elevation: 300 m (980 ft)
- Population (2023): 753
  - Density: 75.1/km^{2} (195/sq mi)
- Time zone: UTC+01:00 (CET)
  - Summer (DST): UTC+02:00 (CEST)
- INSEE/Postal code: 08199 /08700
- ^{1} French Land Register data, which excludes lakes, ponds, glaciers > 1 km^{2} (0.386 sq mi or 247 acres) and river estuaries.

La Grandville (French pronunciation: [la ɡʁɑ̃vil]) is a commune in the Ardennes department and Grand Est region of north-eastern France.

== Population ==
Historical population
Year	Pop.	±% p.a.
1968	644	—
1975	550	−2.23%
1982	659	+2.62%
1990	683	+0.45%
1999	679	−0.07%
2007	783	+1.80%
2012	836	+1.32%
2017	795	−1.00%
2023	753	−0.90%
Source: INSEE

== See also ==
- Communes of the Ardennes department
