= Vivier-au-Court =

Vivier au Court
- Commune
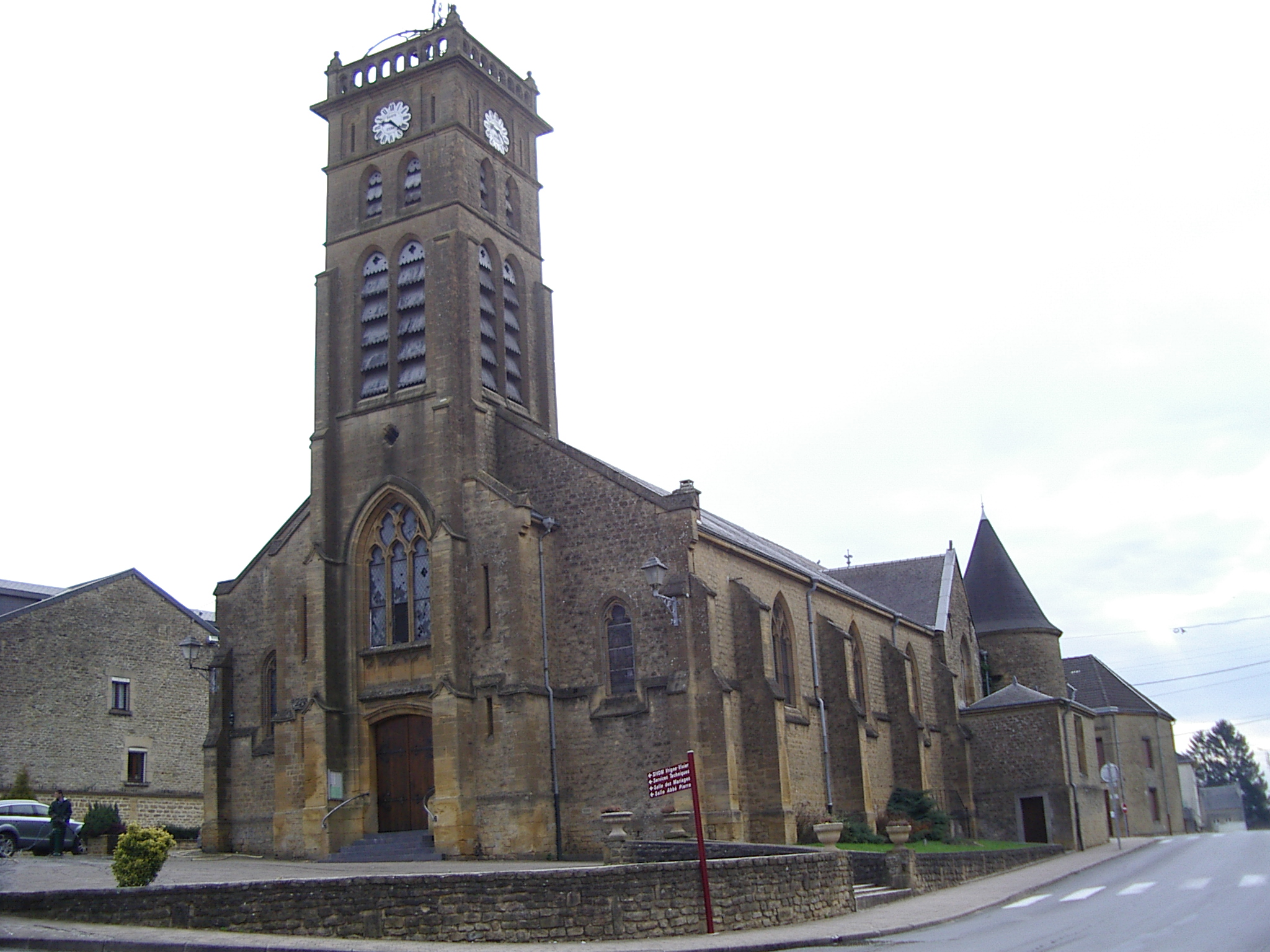
- The church in Vivier-au-Court

- Coat of arms
- Location of Vivier au Court
- Location within France Location within Grand Est
- Coordinates: 49°44′08″N 4°49′54″E
- Country: France
- Region: Grand Est
- Department: Ardennes
- Arrondissement: Charleville-Mézières
- Canton: Villers-Semeuse
- Intercommunality: Ardenne Métropole

Government
  - Mayor (2020–2026): Dominique Nicolas-Viot
- Area^{1}: 9.34 km^{2} (3.61 sq mi)
- Elevation: 200 m (660 ft)
- Highest elevation: 200 m (660 ft)
- Lowest elevation: 50 m (160 ft)
- Population (2023): 2,732
  - Density: 293/km^{2} (758/sq mi)
- Time zone: UTC+01:00 (CET)
  - Summer (DST): UTC+02:00 (CEST)
- INSEE/Postal code: 08488 /08440
- ^{1} French Land Register data, which excludes lakes, ponds, glaciers > 1 km^{2} (0.386 sq mi or 247 acres) and river estuaries.

Vivier-au-Court (French pronunciation: [vivje o kuʁ]) is a commune in the Ardennes department in northern France.

== Population ==
Historical population
| Year | Pop. | ±% p.a. |
|---|---|---|
| 1968 | 3,121 | — |
| 1975 | 3,137 | +0.07% |
| 1982 | 3,472 | +1.46% |
| 1990 | 3,488 | +0.06% |
| 1999 | 3,298 | −0.62% |
| 2007 | 3,384 | +0.32% |
| 2012 | 3,134 | −1.52% |
| 2017 | 2,954 | −1.18% |
| 2023 | 2,732 | −1.29% |
Source: INSEE

== See also ==
- Communes of the Ardennes department
