= Sécheval =

- Commune
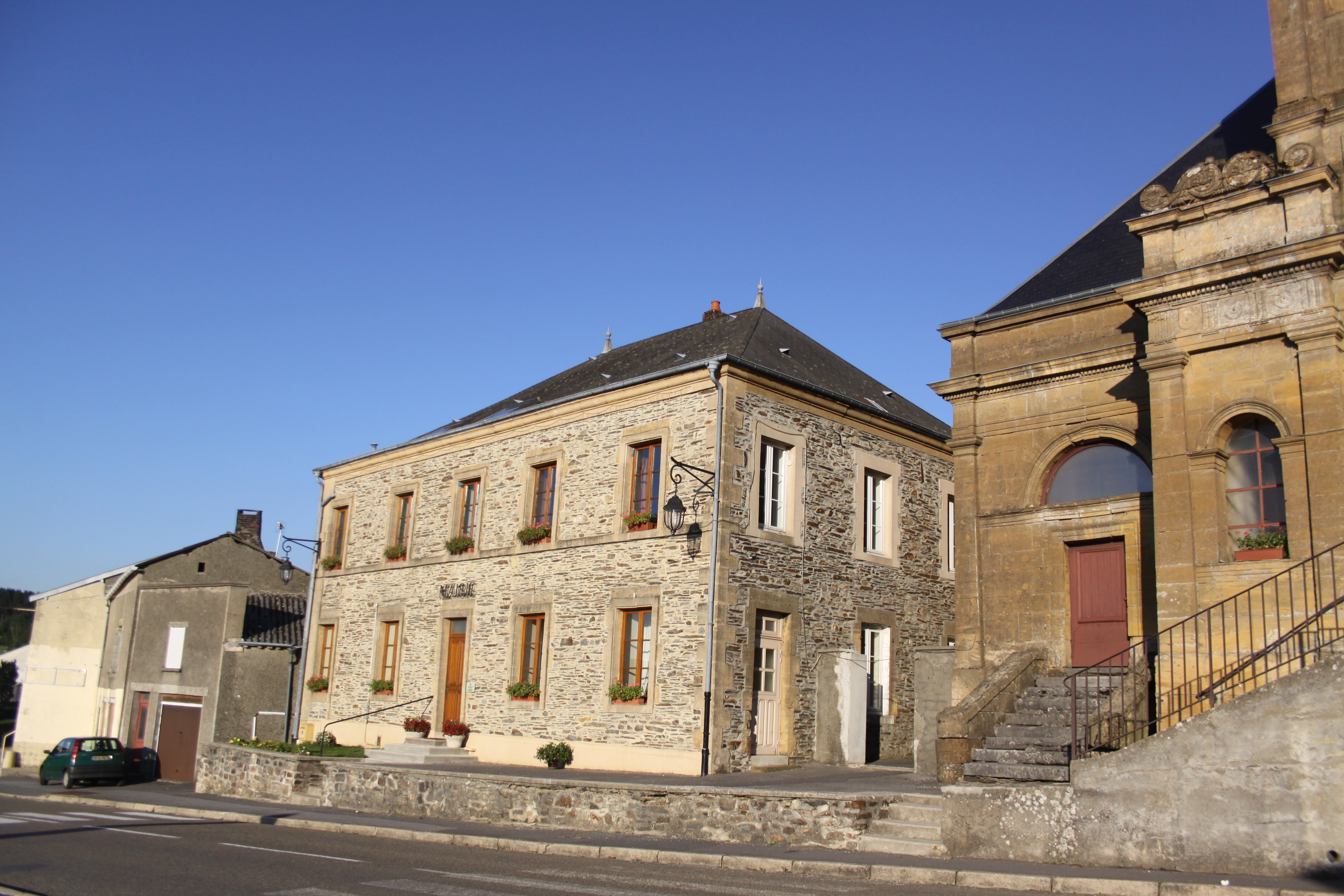
- Town hall

- Coat of arms
- Location of Sécheval
- Location within France Location within Grand Est
- Coordinates: 49°51′35″N 4°39′38″E
- Country: France
- Region: Grand Est
- Department: Ardennes
- Arrondissement: Charleville-Mézières
- Canton: Charleville-Mézières-2
- Intercommunality: CA Ardenne Métropole

Government
  - Mayor (2020–2026): Philippe Canot
- Area^{1}: 13.79 km^{2} (5.32 sq mi)
- Elevation: 261 m (856 ft)
- Population (2023): 517
  - Density: 37.5/km^{2} (97.1/sq mi)
- Time zone: UTC+01:00 (CET)
  - Summer (DST): UTC+02:00 (CEST)
- INSEE/Postal code: 08408 /08150
- ^{1} French Land Register data, which excludes lakes, ponds, glaciers > 1 km^{2} (0.386 sq mi or 247 acres) and river estuaries.

Sécheval is a commune in the Ardennes department in northern France.

== Population ==
Historical population
Year	Pop.	±% p.a.
1968	279	—
1975	321	+2.02%
1982	348	+1.16%
1990	408	+2.01%
1999	395	−0.36%
2007	489	+2.70%
2012	532	+1.70%
2017	554	+0.81%
2023	517	−1.15%
Source: INSEE

== See also ==
- Communes of the Ardennes department
