= Issancourt-et-Rumel =

- Commune
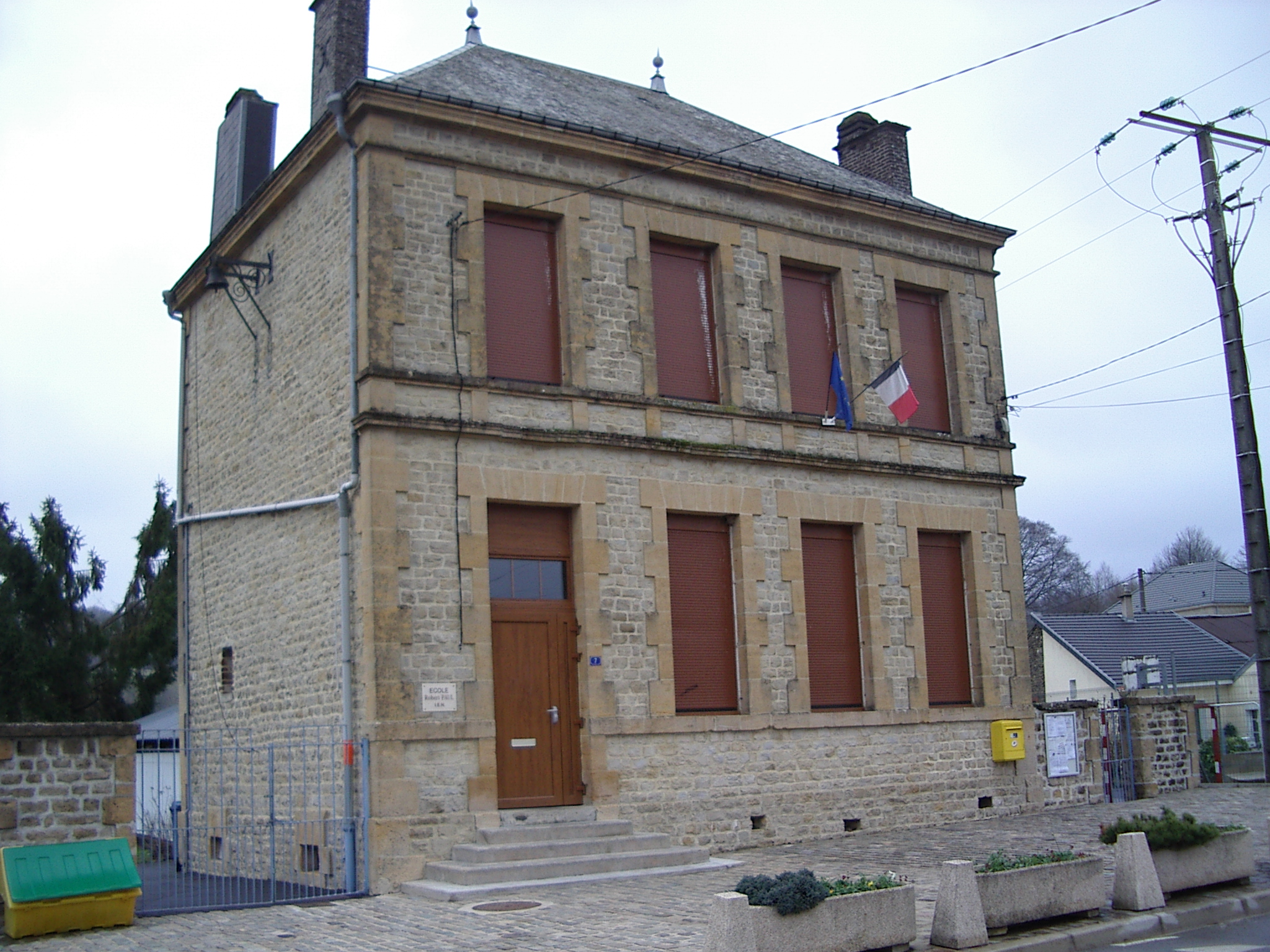
- School

- Coat of arms
- Location of Issancourt-et-Rumel
- Location within France Location within Grand Est
- Coordinates: 49°45′19″N 4°49′23″E
- Country: France
- Region: Grand Est
- Department: Ardennes
- Arrondissement: Charleville-Mézières
- Canton: Villers-Semeuse
- Intercommunality: CA Ardenne Métropole

Government
  - Mayor (2020–2026): Ghislain Debaiffe-Raboin
- Area^{1}: 5.47 km^{2} (2.11 sq mi)
- Elevation: 180 m (590 ft)
- Highest elevation: 273 m (896 ft)
- Lowest elevation: 168 m (551 ft)
- Population (2023): 406
  - Density: 74.2/km^{2} (192/sq mi)
- Time zone: UTC+01:00 (CET)
  - Summer (DST): UTC+02:00 (CEST)
- INSEE/Postal code: 08235 /08440
- ^{1} French Land Register data, which excludes lakes, ponds, glaciers > 1 km^{2} (0.386 sq mi or 247 acres) and river estuaries.

Issancourt-et-Rumel (French pronunciation: [isɑ̃kuʁ e ʁymɛl]) is a commune in the Ardennes department in northern France.

== Population ==
Historical population
Year	Pop.	±% p.a.
1968	381	—
1975	348	−1.29%
1982	390	+1.64%
1990	358	−1.06%
1999	371	+0.40%
2007	404	+1.07%
2012	421	+0.83%
2017	384	−1.82%
2023	406	+0.93%
Source: INSEE

== See also ==
- Communes of the Ardennes department
