= Aiglemont =

- Commune
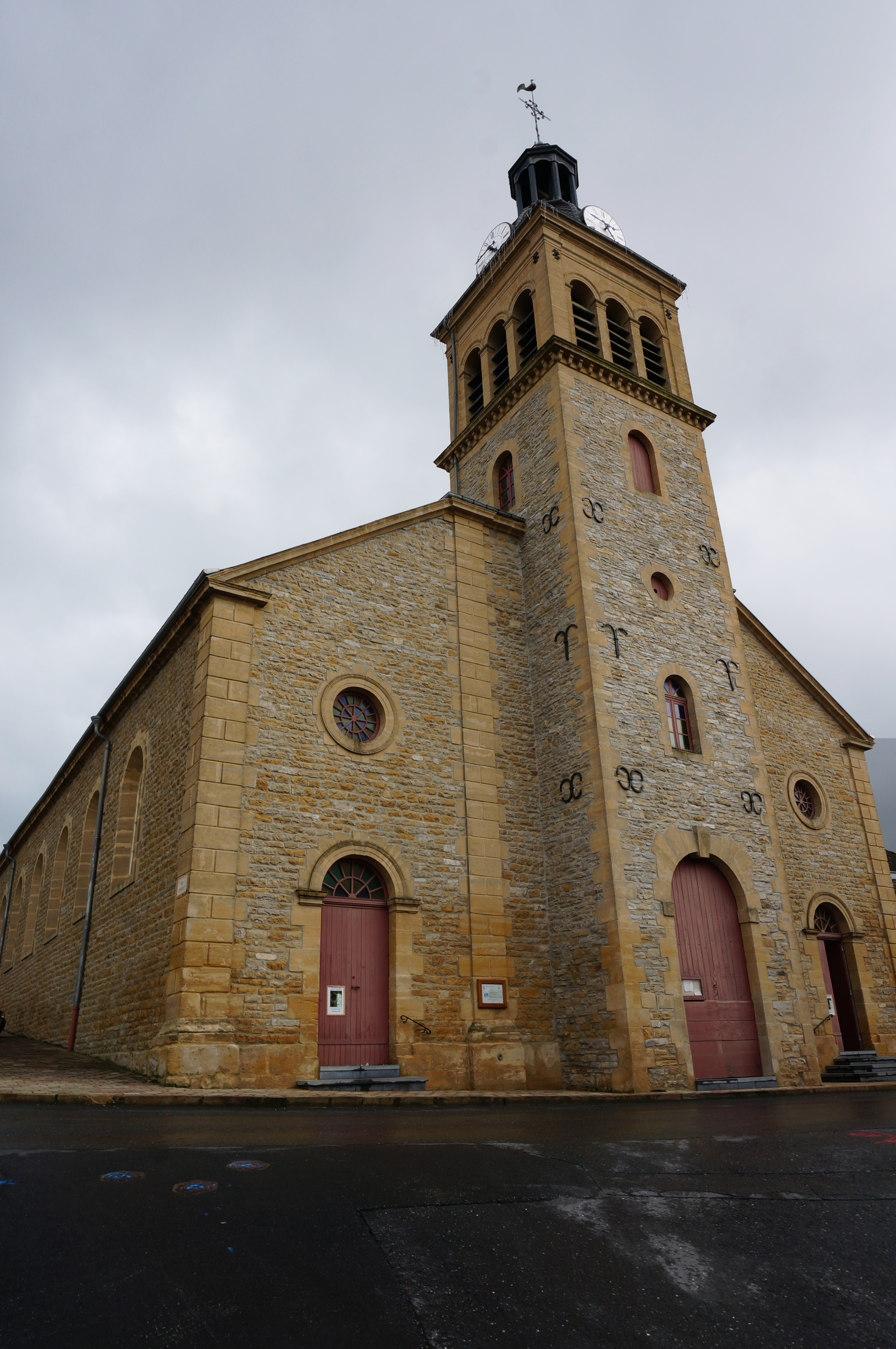
- The church in Aiglemont

- Coat of arms
- Location of Aiglemont
- Location within France Location within Grand Est
- Coordinates: 49°46′56″N 4°46′00″E
- Country: France
- Region: Grand Est
- Department: Ardennes
- Arrondissement: Charleville-Mézières
- Canton: Villers-Semeuse
- Intercommunality: Ardenne Métropole

Government
  - Mayor (2020–2026): Philippe Décobert
- Area^{1}: 8.85 km^{2} (3.42 sq mi)
- Elevation: 245 m (804 ft)
- Highest elevation: 327 m (1,073 ft)
- Lowest elevation: 132 m (433 ft)
- Population (2023): 1,692
  - Density: 191/km^{2} (495/sq mi)
- Time zone: UTC+01:00 (CET)
  - Summer (DST): UTC+02:00 (CEST)
- INSEE/Postal code: 08003 /08090
- ^{1} French Land Register data, which excludes lakes, ponds, glaciers > 1 km^{2} (0.386 sq mi or 247 acres) and river estuaries.

Aiglemont (French pronunciation: [ɛɡləmɔ̃]) is a commune in the Ardennes department in France.

== Population ==
Historical population
| Year | Pop. | ±% p.a. |
|---|---|---|
| 1968 | 1,304 | — |
| 1975 | 1,645 | +3.37% |
| 1982 | 1,614 | −0.27% |
| 1990 | 1,804 | +1.40% |
| 1999 | 1,733 | −0.45% |
| 2007 | 1,575 | −1.19% |
| 2012 | 1,660 | +1.06% |
| 2017 | 1,634 | −0.32% |
| 2023 | 1,692 | +0.58% |
Source: INSEE

== See also ==
- Communes of the Ardennes department
