= Bosseval-et-Briancourt =

- Part of Vrigne-aux-Bois
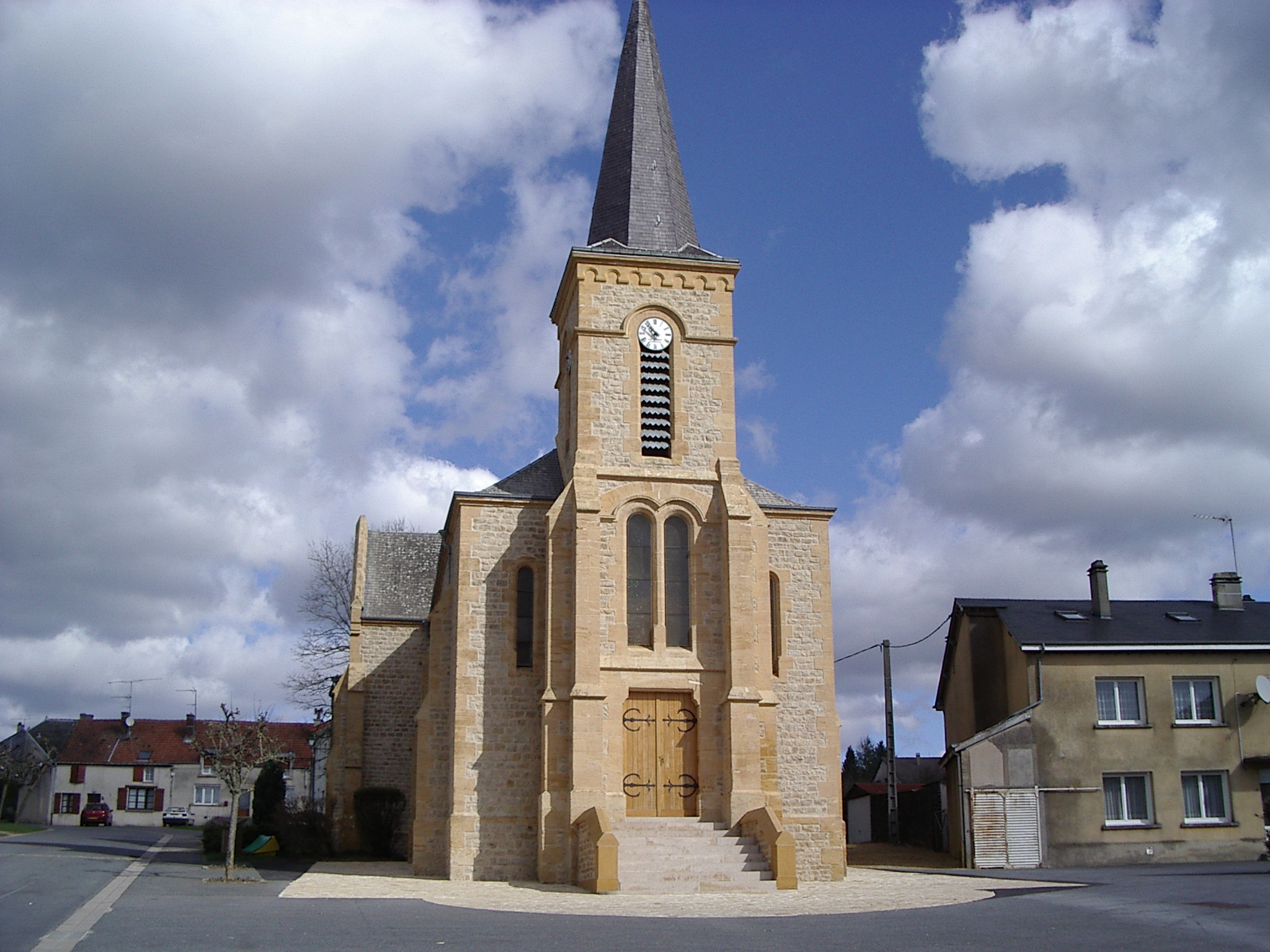

- Coat of arms
- Location of Bosseval-et-Briancourt
- Location within France Location within Grand Est
- Coordinates: 49°45′20″N 4°52′34″E
- Country: France
- Region: Grand Est
- Department: Ardennes
- Arrondissement: Sedan
- Canton: Sedan-1
- Commune: Vrigne-aux-Bois
- Area^{1}: 14.53 km^{2} (5.61 sq mi)
- Elevation: 250 m (820 ft)
- Highest elevation: 390 m (1,280 ft)
- Lowest elevation: 166 m (545 ft)
- Population (2023): 393
  - Density: 27.0/km^{2} (70.1/sq mi)
- Time zone: UTC+01:00 (CET)
  - Summer (DST): UTC+02:00 (CEST)
- Postal code: 08350
- ^{1} French Land Register data, which excludes lakes, ponds, glaciers > 1 km^{2} (0.386 sq mi or 247 acres) and river estuaries.

Bosseval-et-Briancourt (French pronunciation: [bɔsval e bʁijɑ̃kuʁ]) is a former commune in the Ardennes department in northern France. On 1 January 2017, it was merged into the commune Vrigne-aux-Bois.

== See also ==
- Communes of the Ardennes department
