= Ardenne Métropole =

Coordinates: 49°43′N 04°50′E

- Communauté d'agglomération
- Country: France
- Region: Grand Est
- Department: Ardennes
- No. of communes: {{{nbcomm}}}
- Established: 2014
- Area: 568.0 km^{2} (219.3 sq mi)
- Population (2017): 122,016
  - Density: 214.8/km^{2} (556.4/sq mi)
- Website: ardenne-metropole.fr

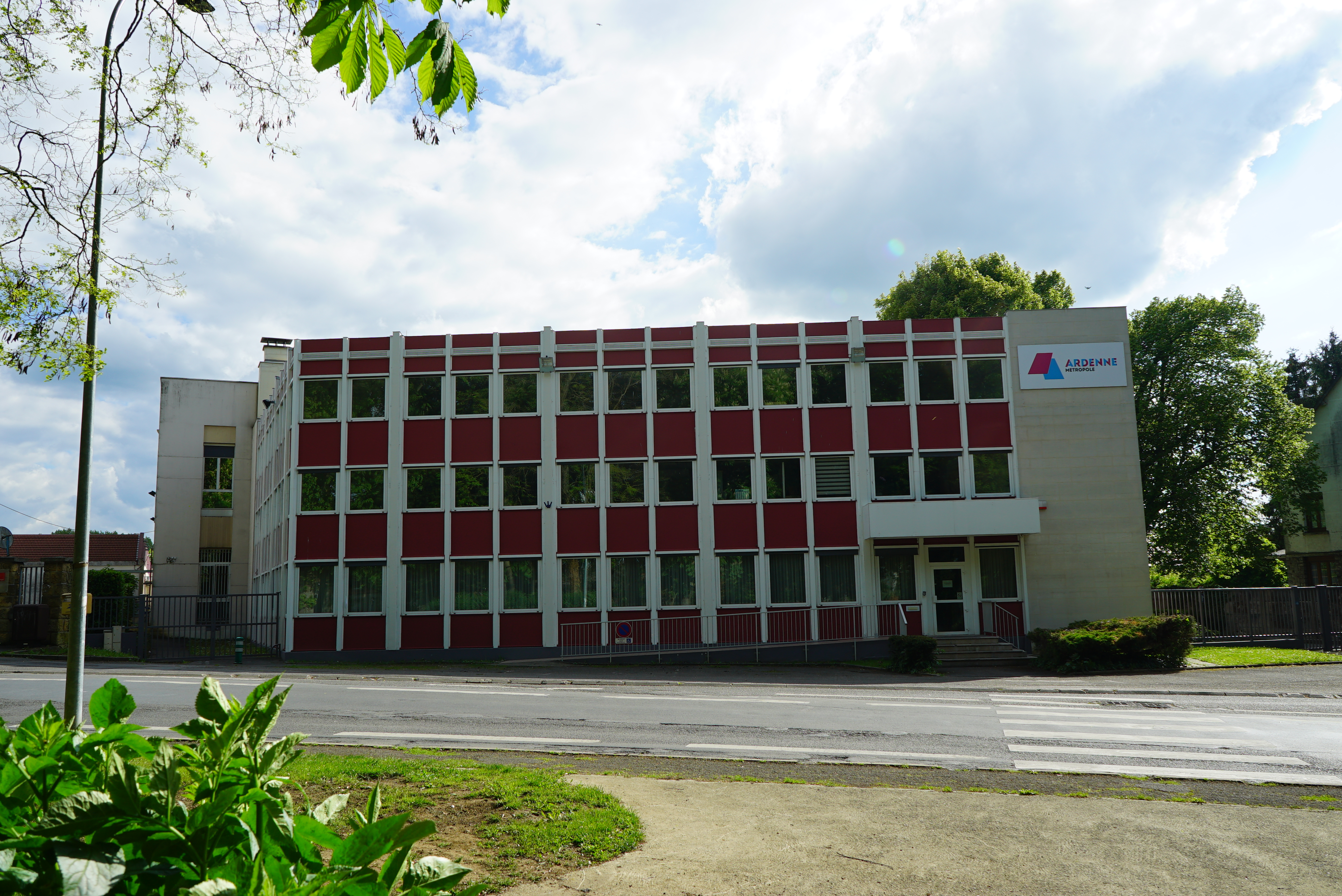
Ardenne Métropole - 2015

Ardenne Métropole is the communauté d'agglomération, an intercommunal structure, centred on the cities of Charleville-Mézières and Sedan. It is located in the Ardennes department, in the Grand Est region, northern France. It was created as Communauté d'agglomération de Charleville-Mézières-Sedan in January 2014 by the merger of the former Communauté d'agglomération Cœur d'Ardenne with 3 former communautés de communes and 12 other communes. Its seat is in Charleville-Mézières. The communauté d'agglomération was renamed Ardenne Métropole in January 2017. Its population was 122,016 in 2017, of which 46,428 in Charleville-Mézières.

== Composition ==
The communauté d'agglomération consists of the following 58 communes:

1. Aiglemont
2. Arreux
3. Les Ayvelles
4. Balan
5. Bazeilles
6. Belval
7. Chalandry-Elaire
8. La Chapelle
9. Charleville-Mézières
10. Cheveuges
11. Cliron
12. Daigny
13. Damouzy
14. Dom-le-Mesnil
15. Donchery
16. Étrépigny
17. Fagnon
18. Fleigneux
19. Flize
20. Floing
21. Francheval
22. La Francheville
23. Gernelle
24. Gespunsart
25. Givonne
26. Glaire
27. La Grandville
28. Hannogne-Saint-Martin
29. Haudrecy
30. Houldizy
31. Illy
32. Issancourt-et-Rumel
33. Lumes
34. Montcy-Notre-Dame
35. Neufmanil
36. Nouvion-sur-Meuse
37. Nouzonville
38. Noyers-Pont-Maugis
39. Pouru-aux-Bois
40. Pouru-Saint-Remy
41. Prix-lès-Mézières
42. Saint-Aignan
43. Saint-Laurent
44. Saint-Menges
45. Sapogne-et-Feuchères
46. Sécheval
47. Sedan
48. Thelonne
49. Tournes
50. Villers-Semeuse
51. Villers-sur-Bar
52. Ville-sur-Lumes
53. Vivier-au-Court
54. Vrigne-aux-Bois
55. Vrigne-Meuse
56. Wadelincourt
57. Warcq
