= Neufmanil =

- Commune
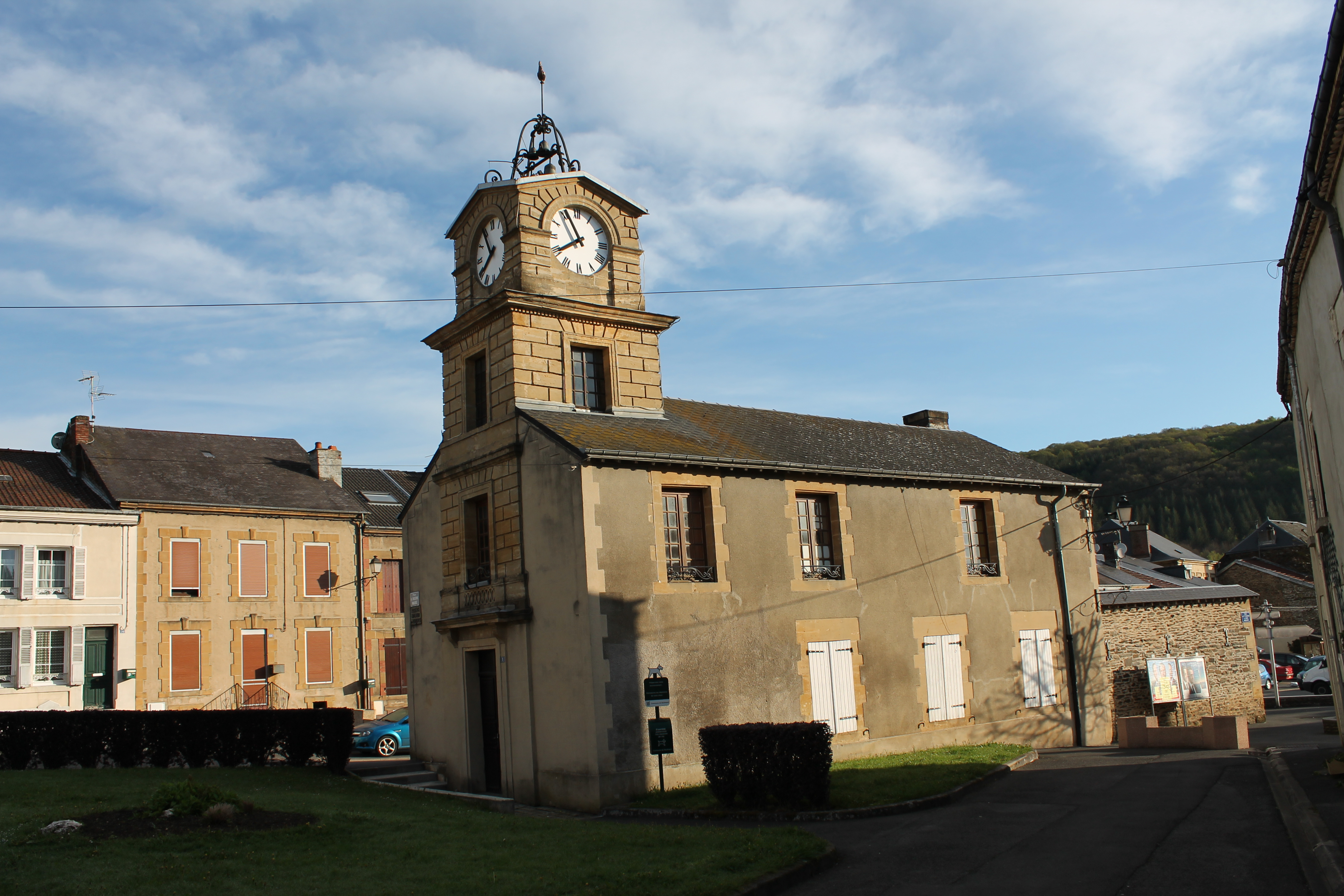
- Former town hall

- Coat of arms
- Location of Neufmanil
- Location within France Location within Grand Est
- Coordinates: 49°48′38″N 4°47′41″E
- Country: France
- Region: Grand Est
- Department: Ardennes
- Arrondissement: Charleville-Mézières
- Canton: Villers-Semeuse
- Intercommunality: CA Ardenne Métropole

Government
  - Mayor (2020–2026): Dominique Wafflard
- Area^{1}: 10.2 km^{2} (3.9 sq mi)
- Population (2023): 985
  - Density: 96.6/km^{2} (250/sq mi)
- Time zone: UTC+01:00 (CET)
  - Summer (DST): UTC+02:00 (CEST)
- INSEE/Postal code: 08316 /08700
- ^{1} French Land Register data, which excludes lakes, ponds, glaciers > 1 km^{2} (0.386 sq mi or 247 acres) and river estuaries.

Neufmanil (French pronunciation: [nœfmanil]) is a commune in the Ardennes department in the Grand Est region in Northern France. As of 2023, the population of the commune was 985.

== Geography ==
Neufmanil is a commune in the Ardennes department located 7 km northeast of Charleville-Mézières and 7 km from the Belgian border. It is crossed by the Goutelle River.

== History ==
The first mention of the town dates back to the 9th century, when it became part of the Holy Roman Empire. Neufmanil returned to France in 1769. The town was occupied during World War I and World War II.

== See also ==
- Communes of the Ardennes department
