= Villers-Semeuse =

- Commune
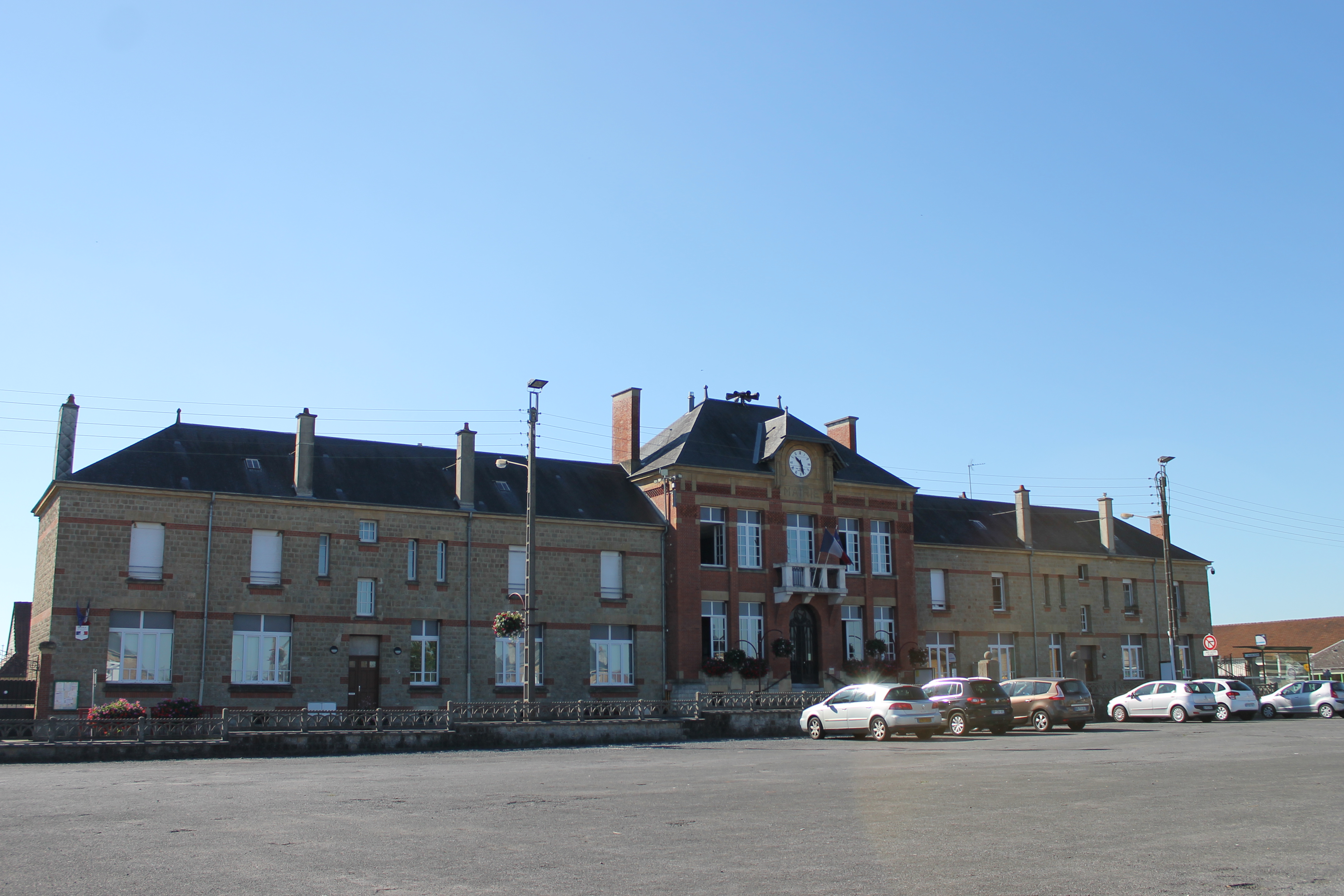
- The town hall in Villers-Semeuse

- Coat of arms
- Location of Villers-Semeuse
- Location within France Location within Grand Est
- Coordinates: 49°44′31″N 4°44′44″E
- Country: France
- Region: Grand Est
- Department: Ardennes
- Arrondissement: Charleville-Mézières
- Canton: Villers-Semeuse
- Intercommunality: CA Ardenne Métropole

Government
  - Mayor (2020–2026): Jérémy Dupuy
- Area^{1}: 7.03 km^{2} (2.71 sq mi)
- Population (2023): 3,615
  - Density: 514/km^{2} (1,330/sq mi)
- Time zone: UTC+01:00 (CET)
  - Summer (DST): UTC+02:00 (CEST)
- INSEE/Postal code: 08480 /08000
- ^{1} French Land Register data, which excludes lakes, ponds, glaciers > 1 km^{2} (0.386 sq mi or 247 acres) and river estuaries.

Villers-Semeuse (French pronunciation: [vile səmøz]) is a commune in the Ardennes department in northern France.

== Population ==
Historical population

Year	Pop.	±% p.a.
1793	207	—
1800	191	−1.14%
1806	196	+0.43%
1821	218	+0.71%
1831	345	+4.70%
1836	346	+0.06%
1841	357	+0.63%
1846	398	+2.20%
1851	407	+0.45%
1866	705	+3.73%
1872	800	+2.13%
1876	902	+3.05%
1881	1,254	+6.81%
1886	1,090	−2.76%
1891	1,173	+1.48%
1896	1,444	+4.24%
1901	1,541	+1.31%
1906	1,826	+3.45%

Year	Pop.	±% p.a.
1911	2,066	+2.50%
1921	2,172	+0.50%
1926	2,711	+4.53%
1931	2,802	+0.66%
1936	2,740	−0.45%
1946	2,372	−1.43%
1954	3,022	+3.07%
1962	3,389	+1.44%
1968	3,358	−0.15%
1975	3,193	−0.72%
1982	3,074	−0.54%
1990	3,595	+1.98%
1999	3,521	−0.23%
2007	3,179	−1.27%
2012	3,599	+2.51%
2017	3,604	+0.03%
2023	3,615	+0.05%

Source: EHESS and INSEE (1968-2023)

== Notable people ==
This is a list of people of interest who were born or lived in Villers Semeuse:

- Jean-Pierre Brunois, entrepreneur
- Roger Marche, footballer

== See also ==
- Communes of the Ardennes department
