= Nouzonville =

- Commune
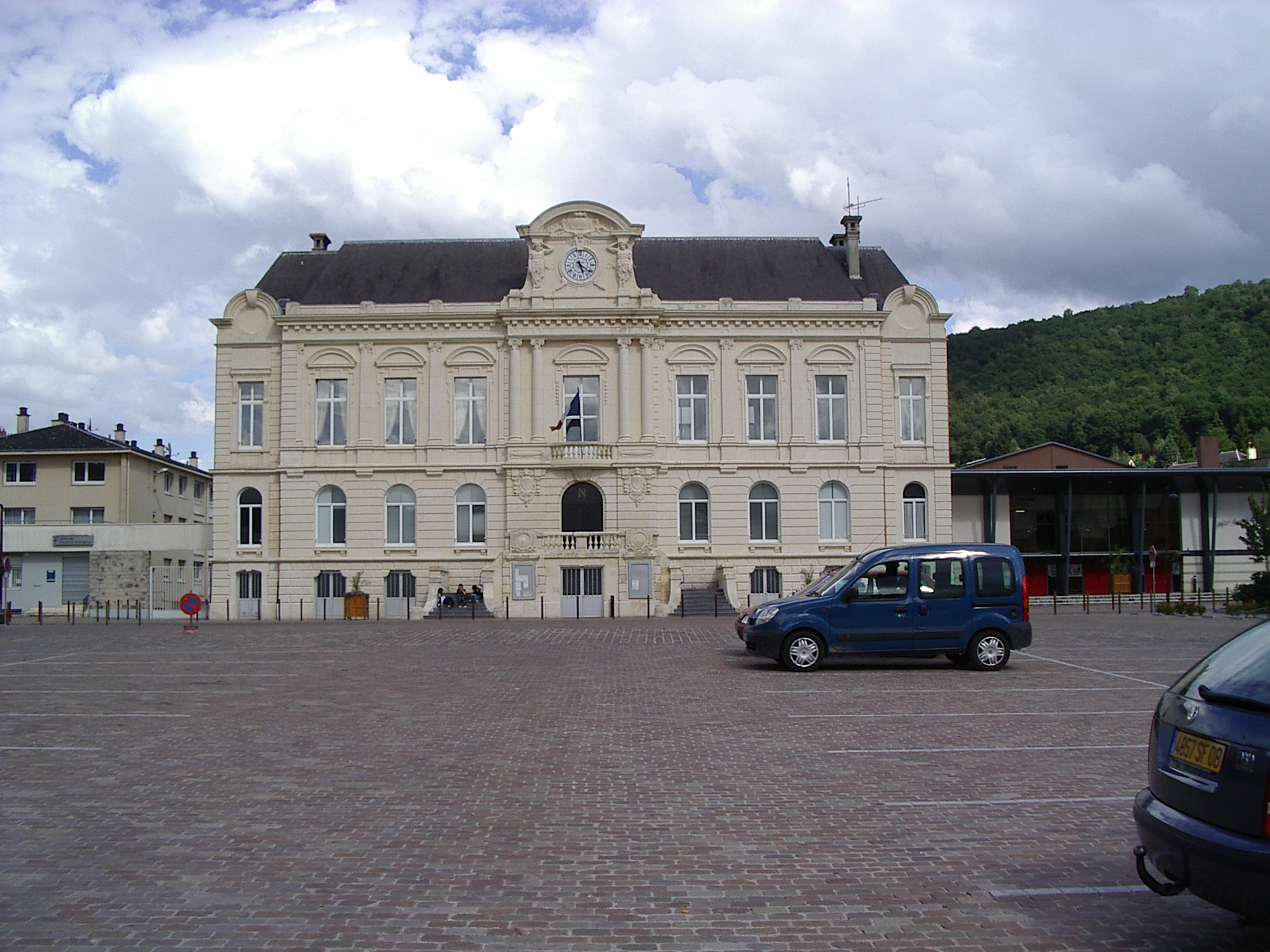
- Town hall

- Coat of arms
- Location of Nouzonville
- Location within France Location within Grand Est
- Coordinates: 49°48′57″N 4°44′45″E
- Country: France
- Region: Grand Est
- Department: Ardennes
- Arrondissement: Charleville-Mézières
- Canton: Charleville-Mézières-2
- Intercommunality: CA Ardenne Métropole

Government
  - Mayor (2020–2026): Florian Lecoultre
- Area^{1}: 10.92 km^{2} (4.22 sq mi)
- Elevation: 143 m (469 ft)
- Highest elevation: 361 m (1,184 ft)
- Lowest elevation: 132 m (433 ft)
- Population (2023): 5,523
  - Density: 505.8/km^{2} (1,310/sq mi)
- Time zone: UTC+01:00 (CET)
  - Summer (DST): UTC+02:00 (CEST)
- INSEE/Postal code: 08328 /08700
- ^{1} French Land Register data, which excludes lakes, ponds, glaciers > 1 km^{2} (0.386 sq mi or 247 acres) and river estuaries.

Nouzonville (French pronunciation: [nuzɔ̃vil]) is a commune in the Ardennes department in northern France.

== Population ==
Historical population

Year	Pop.	±% p.a.
1793	856	—
1800	962	+1.68%
1806	1,208	+3.87%
1821	1,417	+1.07%
1831	1,803	+2.44%
1836	2,050	+2.60%
1841	2,153	+0.99%
1846	2,575	+3.64%
1851	2,535	−0.31%
1866	4,022	+3.13%
1872	5,164	+4.25%
1876	5,411	+1.17%
1881	7,069	+5.49%
1886	6,992	−0.22%
1891	6,741	−0.73%
1896	6,603	−0.41%
1901	7,795	+3.37%
1906	7,574	−0.57%

Year	Pop.	±% p.a.
1911	7,815	+0.63%
1921	6,591	−1.69%
1926	6,848	+0.77%
1931	7,119	+0.78%
1936	6,198	−2.73%
1946	4,657	−2.82%
1954	6,155	+3.55%
1962	6,954	+1.54%
1968	7,798	+1.93%
1975	7,797	−0.00%
1982	7,355	−0.83%
1990	6,970	−0.67%
1999	6,869	−0.16%
2007	6,390	−0.90%
2012	6,197	−0.61%
2017	5,836	−1.19%
2023	5,523	−0.91%

Source: EHESS and INSEE (1968-2023)

== See also ==
- Communes of the Ardennes department
