= Gespunsart =

- Commune
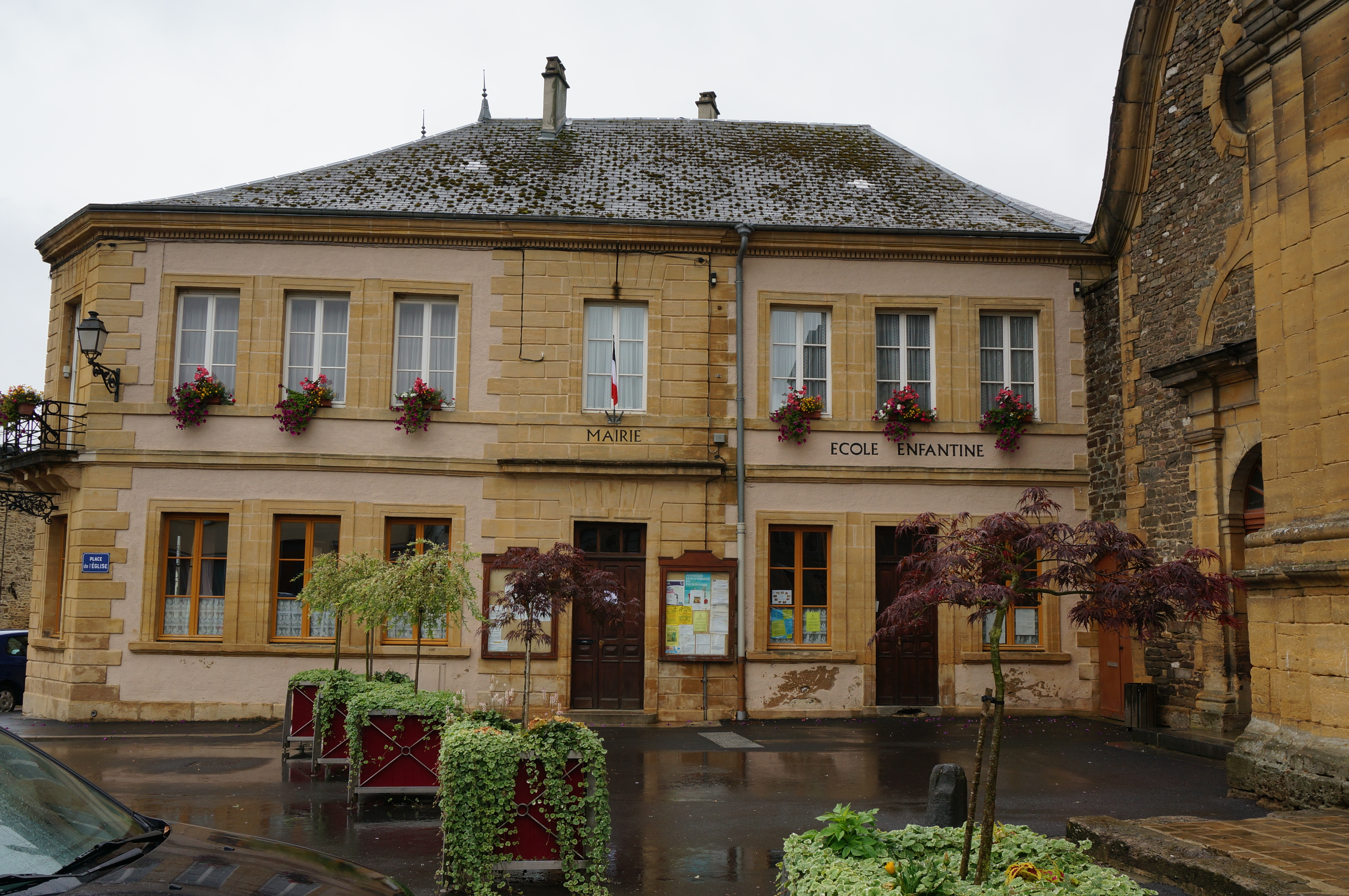
- The town hall in Gespunsart

- Coat of arms
- Location of Gespunsart
- Location within France Location within Grand Est
- Coordinates: 49°49′20″N 4°49′46″E
- Country: France
- Region: Grand Est
- Department: Ardennes
- Arrondissement: Charleville-Mézières
- Canton: Villers-Semeuse
- Intercommunality: CA Ardenne Métropole

Government
  - Mayor (2020–2026): Gilles Michel
- Area^{1}: 21.02 km^{2} (8.12 sq mi)
- Elevation: 198 m (650 ft)
- Population (2023): 954
  - Density: 45.4/km^{2} (118/sq mi)
- Time zone: UTC+01:00 (CET)
  - Summer (DST): UTC+02:00 (CEST)
- INSEE/Postal code: 08188 /08700
- ^{1} French Land Register data, which excludes lakes, ponds, glaciers > 1 km^{2} (0.386 sq mi or 247 acres) and river estuaries.

Gespunsart (French pronunciation: [ʒɛspœ̃saʁ]) is a commune in the Ardennes department in northern France.

== Population ==
Historical population
Year	Pop.	±% p.a.
1968	1,287	—
1975	1,163	−1.44%
1982	1,176	+0.16%
1990	1,141	−0.38%
1999	1,125	−0.16%
2007	1,153	+0.31%
2012	1,109	−0.78%
2017	1,057	−0.96%
2023	954	−1.69%
Source: INSEE

== See also ==
- Communes of the Ardennes department
