= Saint-Laurent, Ardennes =

Saint-Laurent
- Commune
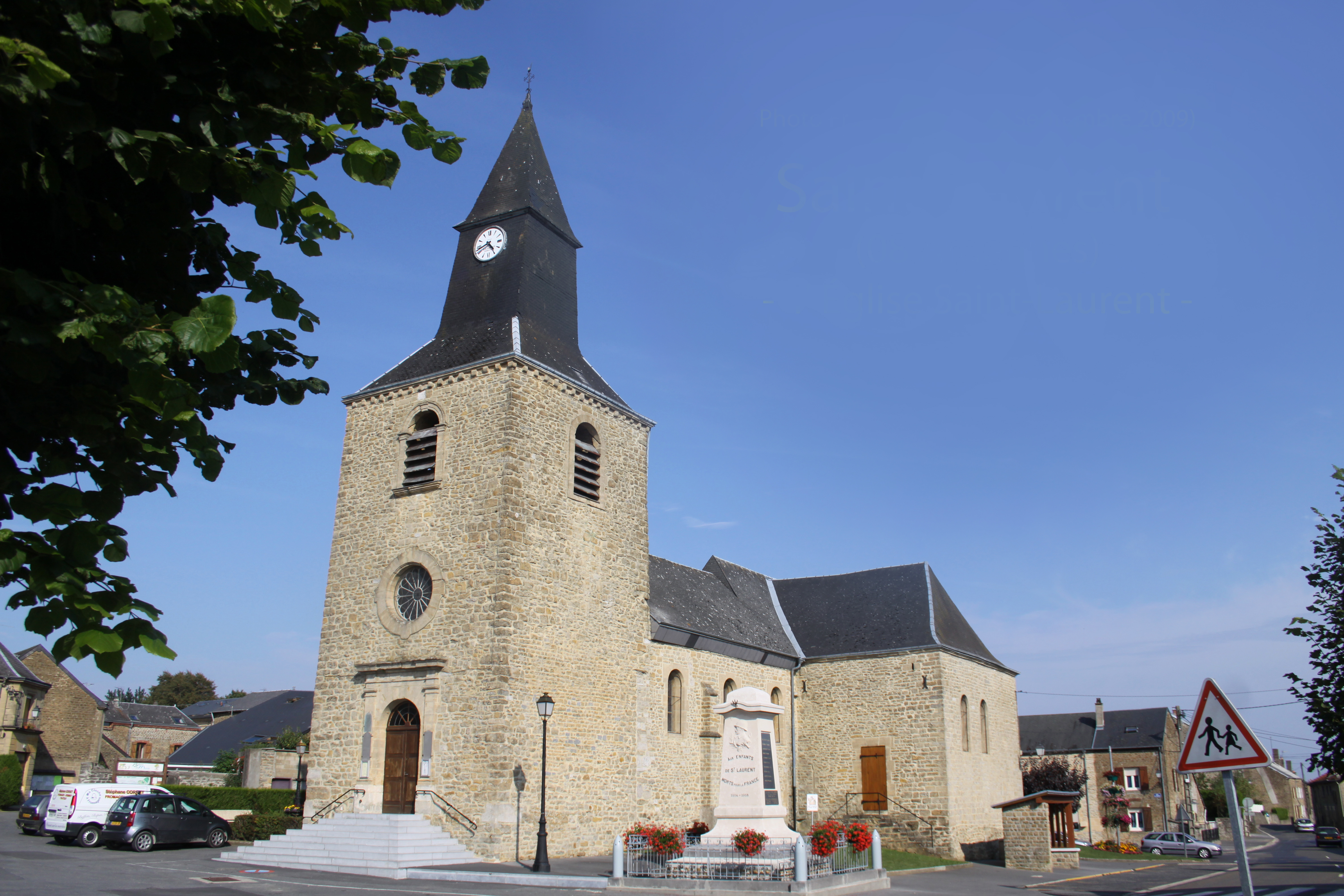
- The church in Saint-Laurent
- Location of Saint-Laurent
- Location within France Location within Grand Est
- Coordinates: 49°45′51″N 4°46′18″E
- Country: France
- Region: Grand Est
- Department: Ardennes
- Arrondissement: Charleville-Mézières
- Canton: Villers-Semeuse
- Intercommunality: CA Ardenne Métropole

Government
  - Mayor (2020–2026): Laurent Forget
- Area^{1}: 4.26 km^{2} (1.64 sq mi)
- Elevation: 250 m (820 ft)
- Highest elevation: 289 m (948 ft)
- Lowest elevation: 142 m (466 ft)
- Population (2023): 1,050
  - Density: 246/km^{2} (638/sq mi)
- Time zone: UTC+01:00 (CET)
  - Summer (DST): UTC+02:00 (CEST)
- INSEE/Postal code: 08385 /08090
- ^{1} French Land Register data, which excludes lakes, ponds, glaciers > 1 km^{2} (0.386 sq mi or 247 acres) and river estuaries.

Saint-Laurent (French pronunciation: [sɛ̃ lɔʁɑ̃]) is a commune in the Ardennes department in northern France.

== Population ==
Historical population
Year	Pop.	±% p.a.
1968	612	—
1975	727	+2.49%
1982	805	+1.47%
1990	902	+1.43%
1999	910	+0.10%
2007	1,193	+3.44%
2012	1,167	−0.44%
2017	1,104	−1.10%
2023	1,050	−0.83%
Source: INSEE

== See also ==
- Communes of the Ardennes department
