= Vrigne-aux-Bois =

- Commune
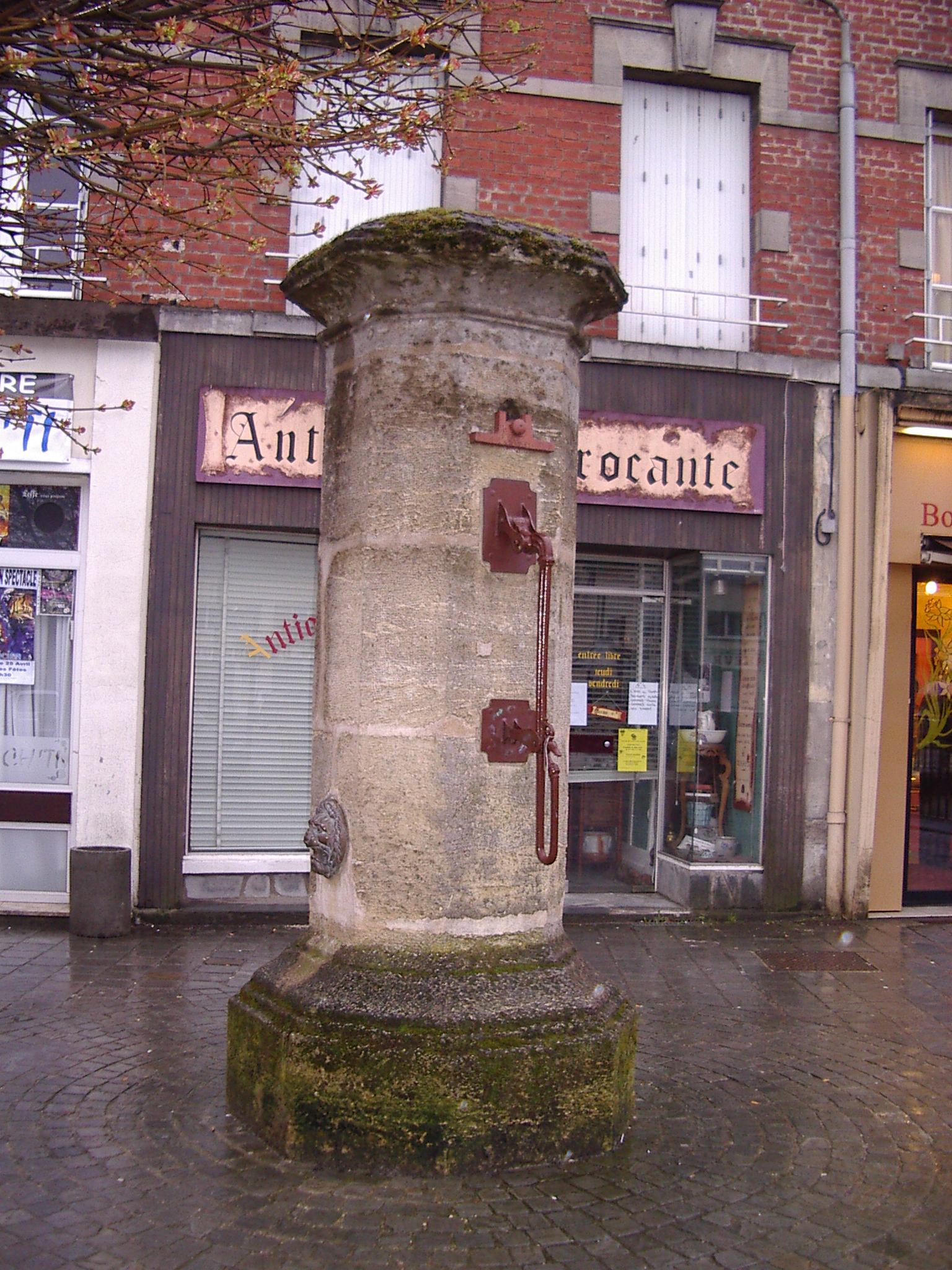
- Old fountain

- Coat of arms
- Location of Vrigne-aux-Bois
- Location within France Location within Grand Est
- Coordinates: 49°44′18″N 4°51′24″E
- Country: France
- Region: Grand Est
- Department: Ardennes
- Arrondissement: Sedan
- Canton: Sedan-1
- Intercommunality: Ardenne Métropole

Government
  - Mayor (2020–2026): Patrick Dutertre
- Area^{1}: 22.57 km^{2} (8.71 sq mi)
- Elevation: 160 m (520 ft)
- Population (2023): 3,518
  - Density: 155.9/km^{2} (403.7/sq mi)
- Time zone: UTC+01:00 (CET)
  - Summer (DST): UTC+02:00 (CEST)
- INSEE/Postal code: 08491 /08330
- ^{1} French Land Register data, which excludes lakes, ponds, glaciers > 1 km^{2} (0.386 sq mi or 247 acres) and river estuaries.

Vrigne-aux-Bois is a commune in the Ardennes department in northern France. It is located 14 kilometers from the neighboring town of Sedan. On 1 January 2017, the former commune of Bosseval-et-Briancourt was merged into Vrigne-aux-Bois.

== Population ==
Population data refer to the commune in its geography as of January 2025.

Historical population
Year	Pop.	±% p.a.
1968	4,078	—
1975	4,125	+0.16%
1982	4,228	+0.35%
1990	4,121	−0.32%
1999	4,071	−0.14%
2007	3,925	−0.46%
2012	3,785	−0.72%
2017	3,623	−0.87%
2023	3,518	−0.49%
Source: INSEE

== See also ==
- Communes of the Ardennes department
