= Lumes =

- Commune
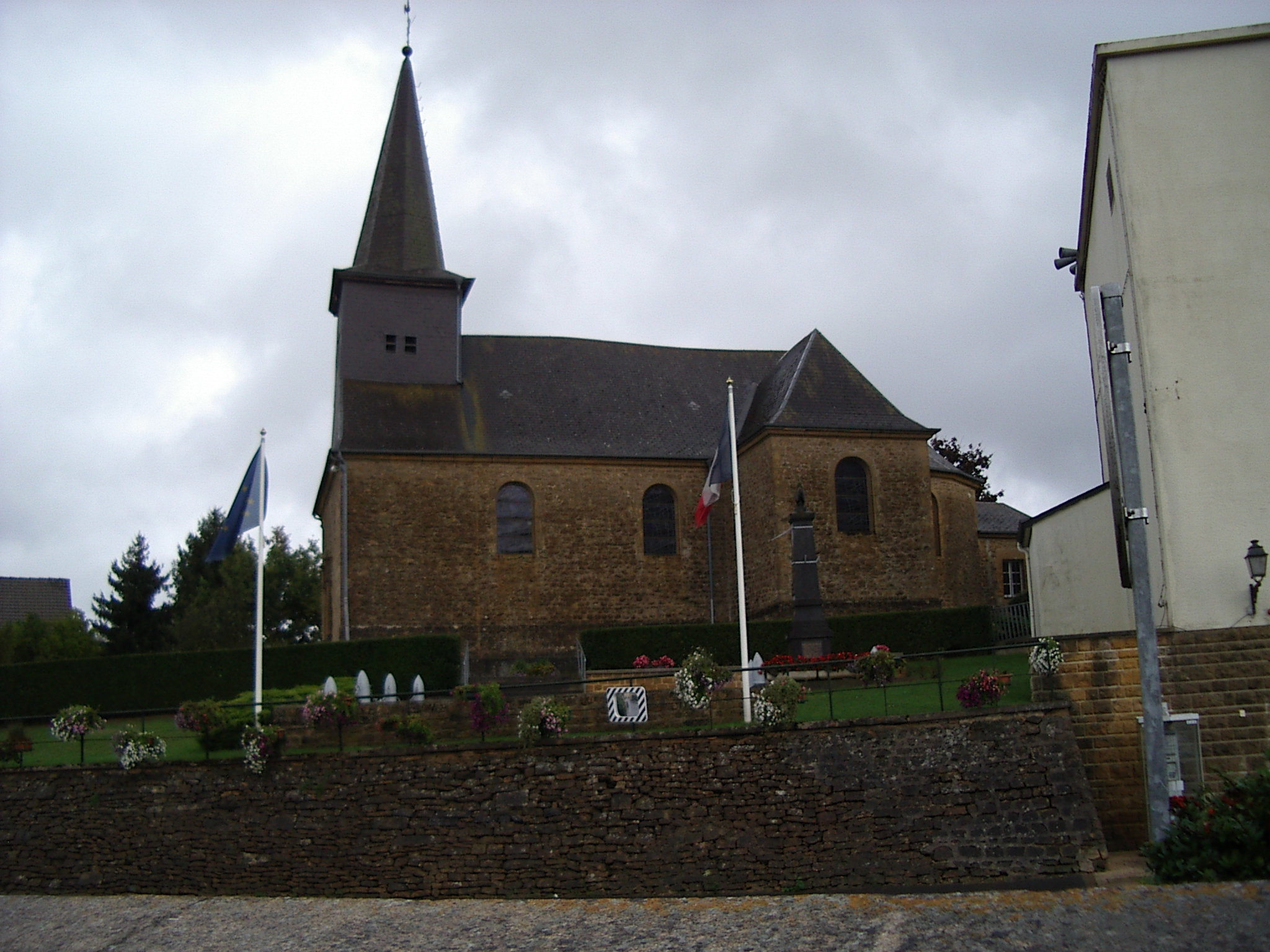
- The church in Lumes

- Coat of arms
- Location of Lumes
- Location within France Location within Grand Est
- Coordinates: 49°44′09″N 4°47′05″E
- Country: France
- Region: Grand Est
- Department: Ardennes
- Arrondissement: Charleville-Mézières
- Canton: Villers-Semeuse
- Intercommunality: CA Ardenne Métropole

Government
  - Mayor (2020–2026): Olivier Petitfrère
- Area^{1}: 6.14 km^{2} (2.37 sq mi)
- Elevation: 152 m (499 ft)
- Highest elevation: 252 m (827 ft)
- Lowest elevation: 143 m (469 ft)
- Population (2023): 1,099
  - Density: 179/km^{2} (464/sq mi)
- Time zone: UTC+01:00 (CET)
  - Summer (DST): UTC+02:00 (CEST)
- INSEE/Postal code: 08263 /08440
- ^{1} French Land Register data, which excludes lakes, ponds, glaciers > 1 km^{2} (0.386 sq mi or 247 acres) and river estuaries.

Lumes (French pronunciation: [lym]) is a commune in the Ardennes department in northern France.

== Population ==
Historical population
Year	Pop.	±% p.a.
1968	951	—
1975	963	+0.18%
1982	1,116	+2.13%
1990	1,251	+1.44%
1999	1,224	−0.24%
2007	1,133	−0.96%
2012	1,161	+0.49%
2017	1,142	−0.33%
2023	1,099	−0.64%
Source: INSEE

== See also ==
- Communes of the Ardennes department
