= Pajetta =

Pajetta is a surname. Notable people with the surname include:

- Giancarlo Pajetta (1911–1990), Italian politician
- Mariano Pajetta (1851–1923), Italian painter, brother of Pietro
- Pietro Pajetta (1845–1911), Italian painter

== See also ==
- Paletta
- Panetta
