= Balani (surname) =

Balani is a Sindhi surname. Notable people with the surname include:

- Anant Balani (1962–2003), Indian film director and screenwriter
- Bherulal Balani, Pakistani MPA of Provincial Assembly of Sindh
- Sonia Balani (born 1991), Indian actress and model

== See also ==
- Bal (disambiguation)
- Bala (disambiguation)
- Balan (disambiguation)
