= Bala =

Bala may refer to:

== Films ==
- Bala (1976 film), an English-language dance documentary
- Bala (2002 film), a Tamil-language action film
- Bala (2019 film), a Hindi-language black comedy

== Life forms ==
- Bala shark (Balantiocheilos melanopterus), a small freshwater fish of Southeast Asia
- Sida cordifolia (or bala), an Indian medicinal subshrub

== People and characters ==
- Bala (name), list of people so named
- Princess Bala, from 1998 animated film Antz
- Bala, from the Devi comic book

== Places ==
=== Africa ===
- Bala, Senegal

=== Asia ===
- Bal'a, West Bank, Palestine
- Bala, Ankara, Turkey
- Bala, Nepal
- Bala, Russia, a selo in Sakha Republic
- Bala, India, in Allahabad
- Bala, Raebareli, Uttar Pradesh, India
- Bala, Ahor, Rajasthan, India

=== Europe ===
- Bala, Gwynedd, Wales
  - Bala Lake, Wales' largest natural lake
  - Bala Series of geologic beds
- Bala, Mehedinți, Oltenia, Romania
- Băla (Hungarian: Bala), Mureș, Transylvania, Romania
- Rodopoli, former name Μπάλα - Bala, a municipal unit in Greece

=== North America ===
- Bala, Kansas, United States
- Bala Cynwyd, Pennsylvania, United States
- Bala, Ontario, Canada
  - Bala Aerodrome

== Religion ==
- Five Strengths, or bala, in Buddhism
- Bala Tripurasundari, a Hindu child goddess
- Bala Ganapati, an aspect of the Hindu god Ganesha
- Bala Kanda, the first book of Ramayana, an ancient Indian epic poem

== Other uses ==
- Bala (band), a Galician stoner rock music group
- Bala language, spoken in the Congo
- Bala language (China), a possibly extinct Tungusic language
- Bala taxation, a system used in the Ur III dynasty of Mesopotamia

== See also ==
- Bal (disambiguation)
- Balan (disambiguation)
- Balla (disambiguation)
- Bala station (disambiguation), stations of the name
- Bala Hissar (disambiguation), places of the name
- Bala Nagamma (disambiguation)
