= Balani =

Balani may refer to:

- Balani show, a Malian block party trend and EDM genre
- Hemioniscus balani, a crustacean
- Balani, a small balafon
- Bălani, a village in Stănești, Gorj, Romania
- Bālānī, an alternative name for Baraniha, Golestan, Iran
- Balani (surname)

== See also ==
- Balan (disambiguation)
- Bologna (disambiguation)
