= Balan, Iran =

Balan (Persian: بالان) may refer to:

- Balan, Kaleybar, East Azerbaijan Province
- Balan, Abish Ahmad, Kaleybar County, East Azerbaijan Province
- Balan-e Safar Ali, East Azerbaijan Province
- Balan, Isfahan
- Balan, Nain, Isfahan Province
- Balan, Markazi
- Balan, West Azerbaijan
