= Balan (surname) =

Bălan is a Romanian surname, Balan a Bulgarian, Indian and Italian one. Notable people with these surnames include:

== Balan ==
- Aleksandar Teodorov-Balan (1859–1959), Bulgarian linguist
- Aparna Balan (born 1986), Indian Badminton player
- Pallipram Balan (born 1939), Indian politician
- Pietro Balan (1840–1893), Italian Catholic historian
- Vidya Balan (born 1979), Bollywood actress

== Bălan ==
- Bogdan Bălan (born 1979), Romanian rugby player
- Dan Bălan (born 1979), Moldavian pop singer and songwriter
- Daniel Bălan (born 1979), Romanian football (soccer) player
- Eugen Bălan (1904–1968), Romanian writer
- Grigore Bălan (1896–1944), Romanian general
- Ioan Bălan (11 February 1880 – 4 August 1959), Romanian bishop of the Greek-Catholic Church, beatified personally by Pope Francis at Liberty Field in Blaj, Romania on 2 June 2019
- Ioana M. Bălan (born 1970), Romanian university professor, niece of Bishop Ioan Bălan
- Lucian Bălan (1959–2015), Romanian football player and coach
- Nicolae Bălan (1882–1955), Romanian metropolitan bishop
- Petru Bălan (born 1976), Romanian rugby player
- Tiberiu Bălan (born 1981), Romanian football player

== See also ==
- Ballan (surname)
- Balun (disambiguation)
