= Panatta =

Panatta is an Italian surname. Notable people with the surname include:

- Adriano Panatta (born 1950), Italian tennis player
- Claudio Panatta (born 1960), Italian tennis player, brother of Adriano

== See also ==
- Panetta
