= Villers-Cernay =

- Part of Bazeilles
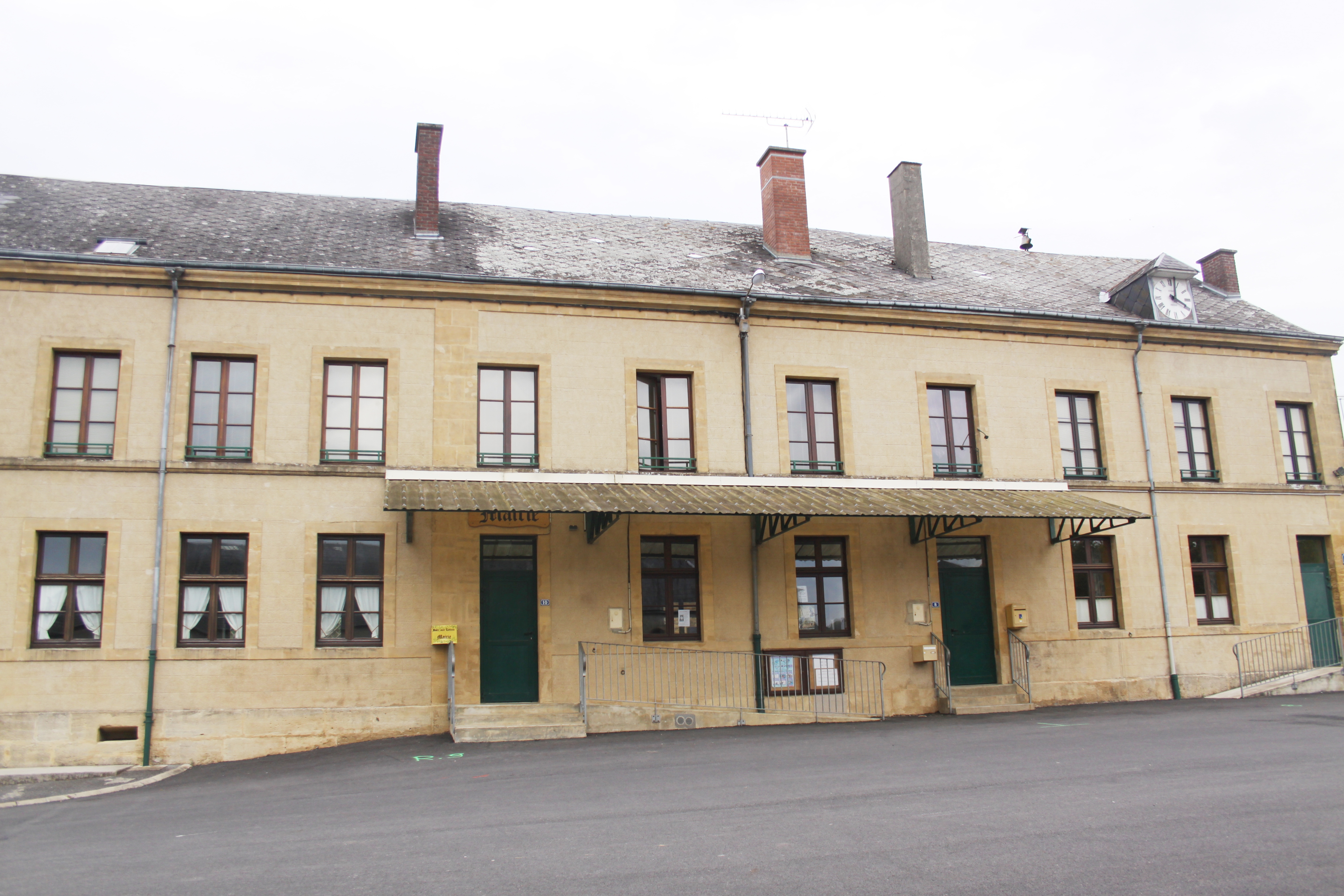
- Town hall

- Coat of arms
- Location of Villers-Cernay
- Location within France Location within Grand Est
- Coordinates: 49°43′05″N 5°01′56″E
- Country: France
- Region: Grand Est
- Department: Ardennes
- Arrondissement: Sedan
- Canton: Sedan-3
- Commune: Bazeilles
- Area^{1}: 22.15 km^{2} (8.55 sq mi)
- Elevation: 240 m (790 ft)
- Population (2023): 339
  - Density: 15.3/km^{2} (39.6/sq mi)
- Time zone: UTC+01:00 (CET)
  - Summer (DST): UTC+02:00 (CEST)
- Postal code: 08140
- ^{1} French Land Register data, which excludes lakes, ponds, glaciers > 1 km^{2} (0.386 sq mi or 247 acres) and river estuaries.

Villers-Cernay (French pronunciation: [vilɛʁ sɛʁnɛ]) is a former commune in the Ardennes department in northern France. On 1 January 2017, it was merged into the commune Bazeilles.

== See also ==
- Communes of the Ardennes department
