= La Moncelle =

- Part of Bazeilles
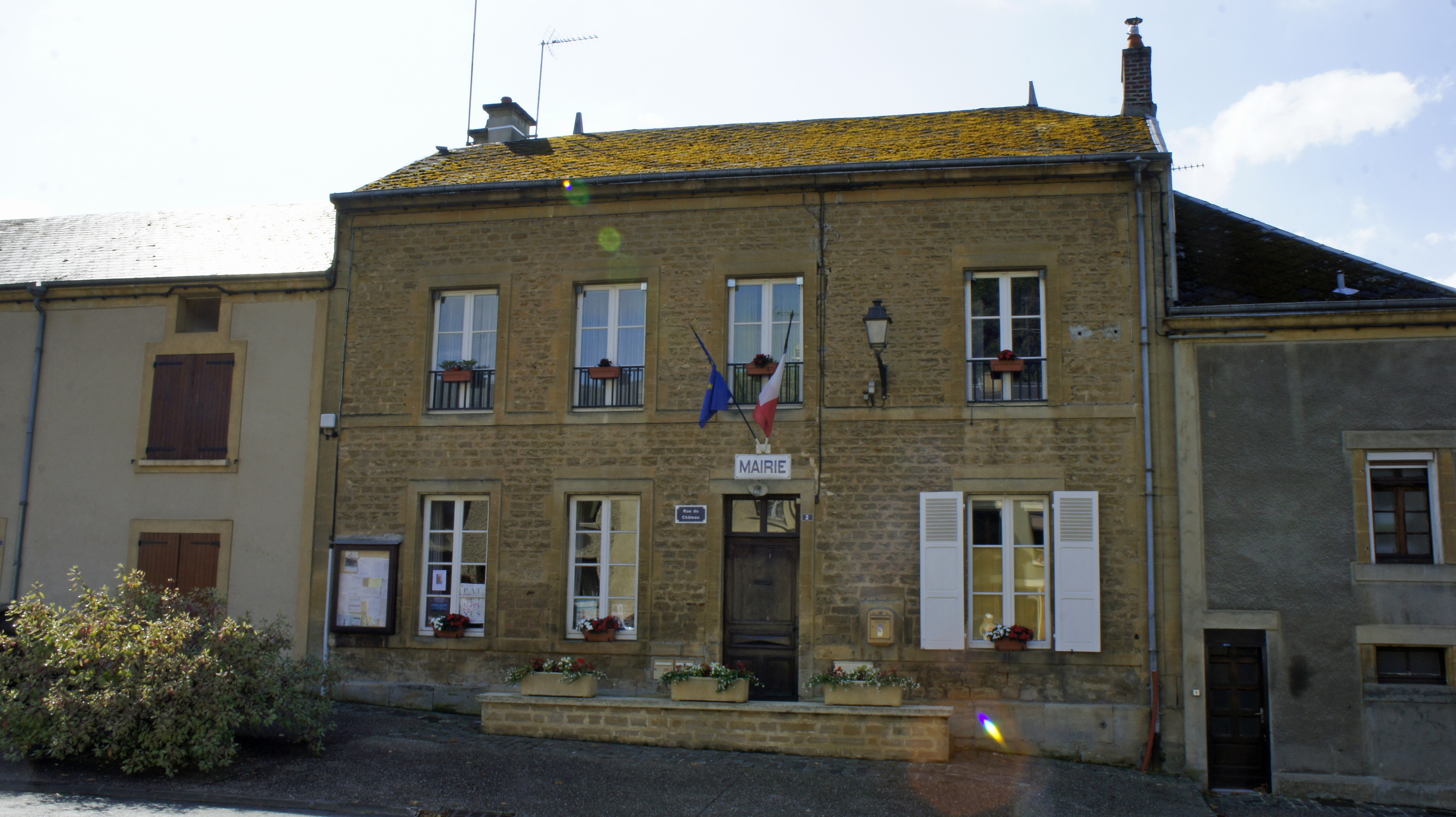
- Town hall

- Coat of arms
- Location of La Moncelle
- Location within France Location within Grand Est
- Coordinates: 49°41′23″N 4°59′25″E
- Country: France
- Region: Grand Est
- Department: Ardennes
- Arrondissement: Sedan
- Canton: Sedan-3
- Commune: Bazeilles
- Area^{1}: 1.35 km^{2} (0.52 sq mi)
- Elevation: 180 m (590 ft)
- Population (2021): 137
  - Density: 101/km^{2} (263/sq mi)
- Time zone: UTC+01:00 (CET)
  - Summer (DST): UTC+02:00 (CEST)
- Postal code: 08140
- ^{1} French Land Register data, which excludes lakes, ponds, glaciers > 1 km^{2} (0.386 sq mi or 247 acres) and river estuaries.

La Moncelle (French pronunciation: [la mɔ̃sɛl]) is a former commune in the Ardennes department in northern France. On 1 January 2024, it was merged into the commune of Bazeilles.

== Population ==
Historical population
Year	Pop.	±% p.a.
1968	151	—
1975	138	−1.28%
1982	119	−2.09%
1990	130	+1.11%
1999	127	−0.26%
2009	134	+0.54%
2014	137	+0.44%
2020	132	−0.62%
Source: INSEE

== See also ==
- Communes of the Ardennes department
