= Bazeilles =

- Commune
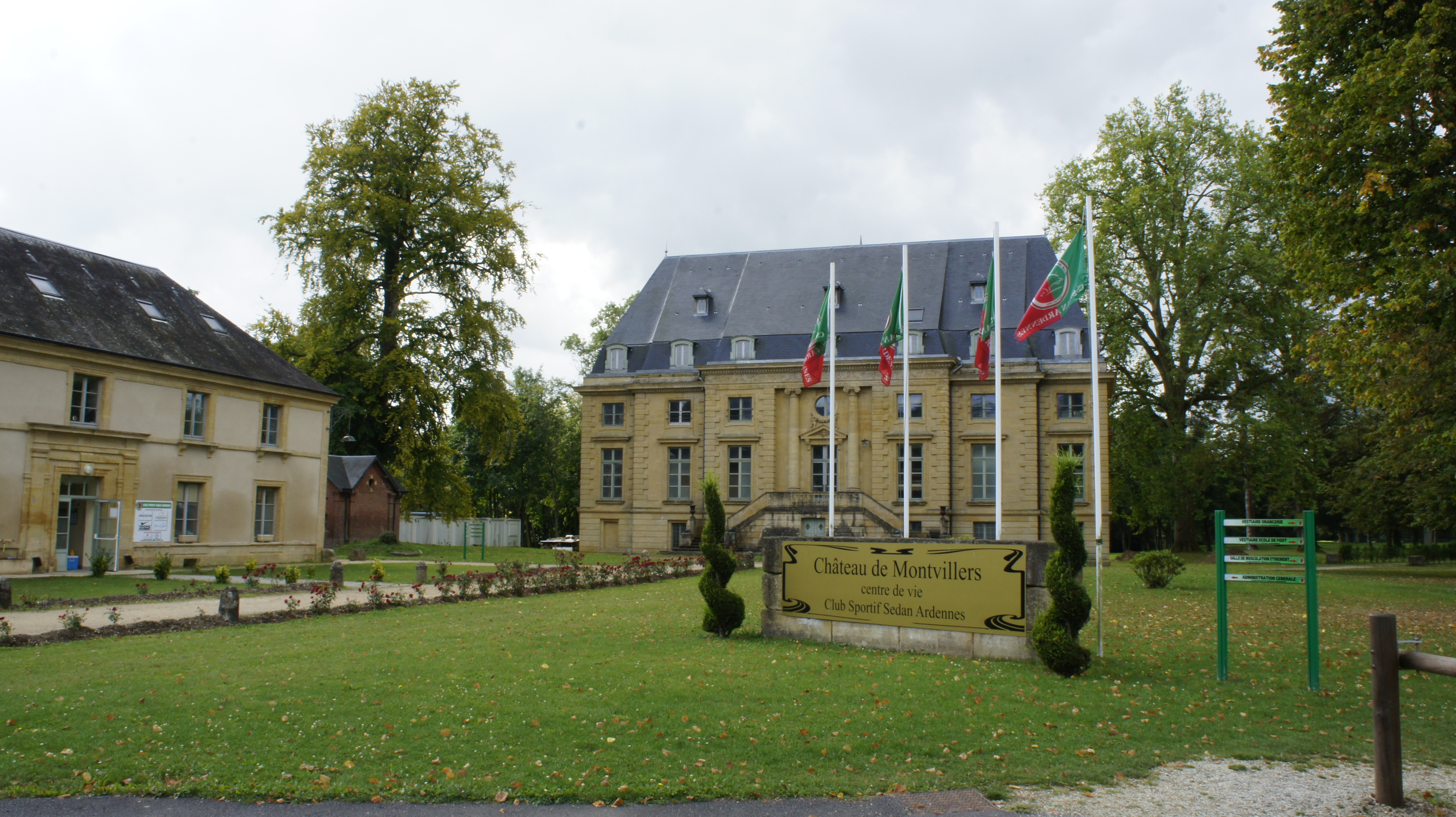
- The CSSA Club Sportif Sedan Ardennes in Bazeilles

- Coat of arms
- Location of Bazeilles
- Location within France Location within Grand Est
- Coordinates: 49°40′41″N 4°58′38″E
- Country: France
- Region: Grand Est
- Department: Ardennes
- Arrondissement: Sedan
- Canton: Sedan-3
- Intercommunality: CA Ardenne Métropole

Government
  - Mayor (2020–2026): Francis Bonne
- Area^{1}: 37.44 km^{2} (14.46 sq mi)
- Elevation: 156 m (512 ft)
- Highest elevation: 238 m (781 ft)
- Lowest elevation: 152 m (499 ft)
- Population (2023): 2,470
  - Density: 66.0/km^{2} (171/sq mi)
- Time zone: UTC+01:00 (CET)
  - Summer (DST): UTC+02:00 (CEST)
- INSEE/Postal code: 08053 /08140
- ^{1} French Land Register data, which excludes lakes, ponds, glaciers > 1 km^{2} (0.386 sq mi or 247 acres) and river estuaries.

Bazeilles (French pronunciation: [bazɛj]) is a commune in the Ardennes department in the Grand Est region of northern France. On 1 January 2017, the former communes of Rubécourt-et-Lamécourt and Villers-Cernay were merged into Bazeilles. On 1 January 2024, the former commune of La Moncelle was merged into Bazeilles.

The inhabitants of the commune are known as Bazeillais or Bazeillaises.

The commune has been awarded three flowers by the National Council of Towns and Villages in Bloom in the Competition of cities and villages in Bloom.

== Geography ==
Bazeilles is located some 4 km south-east of Sedan and 2 km west of Douzy. Access to the commune is by Route nationale 43 (N43) from Sedan in the west which passes through the north of the commune and changes to the D8043 before continuing east to Douzy. Exit 3 Balan lies within the commune which leads to the D764 that goes south to the village. The N43 also links with the beginning of the N58 in the commune which goes north. Other access roads include the D8043A from Balan in the north-west which goes to the village then continues east to join the D8043. The D129 comes from Daigny in the north and passes through the village before continuing south to Remilly-Aillicourt. The D17 from Balan passes through the commune just north of the village and continues east. A railway passes through the south of the commune from east to south-west with no station in the commune. The next station to the east is at Carignan and the next to the west is at Sedan. The commune has a significant sized urban are and a large industrial estate with a very large Unilin plant. The rest of the commune is farmland.

The Meuse river forms the south-western border of the commune as it flows north-west to eventually join the Hollands Diep at Lage Zwaluwe (Netherlands). The Chiers river flows from the north-east forming part of the south-eastern border before joining the Meuse in the south-eastern corner of the commune. The Ruisseau de la Givinne flows from the north through the centre of the commune before joining the Meuse in the south.

== Toponymy ==
The name Bazeilles would have appeared in the 6th or 7th century and comes from a variation of the Latin word Basilicatum meaning "church".

Bazeilles appears as Bazeille on the 1750 Cassini Map and the same on the 1790 version.

== History ==
=== Middle Ages ===
In the 13th century Bazeilles was a small lordship dependent on the Abbey of Mouzon and the Reims Cathedral before being united with the lordship of Sedan-Balan under the yoke of Gilles II of Hierges. The new lordship of Sedan-Balan-Bazeilles become the "starting point" of the future Principality of Sedan.

It was possible that a small castle guarded the road to Douzy and Yvois (Carignan) and would have been in the northern part of the park of the current Chateau of Orival along the Givonne (rue du General Lebrun).

From 1560 to 1642 Bazeilles was part of the Principality of Sedan.

=== Franco-Prussian War ===
Related article: Battle of Sedan.

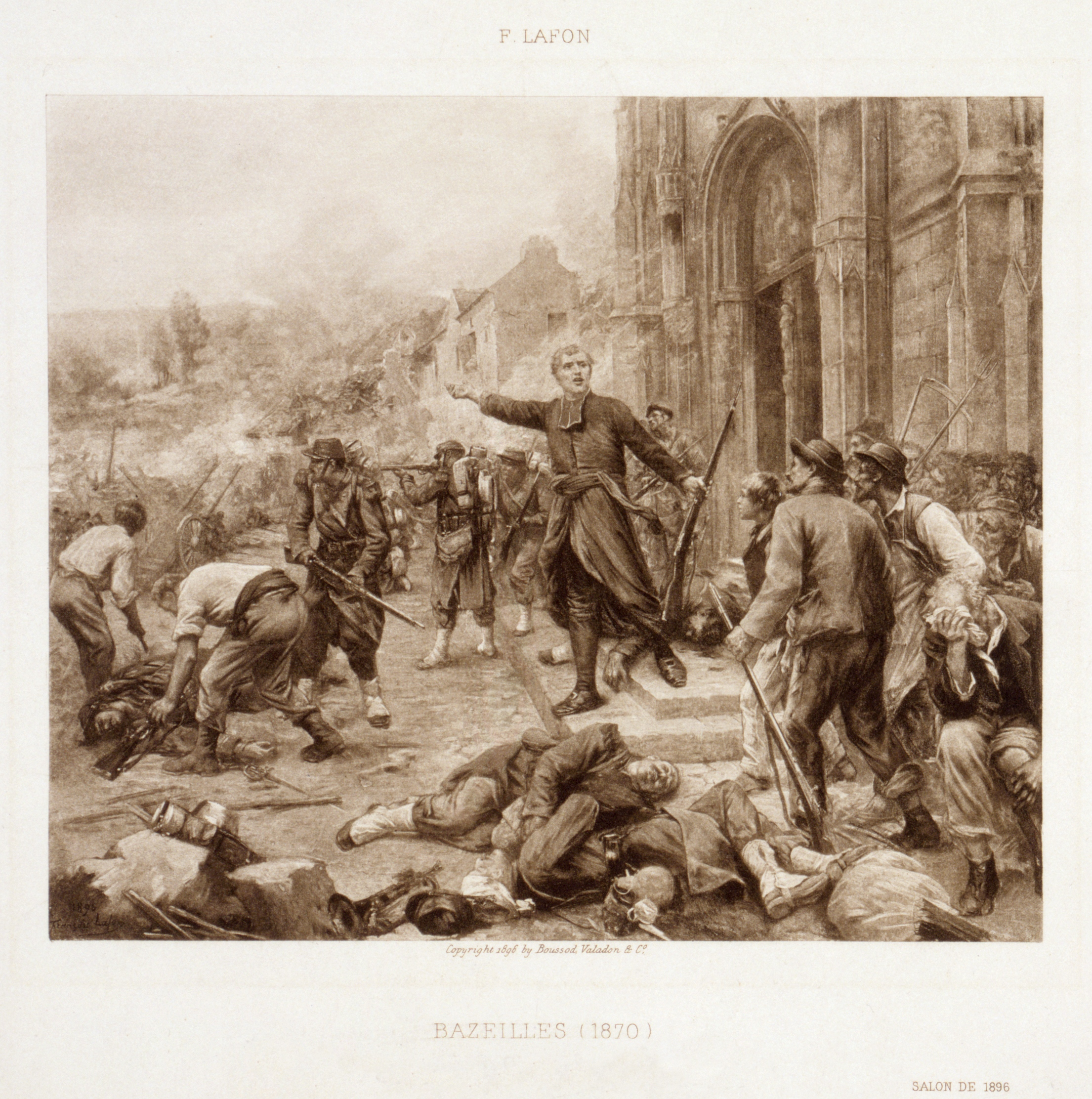
Photogravure of Bazeilles (1870) by François Lafon

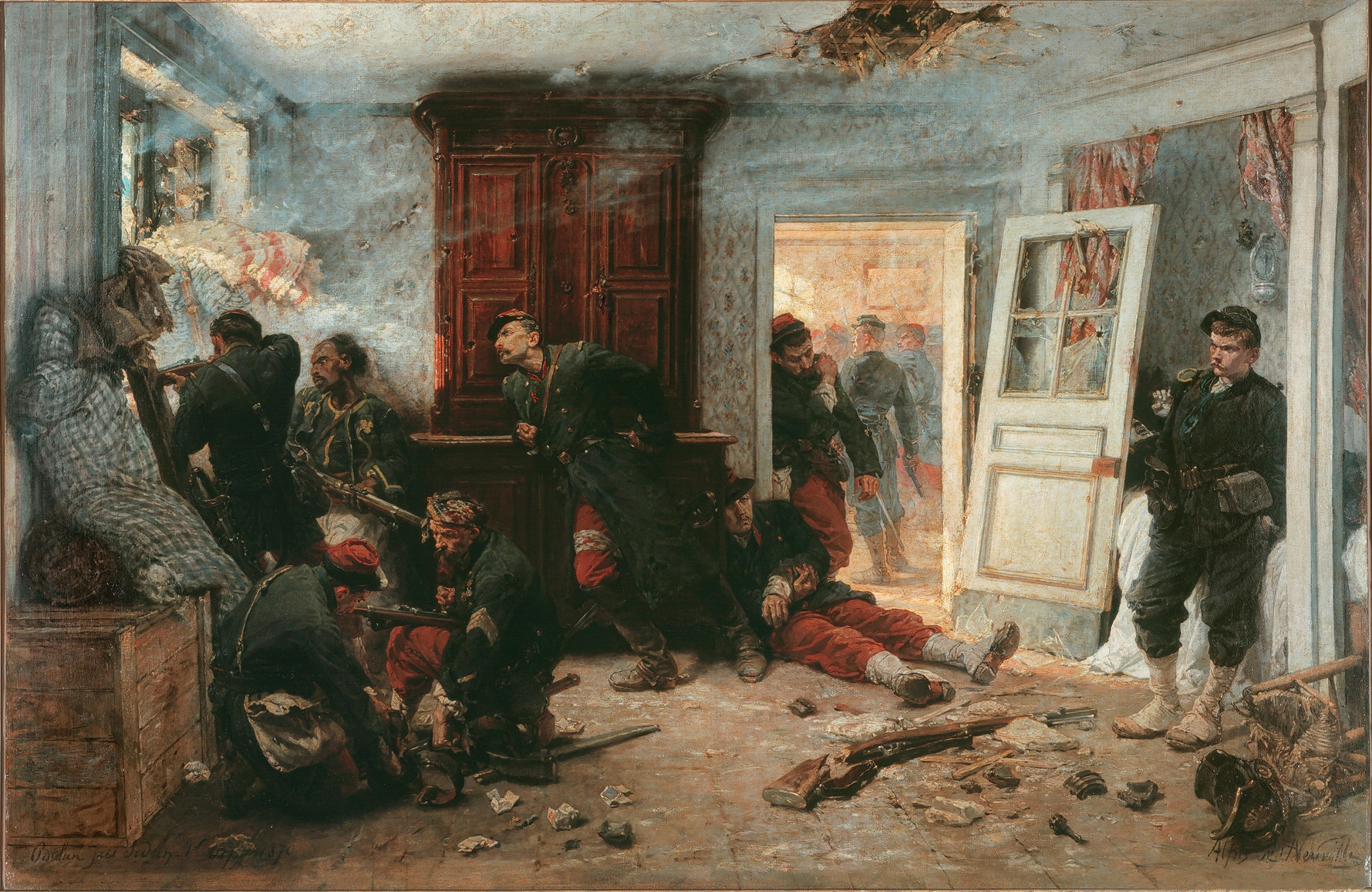
Painting by Alphonse-Marie-Adolphe de Neuville, The Last Cartridges.

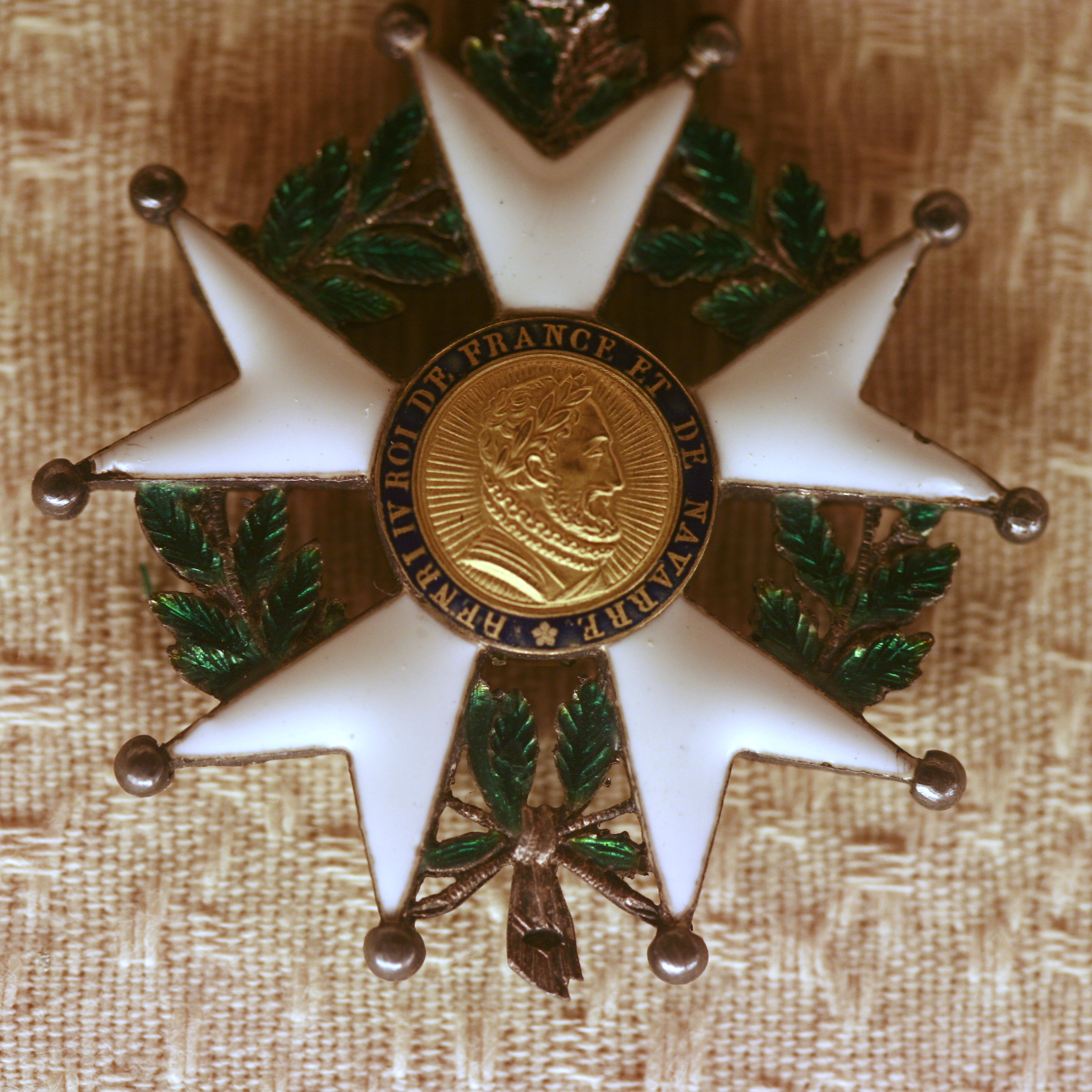
Legion of Honour

During the Battle of Bazeilles on 1 September 1870 the commune was the scene of intense fighting between units of French marines and Bavarian regiments. Under the command of Commander Lambert and Captains Aubert, Bourgey, Delaury, Picard and the Blue Division, in the Bourgerie Inn, a few hundred men and officers resisted until their ammunition was completely exhausted. This moment of history was illustrated by the famous painting by Alphonse-Marie-Adolphe de Neuville painted in 1873: The last cartridges and conserved in Bazeilles in the House of the last cartridge.

During the battle, French civilians actively participated by firing on Bavarian troops and tending to the wounded. Angered by the casualties the civilians inflicted, the Bavarian soldiers killed many of them, setting fire to houses from which the shots were fired. By midday, the whole village was on fire. Captured Franc-tireur partisans, along with other civilians who were considered unlawful combatants, were later executed. Although French propaganda showed massacres of men, women and children, an official French investigation found that only 39 civilians from Bazeilles died. An additional 150 people (10% of the village population) died from injuries in the subsequent months.

Bazeilles was awarded the Legion of Honour on 9 October 1900. Bazeilles is one of the communes where is the action of the novel "La débâcle" by Emile Zola is set.

=== Second World War ===
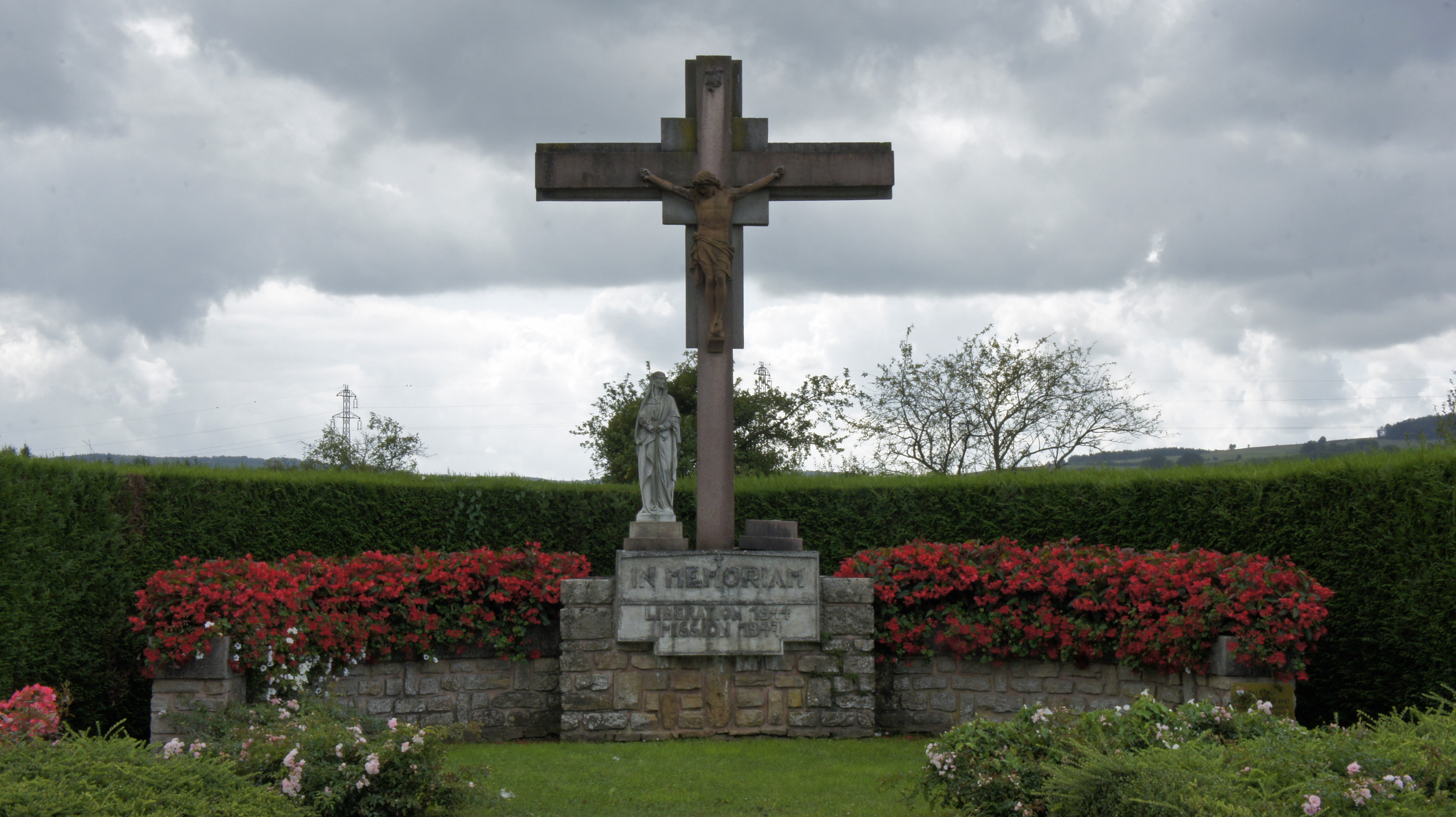
The War Memorial

During the Second World War and during the Phoney War, the command post of the 5th Light Cavalry Division under General Jacques-Marie Chanoine was established in Bazeilles. Then the Battle of France was triggered on 10 May 1940 and the Cavalry Division left for Belgium. A few days later Bazeilles was taken by the 10th Panzer Division under Ferdinand Schaal. Bazeilles was the initial base for the Schützen-Regiment 69 (Infantry from the 10th Panzer-Division), who, on the afternoon of 13 May 1940, launched an attack to cross the Meuse. The attempt was thwarted by the French artillery. At the same time an attempt by the Schützen-Regiment 86 (the other infantry regiment of the 10th Panzer Division) in front of Wadelincourt succeeded and the Schützen-Regiment 69 then swerved then to that sector.

=== Heraldry ===
Arms of Bazeilles	Blazon: Party per fess, at 1 party per pale Or, with 3 points of flame Gules and Azure, an anchor of Or; at 2 Gules, a Legion of Honour proper.

== Administration ==
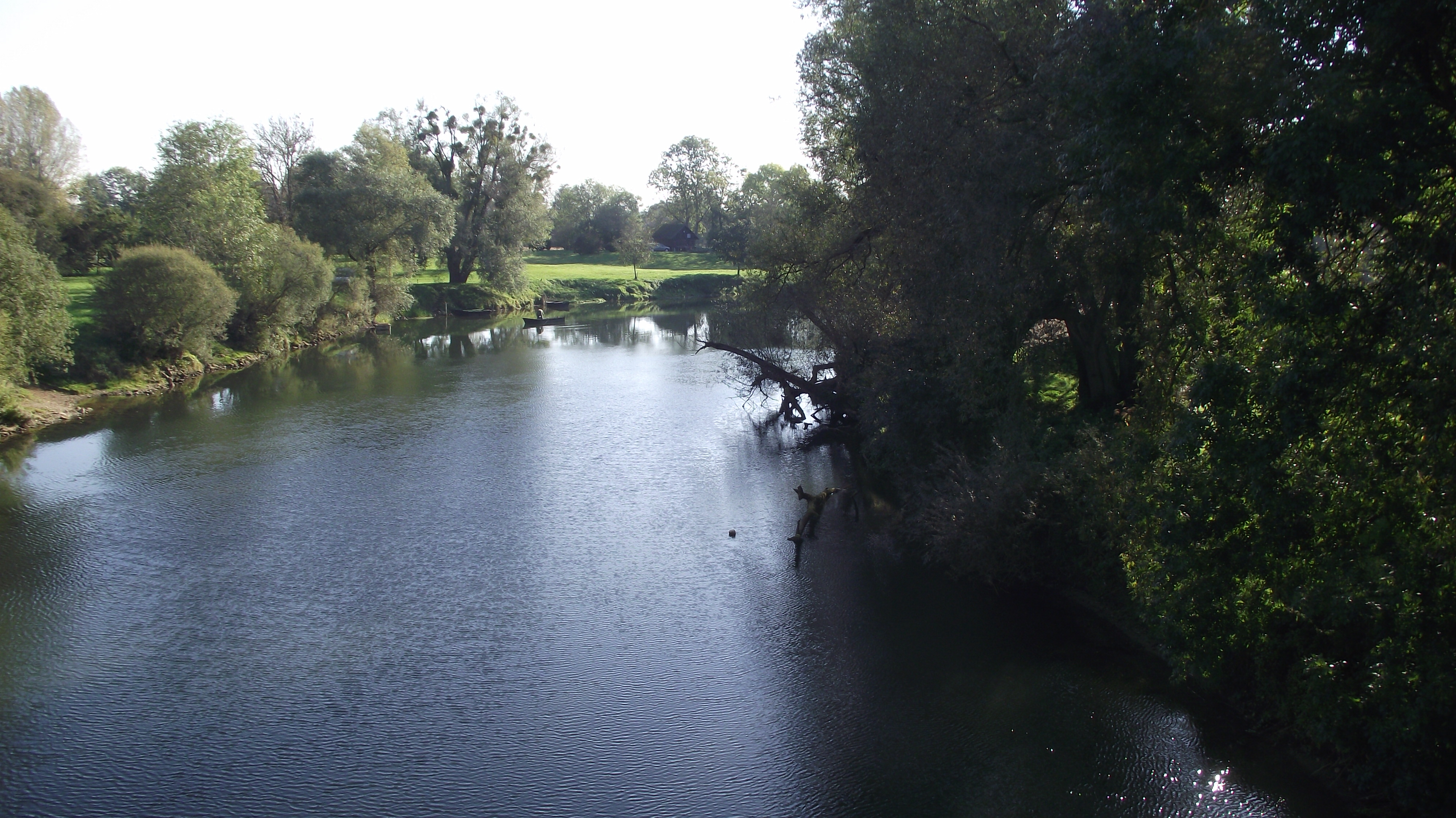
The Meuse at Bazeilles

List of Successive Mayors

From	To	Name	Party	Position
1912	1945	Alexandre Abd-El-Nour	Independent Radicals	Doctor
1973	1989	André Etchegoimberry		Butcher
1995	2014	Pierre Sulfourt		General Councillor (1992–2004)
2014	2020	Guy Lepage		
2020	2026	Francis Bonne		

== Demography ==
The population data in the table below refer to the commune of Bazeilles proper, in its geography at the given years.

Historical population

Year	Pop.	±% p.a.
1793	1,062	—
1800	884	−2.59%
1806	1,081	+3.41%
1821	1,300	+1.24%
1831	1,380	+0.60%
1836	1,386	+0.09%
1841	1,691	+4.06%
1846	1,837	+1.67%
1851	1,951	+1.21%
1866	2,048	+0.32%
1872	1,470	−5.38%
1876	1,768	+4.72%
1881	1,862	+1.04%
1886	1,734	−1.41%
1891	1,525	−2.54%
1896	1,413	−1.51%
1901	1,406	−0.10%
1906	1,352	−0.78%

Year	Pop.	±% p.a.
1911	1,258	−1.43%
1921	1,127	−1.09%
1926	1,171	+0.77%
1931	1,164	−0.12%
1936	1,268	+1.73%
1946	1,176	−0.75%
1954	1,344	+1.68%
1962	1,356	+0.11%
1968	1,337	−0.23%
1975	1,376	+0.41%
1982	1,708	+3.14%
1990	1,599	−0.82%
1999	1,879	+1.81%
2007	1,976	+0.63%
2012	2,022	+0.46%
2017	2,394	+3.44%
2023	2,470	+0.52%

Source: EHESS and INSEE

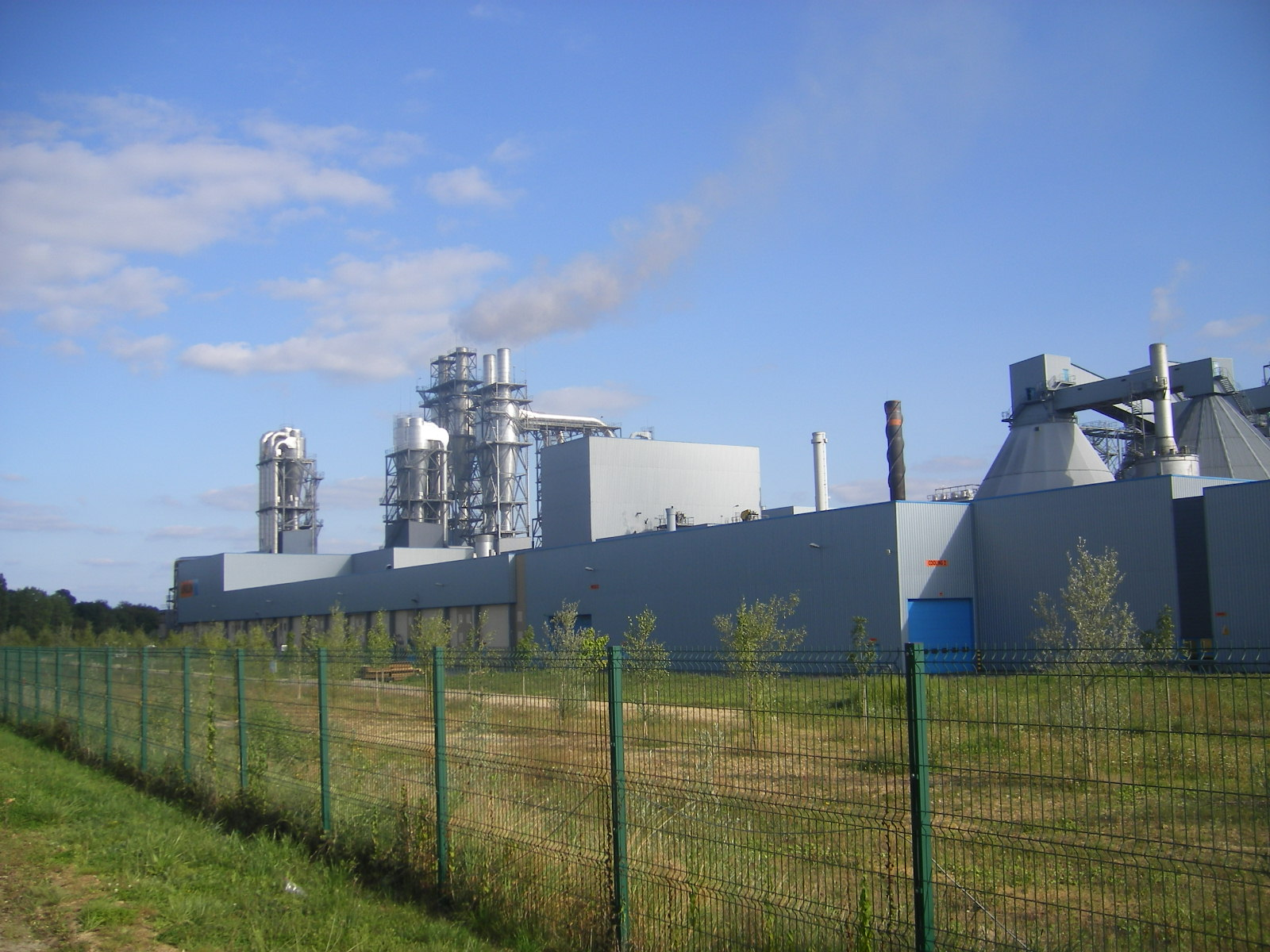
Bazeilles Industrial zone

== Culture and heritage ==
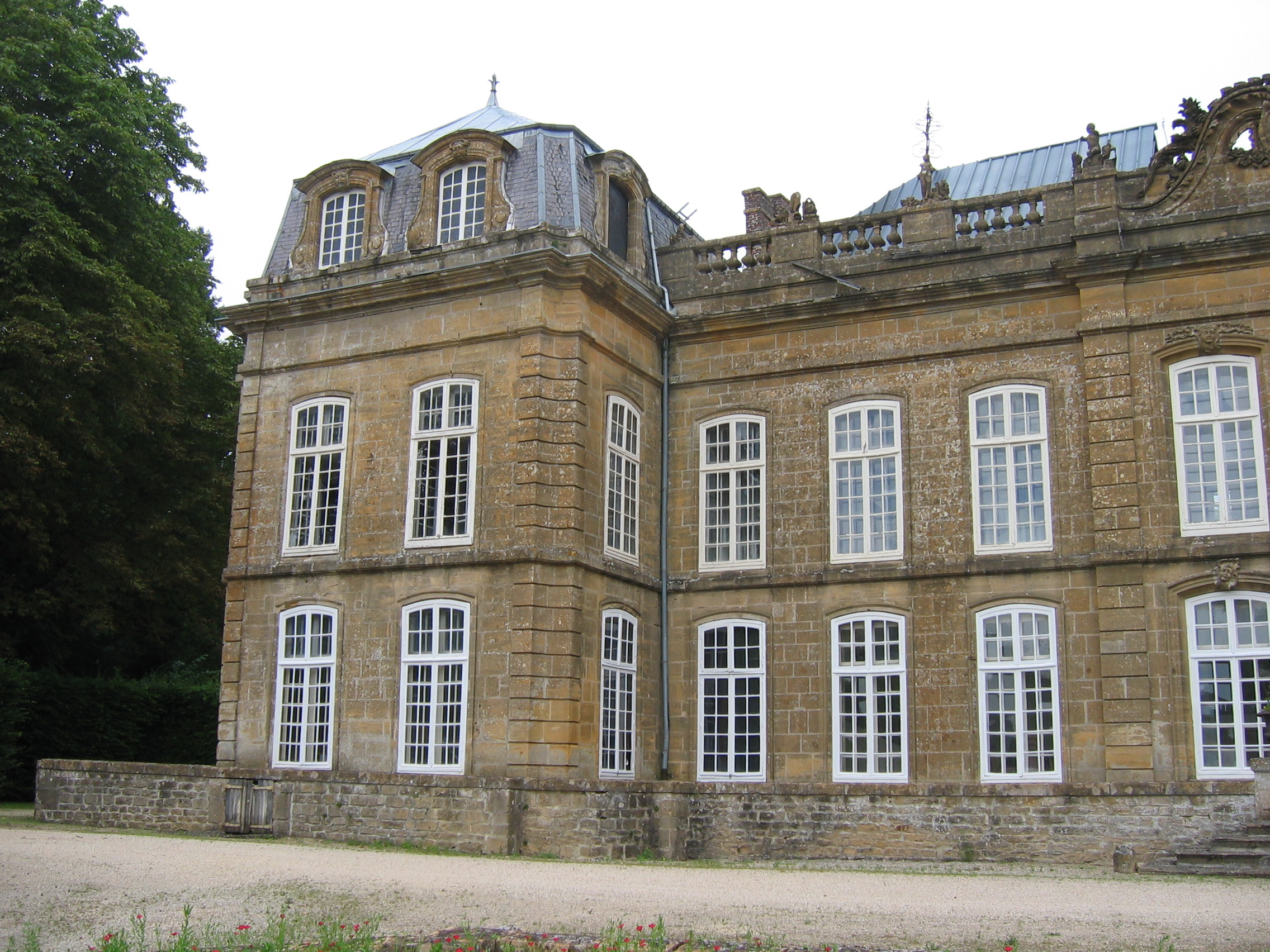
The Chateau of Orival

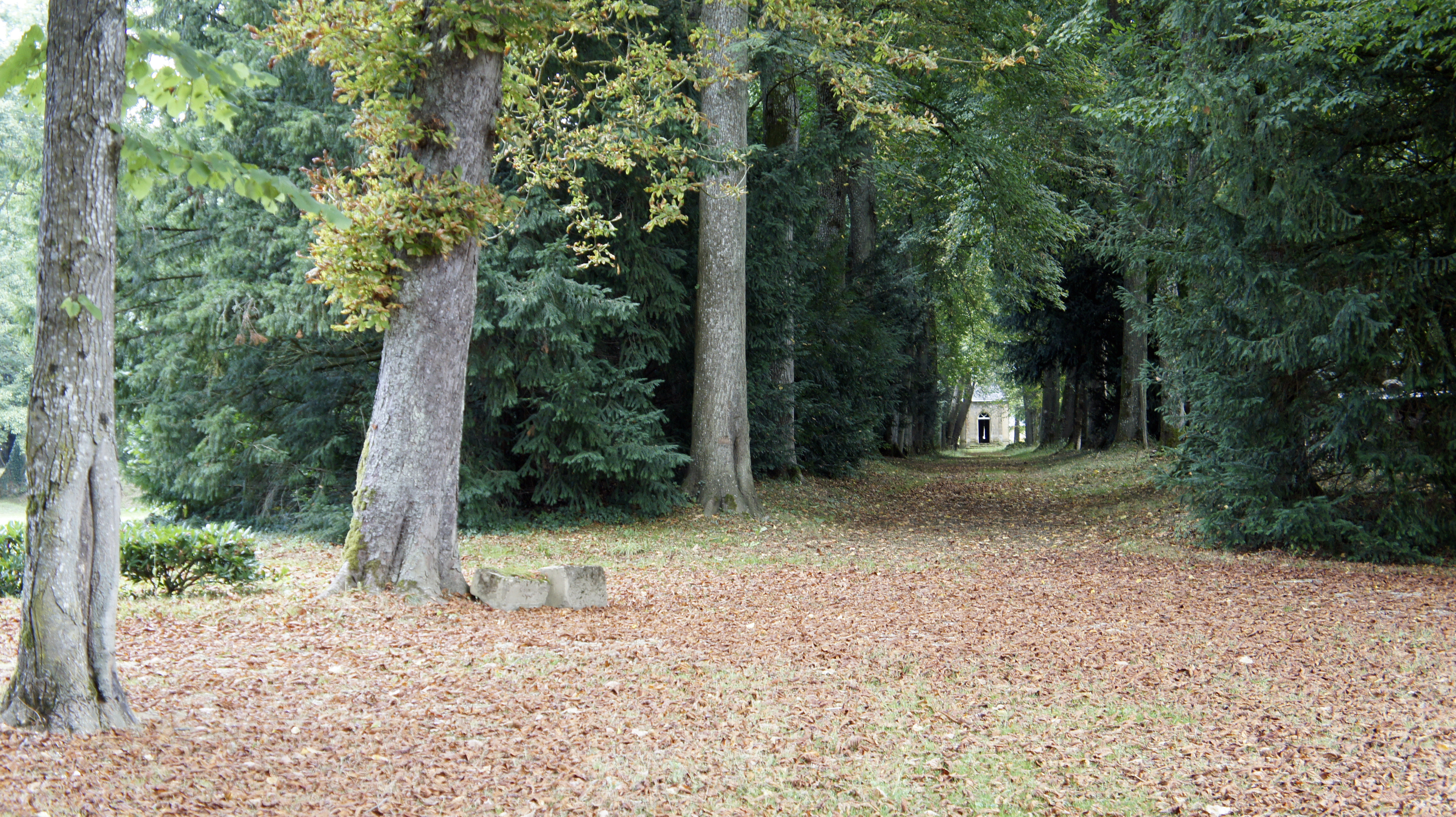
The Chateau of Orival Park

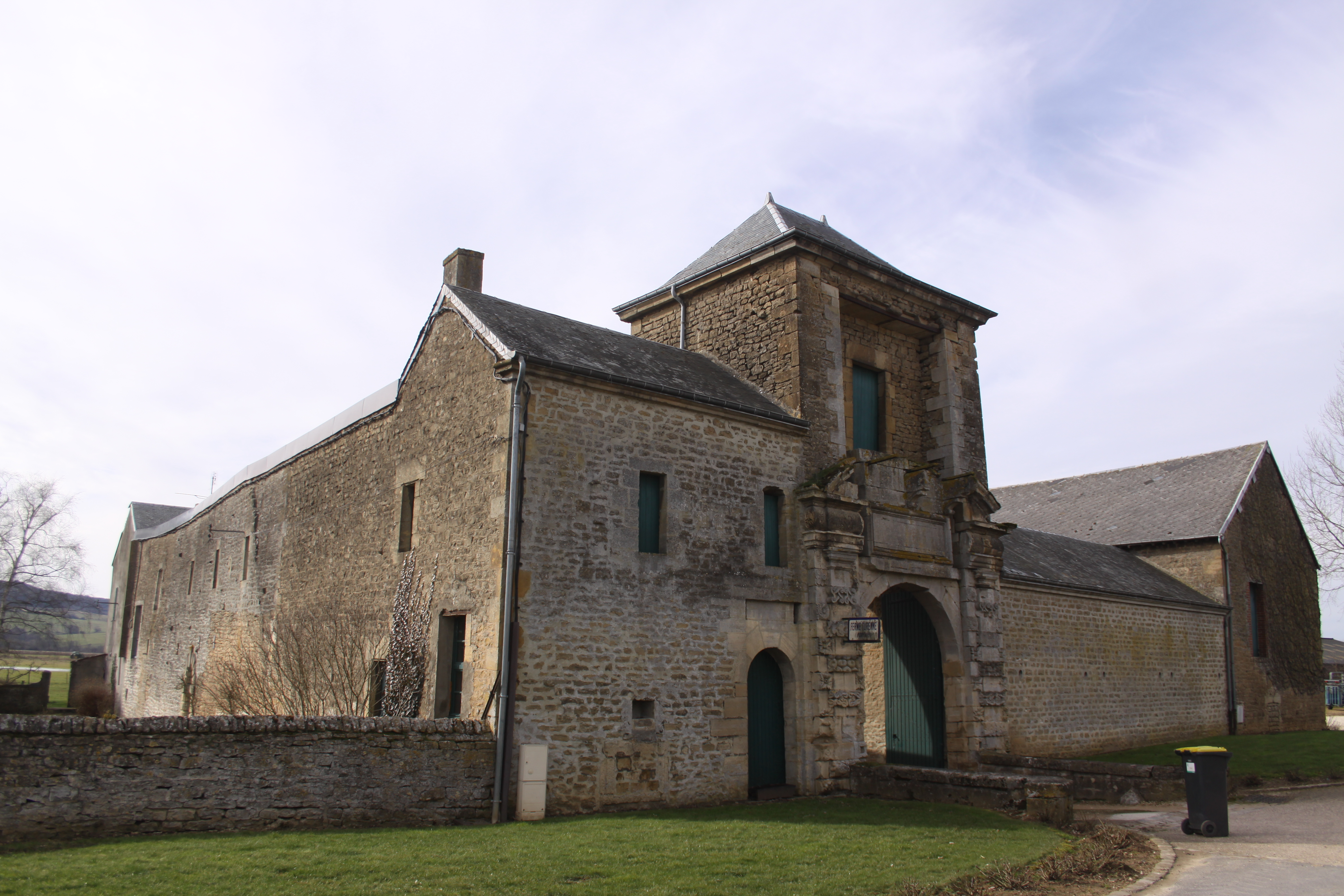
The Chateau of Turrenne (now a farmhouse)

=== Civil heritage ===
- The Home of the last cartridge (museum), the scene of fighting, during the Franco-Prussian War of 1870, held by the Blue Division. This place has become a memorial site and museum of French Marine Troops.
- The French and Prussian Ossuary monument in the communal cemetery.
- The Chateau of Orival: built in 1750 for Louis Labauche, a draper from Sedan, sometimes attributed to the architect Emmanuel Héré de Corny and Jean Lamour for the ironwork. These attributions are not reinforced by any concrete evidence and, according to Jean-Lucien Guenoun, "the rusticity of the treatment of carved windows suggests less illustrious artisans" The chateau was the summer residence of Louis Labauche.

The commune has a number of buildings and sites that are registered as historical monuments:

- A Pasta Factory (1911)
- The Chateau of Turrenne (16th century). Only the portal remains of the old building. Now a farmhouse.
- A Chateau (18th century)
- The Chateau of Orival Park
- The Chateau of Montvillers (1770) built for John Abraham Poupart de Neuflize, a draper from Sedan, by the King's architect Claude Jean-Baptiste Jallier de Savault. Now the training centre of the CSSA Club Sportif Sedan Ardennes.

== Notable people linked to the commune ==
- Alexandre Abd-El-Nour (1869–1956) : Doctor, Mayor of Bazeilles, first president of the Automobile Club Ardennais and first president of the Aero Club of Ardennes.
- Erik Haldorf, painter, born in 1937 in Bazeilles.

== See also ==
- Communes of the Ardennes department

=== Bibliography ===
- Jacques Rousseau: Bazeilles, origins and mutations, 2002. ISBN 2-84458-008-4.
