= Bala (name) =

Bala is a given name and surname. People with that name include:

== Given name ==
- Bala Achi (1956–2005), Niɡerian historian, writer, and academician
- Bala Ade Dauke (died 2005), Nigerian leader
- Bala Ali (1968–after 1990), footballer
- Bala Bachchan (born 1966), Indian politician
- Bala Bhegade (born 1976), Indian politician
- Bala Bredin (1916–2005), British Army officer
- Bala Dahir (born 1995), Nigerian footballer
- Bala Devi Chandrashekar, Bharatanatyam dancer and teacher
- Bala Ganapathi William (born 1990), Malaysian actor and director known professionally as BGW
- Bala Garba (born 1974), Nigerian footballer and coach
- Bala Garba Jahumpa (born 1958), Gambian politician and diplomat
- Bala Hijam (born 1992), Indian actress
- Bala Jones (fl. 1901), Wales rugby player
- Bala (actor), South Indian film actor
- Bala Mohammed (born 1958), Nigerian senator
- Bala Murali (born 1969), Indian cricket umpire
- Bala S. Manian (born 1944), Indian-born Silicon Valley entrepreneur
- Bala Sawant (died 2015), Indian politician from Maharashtra
- Bala Tampoe (1922–2014), Sri Lankan lawyer and a trade unionist
- Balavarman (r. 398–422), ruler of Kamarupa
- Rabia Bala Hatun (died 1324), Anatolian princess and consort of Ottoman Sultan Osman

== Surname ==
- Abdullahi Bala (born 1967), Nigerian academic, author, and professor of soil science
- Ajayan Bala, Indian writer, film director, and screenplay writer
- Aliko Bala (born 1997), Nigerian Footballer
- Anju Bala (born 1979), Indian politician
- Bala Anandan, an Indian politician
- Bhai Bala (1466–1544), Saint of the Sikh Religion
- Carlos Balá (1925–2022), Argentine actor and comedian
- Chris Bala (born 1978), American Ice-Hockey Player
- Danillo Bala (born 1993), Brazilian Footballer
- Fábio Bala (born 1981), Brazilian Footballer
- Giacomo Balla (1871-1958) Italian Futurist painter
- Iwan Bala (born 1956), Welsh Artist
- Krystian Bala (born 1973), Polish writer, photographer and convicted murderer
- Kujtim Bala (born 1990), Kosovar Football Player, playing for Halmstads BK
- Manju Bala (born 1989), Indian Track and Field Athlete
- Parveen Bala, Fijian Politician
- Roland Bala (born 1990), Papua New Guinean footballer

== Nickname ==
- Alwar Balasubramaniam (born 1971), Indian sculptor, painter, printmaker, and installation artist

== See also ==
- Bala (disambiguation)
