= Luis Queirolo Repetto =

Uruguayan painter (1862–1947)

- Born: 1862; Montevideo, Uruguay
- Died: 1947 (aged 84–85)
- Known for: Painting
- Notable work: "Artigas en 1815", "Lectura interesante", "Partida de Ajedrez", "Lago del Prado", "Viejo durmiendo"
- Awards: gold medal at the Ibero-American Exhibition in Seville (1930)

Luis Queirolo Repetto (1862 – December 8, 1947) was a notable Uruguayan painter, recognized primarily for his portrait work.

== Biography ==
Born in Montevideo, he moved to Genoa as a child, where he began his artistic education. He studied at the prestigious Ligustica Academy under the Venetian painter Pietro Paietta, further honing his skills in Florence's artistic circles. During this period, he produced several of his well-known early works, such as "Lectura interesante" and "Partida de Ajedrez".

In 1897, Queirolo Repetto returned to Montevideo, where he pursued a dual career in painting and teaching, particularly in secondary schools. His work was featured in major exhibitions, including the 1930 Ibero-American Exposition in Seville, where he earned a gold medal.

His work was also featured in numerous national exhibitions, including the Exposición de Pintores Uruguayos (1908), Exposición Nacional de Artistas Libres (1926), and the Exposición del Centenario de la Independencia (1930). His painting "Lago del Prado" earned him recognition in 1940, and his piece "Viejo durmiendo" was chosen by popular vote at the Salón Municipal that same year.

== Works ==
Queirolo Repetto painted over fifty portraits of prominent figures, including Joaquín Suárez and José Batlle y Ordóñez. His historical painting "Artigas en 1815" became iconic. His works can be found in museums such as the National Museum of Visual Arts (Uruguay) and Juan Manuel Blanes Museum.
