= Balan =

Balan may refer to:

== Places ==
- Bălan, a town in Harghita County, Romania
- Bălan, Sălaj, a commune in Sălaj County, Romania
- Bălan (river), a tributary of the Râmnicul Sărat in Vrancea County, Romania
- Balan, Ain, a French commune
- Balan, Ardennes, a French commune
- Balan, Iran (disambiguation), places in Iran

== People ==
- Balan (surname)
- Balan K. Nair (1933–2000), Indian actor
- Sir Balan, the brother of Sir Balin in Arthurian legend
- King Balan of al-Andalus (Moorish Spain), father of Fierabras in the chansons de geste
- Dan Balan, singer and songwriter

== Other uses ==
- Balam (demon), sometimes spelled "Balan"
- Balan: Book of Angels Volume 5, a 2006 album by the Cracow Klezmer Band composed by John Zorn
- Balan (film), the first Indian talkie film in Malayalam cinema
- Balan Wonderworld, a 2021 video game
- Balan: The Boy, 2026 Malayalam movie

== See also ==
- Bala (disambiguation)
- Bal (disambiguation)
