= Bal =

Bal or BAL may refer to:

== People ==
- Bal (surname), including a list of people with the name
- Bal (given name), including a list of people with the name

== Places ==
- Bal, Iran (disambiguation), several places
- Bal, Zira, Punjab, India
- Bäl, Gotland, Sweden
- Baltic States, UNDP country code BAL

== Science ==
=== Medicine ===
- Bio-artificial liver, a bioartificial liver device
- Blood alcohol content
- Bronchoalveolar lavage, a diagnostic method of the lower respiratory system
- British anti-Lewisite, or Dimercaprol, a medication to treat acute poisoning
- Cholate—CoA ligase, or bile acid CoA ligase (BAL), an enzyme

=== Computing ===
- IBM Basic Assembly Language and successors
- Business application language

== Sports ==
- Basketball Africa League
- BAL (basketball club), a Dutch professional basketball team from the city of Limburg

== Transportation ==
- Balham station, London, England, station code BAL
- Ballarat railway station, Australia
- Baltimore Penn Station, Baltimore, Maryland, US, AMTRAK code BAL
- Batman Airport, Batman, Turkey, IATA airport code BAL
- BAL, abbreviation of the now-defunct Russian airline, BAL Bashkirian Airlines
- BAL, abbreviation of the former flag carrier of North Bornean airline, Borneo Airways Limited
- BAL, the previous IATA code for Baltimore-Washington International Airport, then known as Friendship Airport.

== Other uses ==
- Bal (film), or Honey, a 2010 Turkish film
- 8678 Bäl, a main belt asteroid
- Bal, a ground-launched version of the Russian Kh-35 anti-ship missile
- A Balfolk European folk dance event
- Balboa (dance), or bal
- Balboa High School (California), colloquially known as Bal, in San Francisco, US
- Bornova Anadolu Lisesi, or BAL, a high school in İzmir, Turkey
- Bursa Anadolu Lisesi, or BAL, a high school in Bursa, Turkey
- Balochi language, ISO 639 language code bal

== See also ==
- Bala (disambiguation)
- Balan (disambiguation)
- Bal maiden, a female manual labourer in the mining industries of Cornwall and western Devon, England
- Baltimore, Maryland, US
