= Ballan =

Ballan may refer to:

== Places ==
- Ballan, Victoria, a town in Australia
  - Ballan railway station
- Shire of Ballan, a former local government area in Victoria, Australia
- Ballan, India, a village in Punjab, India

== Other uses ==
- Ballan (surname)
- Ballan (cycling team), a cycling team in 1998

== See also ==
- Ballan wrasse, a fish species
