= Balan, Ardennes =

Balan
- Commune
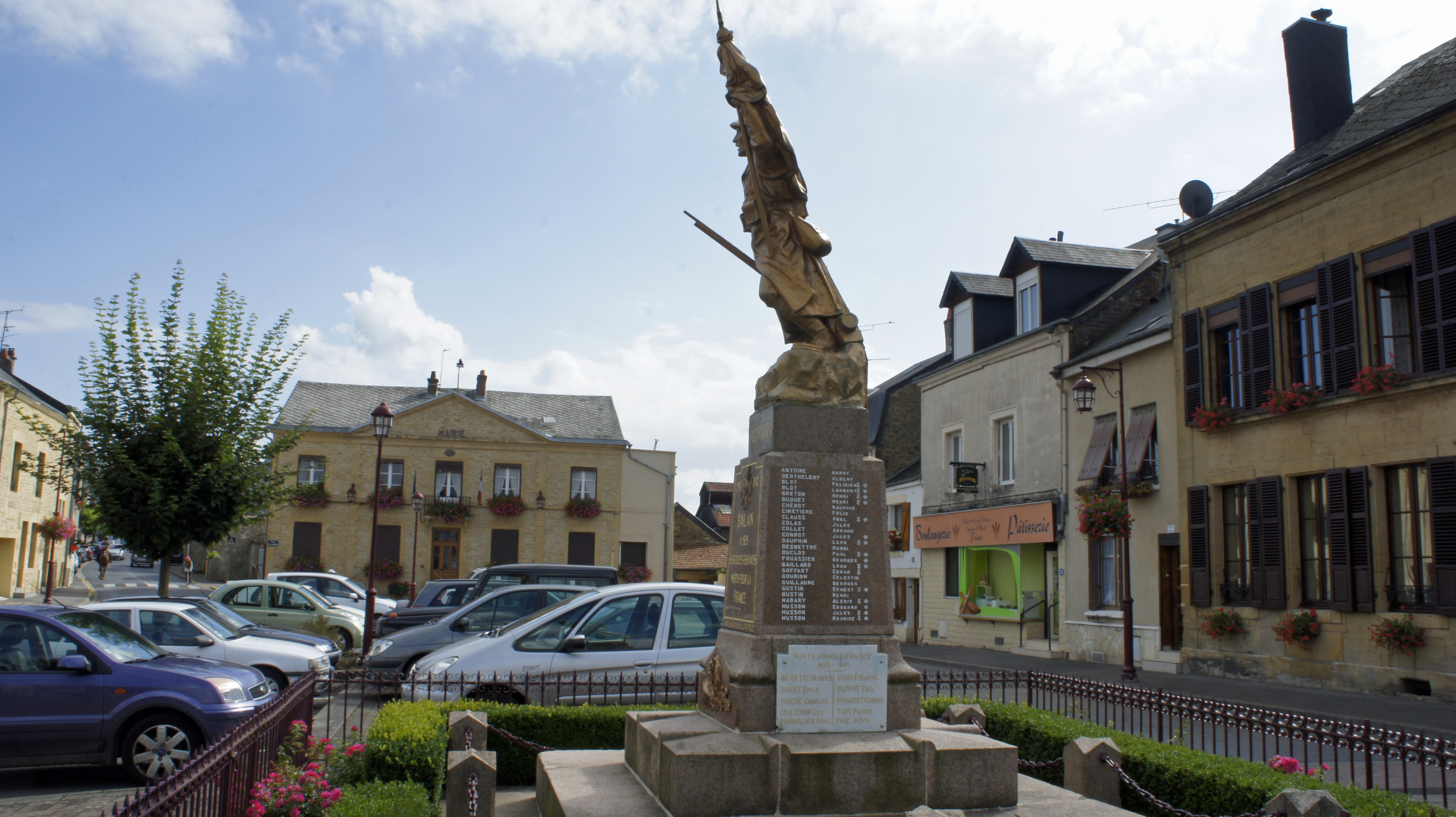
- War memorial and town hall

- Coat of arms
- Location of Balan
- Location within France Location within Grand Est
- Coordinates: 49°41′23″N 4°57′40″E
- Country: France
- Region: Grand Est
- Department: Ardennes
- Arrondissement: Sedan
- Canton: Sedan-3
- Intercommunality: CA Ardenne Métropole

Government
  - Mayor (2020–2026): Alban Collinet
- Area^{1}: 4.65 km^{2} (1.80 sq mi)
- Elevation: 158 m (518 ft)
- Population (2023): 1,579
  - Density: 340/km^{2} (879/sq mi)
- Time zone: UTC+01:00 (CET)
  - Summer (DST): UTC+02:00 (CEST)
- INSEE/Postal code: 08043 /08200
- ^{1} French Land Register data, which excludes lakes, ponds, glaciers > 1 km^{2} (0.386 sq mi or 247 acres) and river estuaries.

Balan (French pronunciation: [balɑ̃]) is a commune in the Ardennes department in the Grand Est region of north-eastern France.

The commune has been awarded three flowers by the National Council of Towns and Villages in Bloom in the Competition of cities and villages in Bloom.

== Geography ==
Balan is located just east of Sedan and north-east of Bazeilles. Access to the commune is by the D8043A road from Sedan which continues south-east to Bazeilles. The D17 also passes through the town and continues east to Rubécourt-et-Lamécourt. The Route nationale N43 (E46) highway passes through the commune with the nearest exit being Exit 3 just south-east of the commune. Much of the central area of the commune is urban with the northern part farmland and some forest.

The Meuse river forms the south-western border of the commune as it flows north through Sedan.

== History ==
From 1560 to 1642 Balan was part of the Principality of Sedan.

=== Heraldry ===
Arms of Balan	Blazon: Party per pale, first Azure a chevron of Or; second Argent, a fess of Gules charged with a mullet of Or between 2 martlets of Sable.

== Administration ==
List of Successive Mayors

Mayors from the 16th century to 1935

From	To	Name
1560	1574	Robert de la Tour
1574		Jean Foulon
1727	1730	Nicolas Gouveno
1730	1738	Noizet
1738	1739	Louis Halma
1739	1757	Jean Halma
1757	1759	Servais Godfroi
1759	1767	Henri Beuvart
1767	1786	Jean-Baptiste Thiéry
1786	1790	Claude Pierret
1790	1802	Gibou Valdory
1802	1812	Jacques Rognon
1812	1816	Branchu
1816	1821	de Bovier
1821	1837	Hourbette Malicet
1837	1848	Renard Maissin
1848	1850	Hourbette
1850	1852	Thiriet
1852	1856	Branchu
1856	1867	Lambert Plaisance
1867	1875	Martin Gourdet
1875	1890	Jean-Baptiste Somveille
1890	1891	Appolon Gombo
1891	1895	Onézime Crepel
1895	1898	Charles François Bonhomme
1898		Eugène Oudet
	1913	Emile Bonneville
1913		Jules Michaux
1919		André Bazeille
1934	1935	Edouard Taltasse

Mayors from 1995

From	To	Name
1995	2020	André Drouard
2020	current	Alban Collinet

== Demography ==
The inhabitants of the commune are known as Balanais or Balanaises in French.

Historical population

Year	Pop.	±% p.a.
1793	632	—
1800	646	+0.31%
1806	662	+0.41%
1821	811	+1.36%
1831	1,068	+2.79%
1836	1,196	+2.29%
1841	1,115	−1.39%
1846	1,245	+2.23%
1851	1,274	+0.46%
1866	1,510	+1.14%
1872	1,545	+0.38%
1876	1,736	+2.96%
1881	1,676	−0.70%
1886	1,693	+0.20%
1891	1,606	−1.05%
1896	1,496	−1.41%
1901	1,458	−0.51%
1906	1,432	−0.36%

Year	Pop.	±% p.a.
1911	1,400	−0.45%
1921	1,299	−0.75%
1926	1,335	+0.55%
1931	1,351	+0.24%
1936	1,410	+0.86%
1946	1,214	−1.49%
1954	1,344	+1.28%
1962	1,518	+1.53%
1968	1,461	−0.64%
1975	1,419	−0.42%
1982	1,376	−0.44%
1990	1,568	+1.65%
1999	1,612	+0.31%
2007	1,653	+0.31%
2012	1,591	−0.76%
2017	1,618	+0.34%
2023	1,579	−0.41%

Source: EHESS and INSEE

== Culture and heritage ==
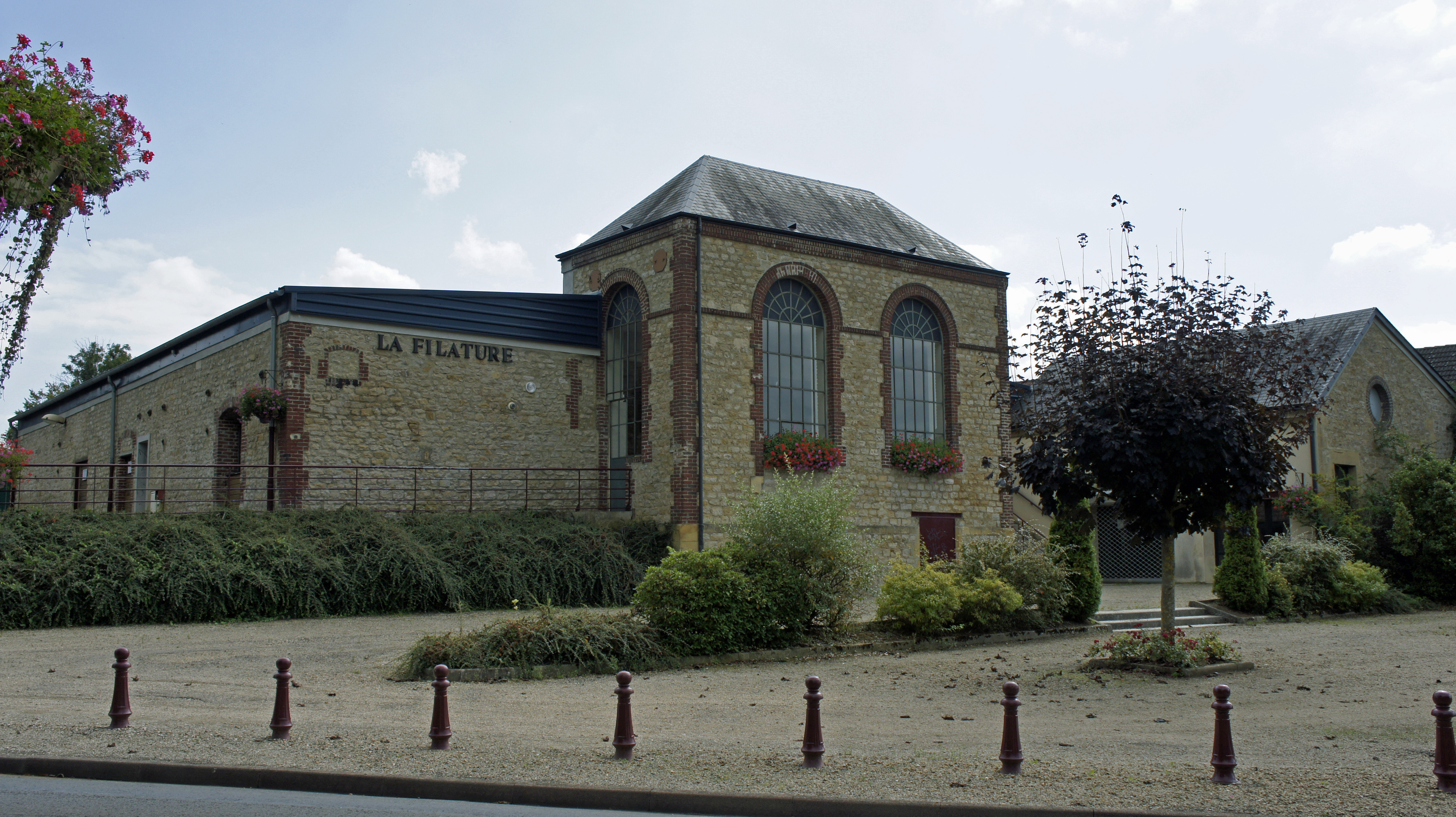
The Bonhomme Spinning Mill

=== Civil heritage ===
The commune has several buildings and sites that are registered as historical monuments:

- The Bonhomme Spinning Mill (Now a Community Hall) (19th century)
- The Godchaux Weaving Mill (Now a Warehouse) (20th century)
- The Stackler Textile Works (Now a Business incubator) (19th century)
- The Bazaille Chard Plant (1906)

== Notable people linked to the commune ==
- Jean-Baptiste Herbin-Dessaux (1765-1832): French General of the Revolution and the Empire, died at Balan.
- Élisabeth Lion (1904-1988), French aviator, born at Balan.

== See also ==
- Communes of the Ardennes department
