= Francheval =

- Commune
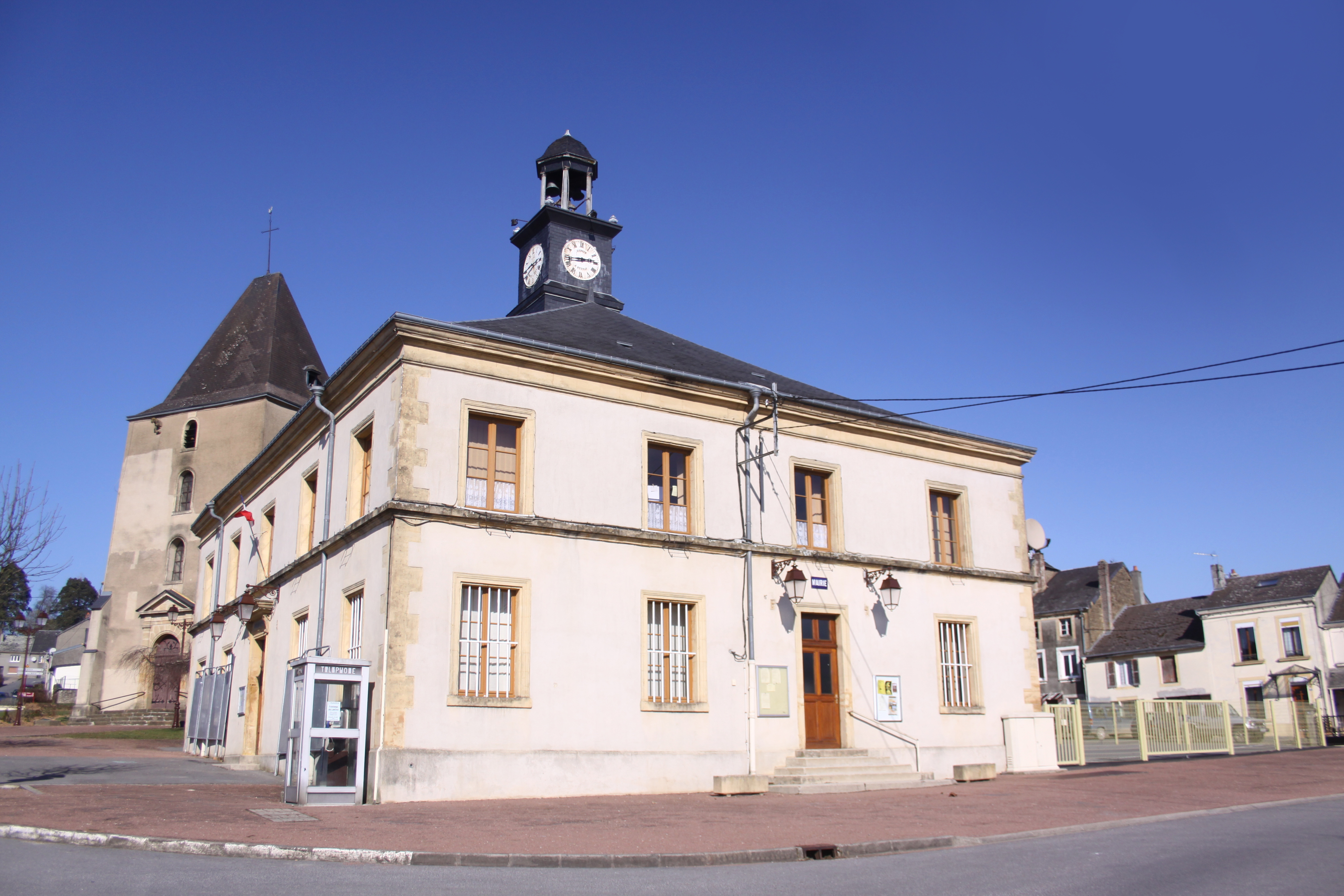
- Town hall

- Coat of arms
- Location of Francheval
- Location within France Location within Grand Est
- Coordinates: 49°42′09″N 5°02′59″E
- Country: France
- Region: Grand Est
- Department: Ardennes
- Arrondissement: Sedan
- Canton: Sedan-3
- Intercommunality: CA Ardenne Métropole

Government
  - Mayor (2022–2026): Marie-Pierre Rebout
- Area^{1}: 19.6 km^{2} (7.6 sq mi)
- Elevation: 220 m (720 ft)
- Population (2023): 590
  - Density: 30/km^{2} (78/sq mi)
- Time zone: UTC+01:00 (CET)
  - Summer (DST): UTC+02:00 (CEST)
- INSEE/Postal code: 08179 /08140
- ^{1} French Land Register data, which excludes lakes, ponds, glaciers > 1 km^{2} (0.386 sq mi or 247 acres) and river estuaries.

Francheval (French pronunciation: [fʁɑ̃ʃ(ə)val]) is a commune in the Ardennes department and Grand Est region of north-eastern France.

== Population ==
Historical population
Year	Pop.	±% p.a.
1968	558	—
1975	539	−0.49%
1982	582	+1.10%
1990	609	+0.57%
1999	593	−0.30%
2007	629	+0.74%
2012	627	−0.06%
2017	609	−0.58%
2023	590	−0.53%
Source: INSEE

== See also ==
- Communes of the Ardennes department
