= Balun (disambiguation) =

Balun can refer to:

- Balun - transfers signal between a balanced line and an unbalanced line.
- Balun, Iran, also Bālūn - village.
- Balún Canán - mayan for nine stars.
- Balun (岜伦村) - village in Bapen Township.

== People ==
- Chas Balun
- Miloslav Balun
- Sonja Balun

== See also ==
- Balonne River - also spelt balun.
- Wynebald de Ballon - also spelt balun.
