= Bala Hissar =

Bala Hissar, Bala Hisar or Balahisar may refer to:

- Bala Hissar, Kabul, a fortress in Kabul, Afghanistan
- Bala Hissar, Peshawar, a fortress in Peshawar, Pakistan
- Bala Hisar, Iran, a village in Iran
- Balahesar, a village in Samangan Province, Afghanistan
