= Bala station =

Bala station may refer to:

== Rail ==
=== US ===
- Bala station (SEPTA), a regional rail station in Bala Cynwyd, Pennsylvania, US

=== Wales ===
- Bala (Penybont) railway station, railway station in Bala, Gwynedd, Wales
- Bala Lake Halt railway station, former railway station in Bala, Gwynedd, Wales
- Bala (New) railway station, a former railway station in Bala, Gwynedd, Wales
- Bala Junction railway station, a former railway station in Bala, Gwynedd, Wales

== See also ==
- Bala (disambiguation)
