= Rubécourt-et-Lamécourt =

- Part of Bazeilles
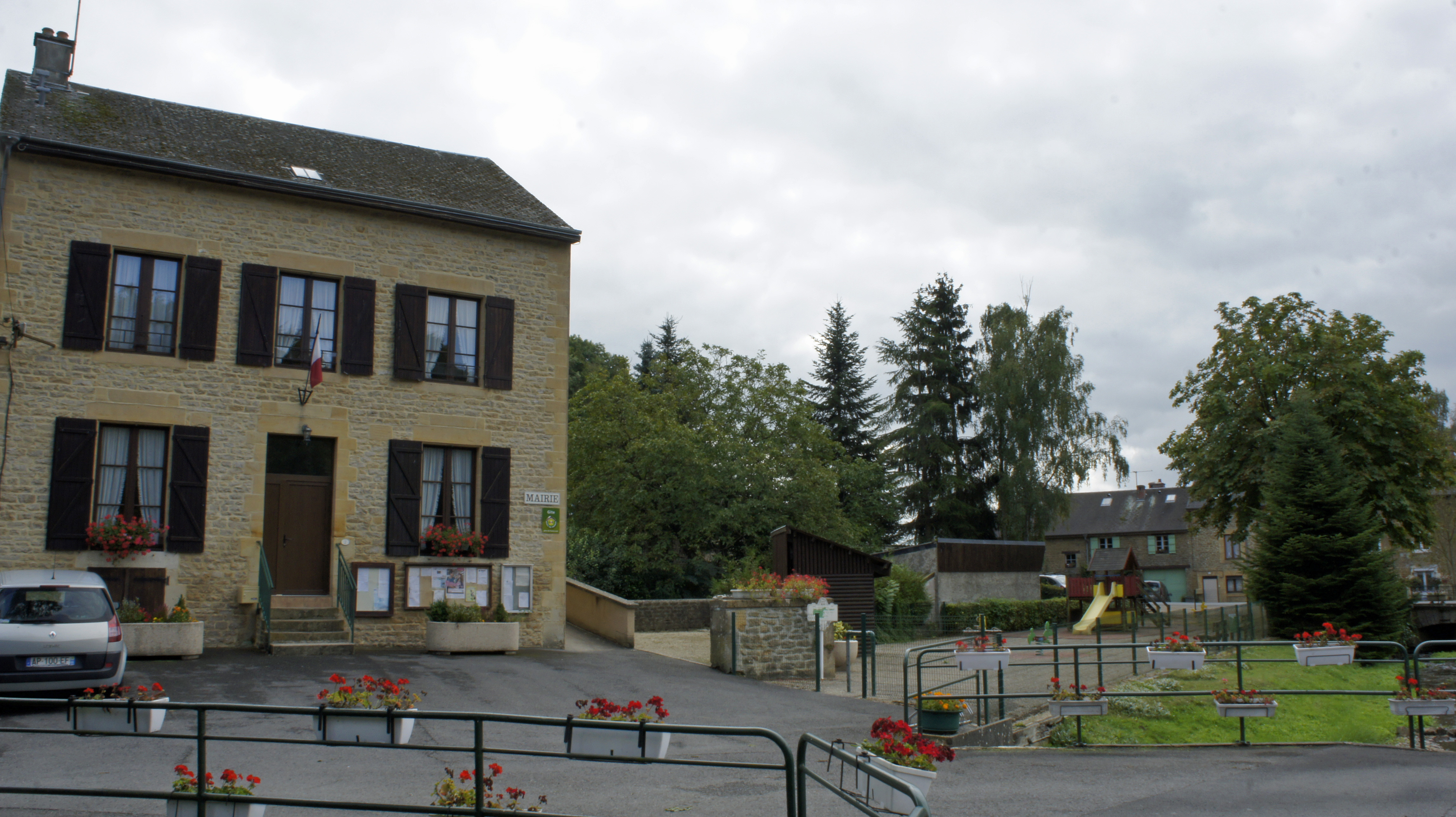
- Town hall

- Coat of arms
- Location of Rubécourt-et-Lamécourt
- Location within France Location within Grand Est
- Coordinates: 49°41′27″N 5°01′24″E
- Country: France
- Region: Grand Est
- Department: Ardennes
- Arrondissement: Sedan
- Canton: Sedan-3
- Commune: Bazeilles
- Area^{1}: 4.61 km^{2} (1.78 sq mi)
- Elevation: 155 m (509 ft)
- Population (2023): 136
  - Density: 29.5/km^{2} (76.4/sq mi)
- Time zone: UTC+01:00 (CET)
  - Summer (DST): UTC+02:00 (CEST)
- Postal code: 08140
- ^{1} French Land Register data, which excludes lakes, ponds, glaciers > 1 km^{2} (0.386 sq mi or 247 acres) and river estuaries.

Rubécourt-et-Lamécourt (French pronunciation: [ʁybekuʁ e lamekuʁ]) is a former commune in the Ardennes department in northern France. On 1 January 2017, it was merged into the commune Bazeilles.

== See also ==
- Communes of the Ardennes department
