= Pouru-Saint-Remy =

- Commune
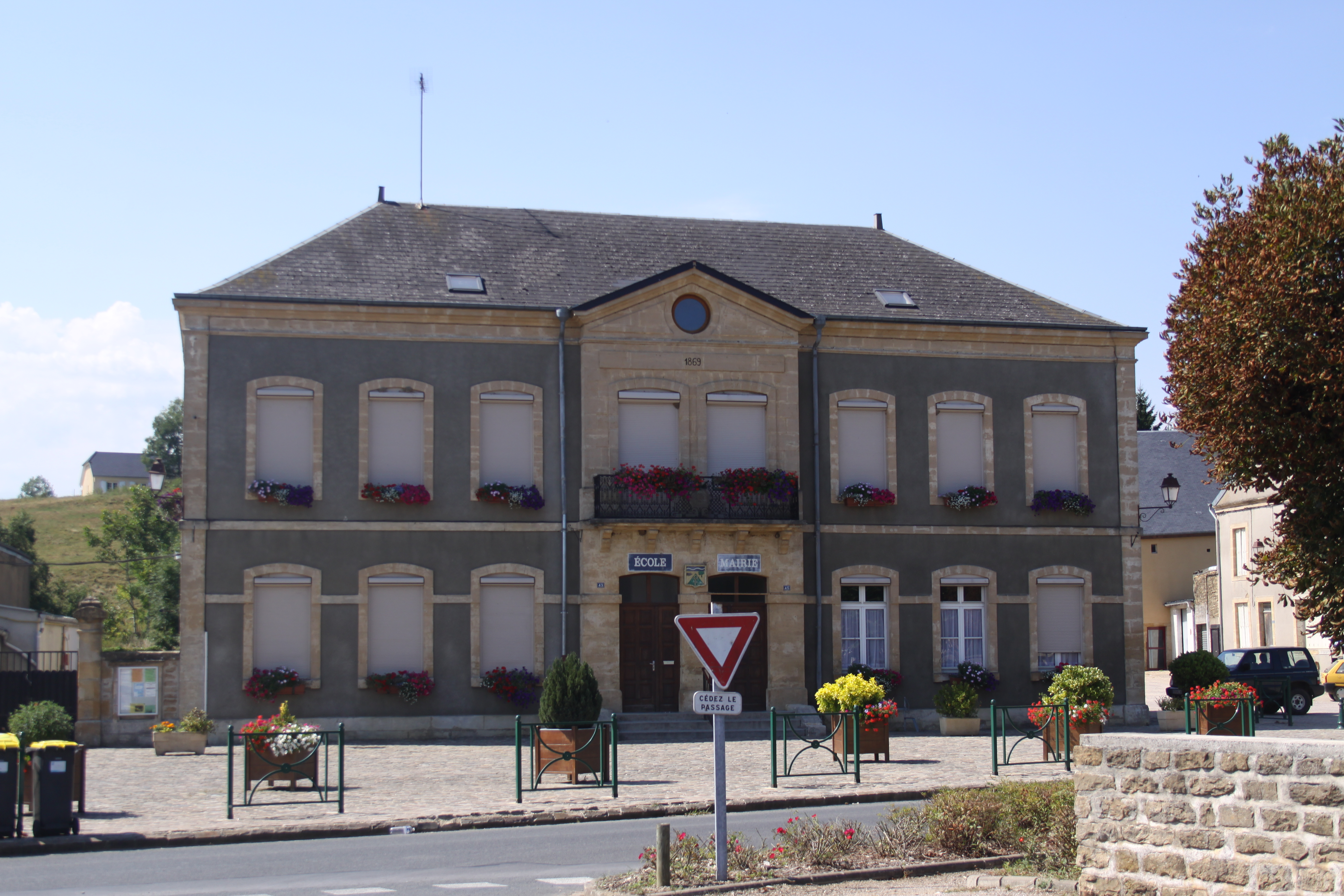
- Town hall and school

- Coat of arms
- Location of Pouru-Saint-Remy
- Location within France Location within Grand Est
- Coordinates: 49°40′47″N 5°05′03″E
- Country: France
- Region: Grand Est
- Department: Ardennes
- Arrondissement: Sedan
- Canton: Sedan-3
- Intercommunality: CA Ardenne Métropole

Government
  - Mayor (2020–2026): Philippe Davenne
- Area^{1}: 10.19 km^{2} (3.93 sq mi)
- Elevation: 163 m (535 ft)
- Population (2023): 1,106
  - Density: 108.5/km^{2} (281.1/sq mi)
- Time zone: UTC+01:00 (CET)
  - Summer (DST): UTC+02:00 (CEST)
- INSEE/Postal code: 08343 /08140
- ^{1} French Land Register data, which excludes lakes, ponds, glaciers > 1 km^{2} (0.386 sq mi or 247 acres) and river estuaries.

Pouru-Saint-Remy (French pronunciation: [puʁy sɛ̃ ʁemi]) is a commune in the Ardennes department in northern France.

== Population ==
Historical population
Year	Pop.	±% p.a.
1968	1,412	—
1975	1,385	−0.28%
1982	1,232	−1.66%
1990	1,166	−0.69%
1999	1,165	−0.01%
2007	1,224	+0.62%
2012	1,224	+0.00%
2017	1,163	−1.02%
2023	1,106	−0.83%
Source: INSEE

== See also ==
- Communes of the Ardennes department
