= Nagamma =

Nagamma is an Indian name, based on the Nāga serpent goddess, and may refer to:

- Bala Nagamma (disambiguation), the name of multiple films
- Nayakuralu Nagamma, statesperson and minister to King Nalagama, the ruler of Palnadu (now in Andhra Pradesh, India)
- Nagamma Keshavamurthy, Indian politician from Karnataka

== See also ==
- Naga (disambiguation)
- E. V. R. Nagammai, Indian women's rights activist
