= Bala Nagamma =

Bala Nagamma may refer to these Indian films:

- Bala Nagamma (1942 film), a Telugu-language film directed by Chittajallu Pullayya
- Bala Nagamma (1959 film), a Telugu-language film directed by Vedantam Raghavaiah
- Bala Nagamma (1966 film), a Kannada-language film directed by P. R. Kaundinya
- Bala Nagamma (1981 film), a Tamil-language film directed by K. Shankar

== See also ==
- Bala (disambiguation)
- Nagamma (disambiguation)
