= Pouru-aux-Bois =

- Commune
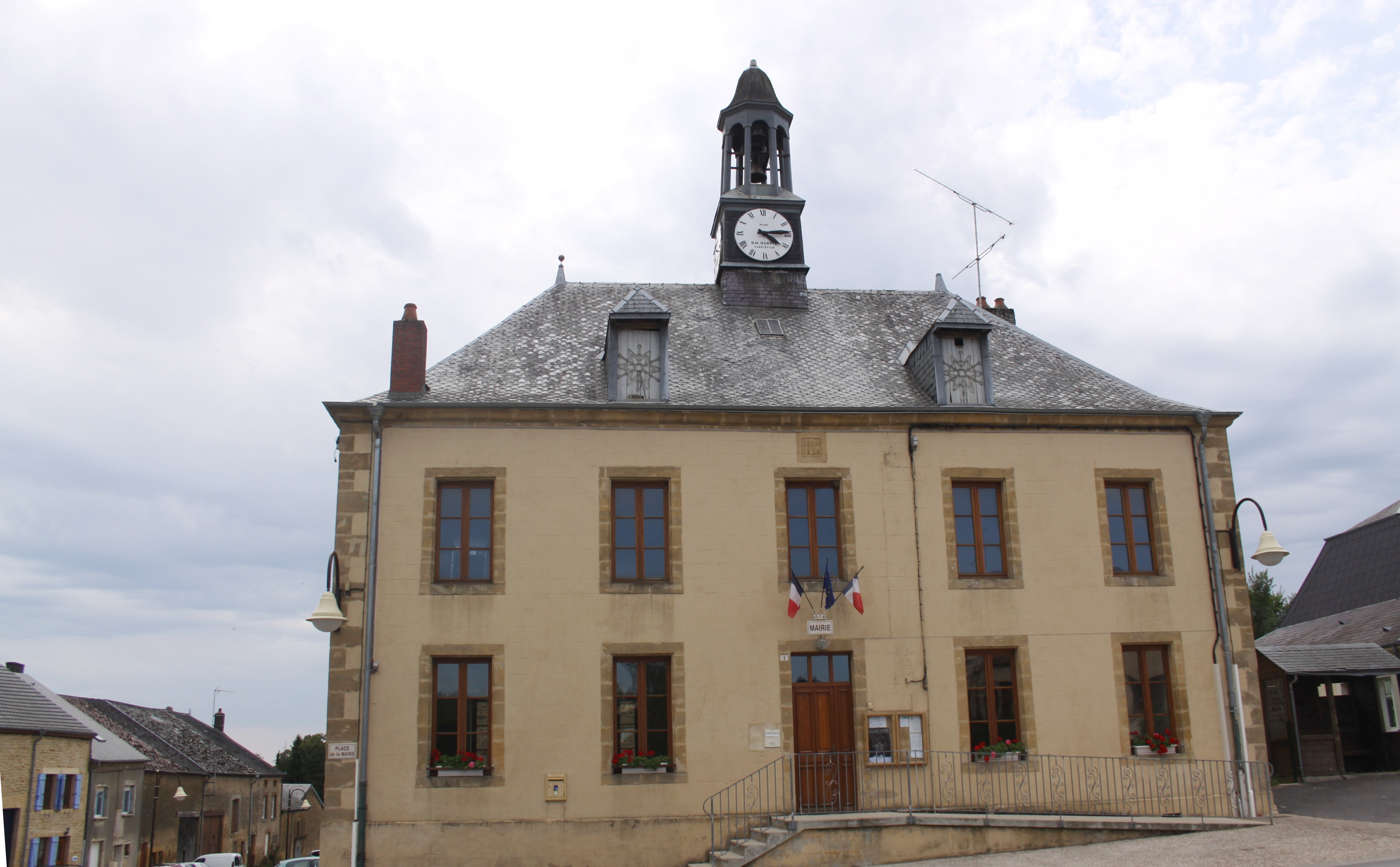
- Town hall

- Coat of arms
- Location of Pouru-aux-Bois
- Location within France Location within Grand Est
- Coordinates: 49°42′25″N 5°05′34″E
- Country: France
- Region: Grand Est
- Department: Ardennes
- Arrondissement: Sedan
- Canton: Sedan-3
- Intercommunality: CA Ardenne Métropole

Government
  - Mayor (2020–2026): Michel Salpetier
- Area^{1}: 9.02 km^{2} (3.48 sq mi)
- Elevation: 224 m (735 ft)
- Population (2023): 234
  - Density: 25.9/km^{2} (67.2/sq mi)
- Time zone: UTC+01:00 (CET)
  - Summer (DST): UTC+02:00 (CEST)
- INSEE/Postal code: 08342 /08140
- ^{1} French Land Register data, which excludes lakes, ponds, glaciers > 1 km^{2} (0.386 sq mi or 247 acres) and river estuaries.

Pouru-aux-Bois (French pronunciation: [puʁy o bwa]) is a commune in the Ardennes department in northern France.

== Population ==
Historical population
Year	Pop.	±% p.a.
1968	268	—
1975	254	−0.76%
1982	257	+0.17%
1990	244	−0.65%
1999	262	+0.79%
2007	286	+1.10%
2012	297	+0.76%
2017	266	−2.18%
2023	234	−2.11%
Source: INSEE

== See also ==
- Communes of the Ardennes department
