= Wala, Nepal =

Coordinates: 27°31′N 87°5′E

Bala वाला
- Village Development Committee
- Interactive map of Bala
- Country: Nepal
- Zone: Kosi Zone
- District: Sankhuwasabha District

Population (1991)
  - Total: 2,863
- Time zone: UTC+5:45 (Nepal Time)

Bala is a Village Development Committee in Sankhuwasabha District in the Kosi Zone of north-eastern Nepal. At the time of the 1991 Nepal census it had a population of 2863 people residing in 576 individual households.
