= Bal, Zira =

Bal
- village
- Location in Punjab, India Bal (India)
- Coordinates: 31.05050745°N 75.07730484°E
- Country: India
- State: Punjab
- District: Firozpur
- Tehsil: Zira
- Elevation: 211 m (692 ft)

Population (2011)
  - Total: 492
- Time zone: UTC+5:30 (IST)
- 2011 census code: 34224

Bal is a village in Firozpur district, Punjab, India. It is located in the Zira tehsil.

== Demographics ==
According to the 2011 census of India, Bal has 103 households. The effective literacy rate (i.e. the literacy rate of population excluding children aged 6 and below) is 68.7%.

Demographics (2011 Census)
	Total	Male	Female
Population	492	252	240
Children aged below 6 years	32	16	16
Scheduled caste	79	43	36
Scheduled tribe	0	0	0
Literates	316	169	147
Workers (all)	163	153	10
Main workers (total)	139	134	5
Main workers: Cultivators	121	120	1
Main workers: Agricultural labourers	9	7	2
Main workers: Household industry workers	0	0	0
Main workers: Other	9	7	2
Marginal workers (total)	24	19	5
Marginal workers: Cultivators	2	2	0
Marginal workers: Agricultural labourers	16	12	4
Marginal workers: Household industry workers	1	0	1
Marginal workers: Others	5	5	0
Non-workers	329	99	230
