= Helan-e Safarali =

Helan-e Safarali هلان صفرعلي
- Village
- Location within Iran
- Coordinates: 38°57′44″N 47°31′08″E
- Country: Iran
- Province: East Azerbaijan
- County: Ahar
- Bakhsh: Hurand
- Rural District: Chahardangeh

Population (2006)
  - Total: 145
- Time zone: UTC+3:30 (IRST)
  - Summer (DST): UTC+4:30 (IRDT)

Helan-e Safarali (Persian: هلان صفرعلي, also Romanized as Helān-e Şafar‘alī; also known as Bālān-e Şafar ‘Alī) is a village in Chahardangeh Rural District, Hurand District, Ahar County, East Azerbaijan Province, Iran. At the 2006 census, its population was 145, in 30 families.
