= Daniela Panetta =

- Born: 22 October 1968 (age 57); Milan, Italy
- Genres: Jazz
- Occupation: Singer
- Instrument: Voice

Daniela Panetta (born 22 October 1968 in Milan) is an Italian jazz vocalist, composer, lyricist and vocalese performer.

== Discography ==
=== Albums ===
Year	Artist	Title	Record label	Notes
1995	Sandro Cerino	Dove portano i campi di fianco alle autostrade	Mingus Live Production	Singer
1996	Daniela Panetta	Fasi Comunicanti	Modern Times	Singer, composer
1997	Giorgio Gaslini	Mr O	Soul Note	Singer
1998	Daniela Panetta, Paola Luffarelli	En Voyage	Caligola	Singer, composer
1999	Michele Franzini	Percorsi obbligati	Panastudio Production	Singer
2000	Paolo Conte	Razmataz	CGD East West	Backing vocalist
2002	Domenico Lafasciano	Grief in New York	VideoRadio	Singer
2003	Paolo Conte	Reveries	CGD	Singer
2003	Roberto Durkovic	Indaco e sabbia	Storie Di Note	Singer
2003	Massimo Priviero	Testimone	XYM	Singer
2003	Ta Matete Living Music	Pienezza	Art'è	Singer
2006	Gianmario Liuni	Un soffio soltanto	Advice Music	Singer
2006	Daniela Panetta, Sandro Cerino	Ampio Respiro	Splasc(h)	Singer, composer
2006		Scimmie 25 anni	Pubblicazioni Edel	Singer
2007	Daniela Panetta, Ivano Malcotti, Sandro Cerino	Schegge	Edizioni Curci	Singer, composer
