= Borj-e Balan =

Borj-e Balan برج بالان
- Village
- Location within Iran
- Coordinates: 33°51′56″N 49°03′55″E
- Country: Iran
- Province: Markazi
- County: Shazand
- Bakhsh: Zalian
- Rural District: Zalian

Population (2006)
  - Total: 104
- Time zone: UTC+3:30 (IRST)
  - Summer (DST): UTC+4:30 (IRDT)

Borj-e Balan (Persian: برج بالان, also Romanized as Borj-e Bālān; also known as Bālān and Bārān) is a village in Zalian Rural District, Zalian District, Shazand County, Markazi Province, Iran. At the 2006 census, its population was 104, in 25 families.
