= Balan, West Azerbaijan =

Balan بالان
- Village
- Location within Iran
- Coordinates: 36°10′43″N 45°31′54″E
- Country: Iran
- Province: West Azerbaijan
- County: Sardasht
- Bakhsh: Central
- Rural District: Gavork-e Sardasht

Population (2006)
  - Total: 158
- Time zone: UTC+3:30 (IRST)
  - Summer (DST): UTC+4:30 (IRDT)

Balan (Persian: بالان, also Romanized as Bālān) is a village in Gavork-e Sardasht Rural District, in the Central District of Sardasht County, West Azerbaijan Province, Iran. At the 2006 census, its population was 158, in 29 families.
