= Pietro Pajetta =

Italian painter (1845–1911)

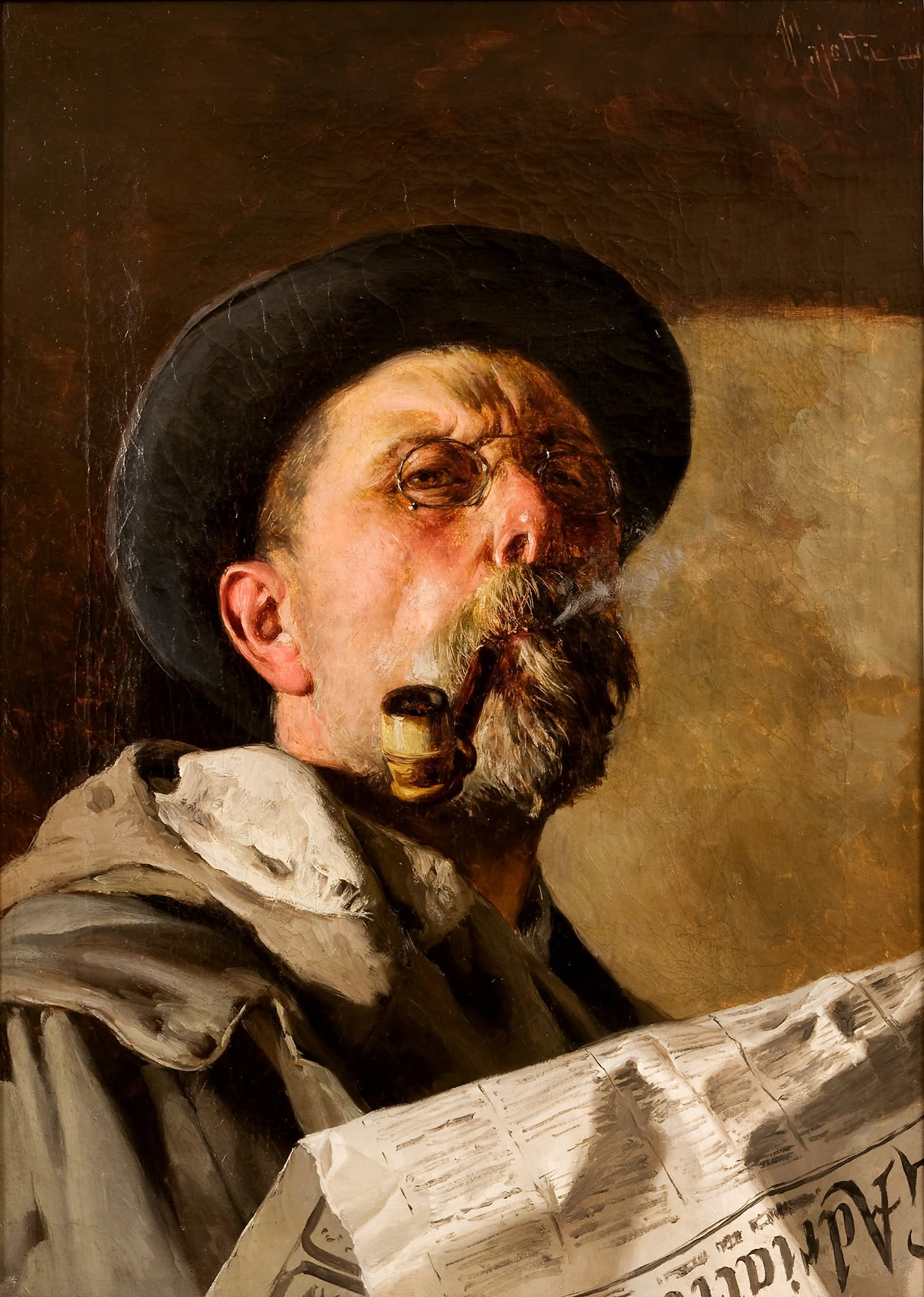
- Self-portrait
- Born: March 22, 1845; Serravalle, Vittorio, Austrian Empire
- Died: April 10, 1911 (aged 66); Padua, Kingdom of Italy
- Known for: Painting
- Movement: Genre art

Pietro Pajetta (March 22, 1845 – April 10, 1911) was an Italian painter, mainly of genre subjects.

== Biography ==
Pajetta initially had planned to enter a religious order in order to be able to become a painter, but at the start of the War of Italian Independence in 1860 he enlisted in the army, despite being only 15 years old. Released from service in Alessandria in 1868, he was married.

Later, the patronage of his prior commander, general Cialdini, gained him entrance to the Academy at Bologna. Both Pietro's father, Paolo, and his brother Mariano Pajetta were painters. His works are described as possessing an exuberance of feeling. His economic position was always precarious.

Among his works are Genius and Poverty, Visit in the City and Morning. His next paintings included Secolo illuminato; Un costume del Settecento; Troppa confidenza; Il futuro conduttore di eserciti; L'andata al mercato; Mercato di buoi; and Il Prediletto. Pajetta was awarded at the Regional Exhibition of Alessandria with gold medal, with a bronze medal in the Treviso in 1872, with silver medal to that of Rovigo in 1877, and in others.

In 1872 he took part in the Exhibition of Treviso, with a painting titled Soap Bubble; Visit in the city and in the morning. He painted paintings of rustic genre subjects as well as animals. In 1881, he sent to Milan il Requies and I vagabondi; in 1883, in Rome, La preghiera and Nono no xè sì bon, and at Venice, Unico patrimonio, at the 1884 the Crystal Palace Exhibition in London in 1884, several works that earned him a silver medal; in 1893 at Milan, Ammalato?, awarded a gold medal, in 1895, in Venice, Interior of Stable, in 1898 at Turin, Landscape and The Joy of Family, the latter winning the Levi award; in 1900 at Verona, Stalla di buoi; in 1902 at the Quadrennial in Turin, he displayed: Stalla; Preghiera and Angelo custode; in 1904, in Padua, the sketch of Follie and Testa di donna; in the 1906 Exhibition held in Milan for the inauguration of the new Sempione Pass, La preghiera and a portrait of the musician Cesare Pollini of Padua in 1908, in Milan, San Sebastiano and Al pascolo; in 1909 in Munich, Fiori selvatici, and the same year he was invited to exhibit at the Paris Salon Exhibition.

Other notable works include: Sosta; Raggio di sole; Self-portrait; Spirito e cose; I vinti; Cantando la ninna nanna; L’odio; Madonna addolorata; Santa Barbara; Head of Christ; Ecce Ancilla Domini; Arrivo di Sant’Antonio morente all’Arcella; Estasi dei Francescani; Morte di Sant’Antonio; Apparizione alla Beata Margherita Alacoque; Adorazione del Ss. Sacramento; and Madonna with Saints Anthony and Francis.

Among his notable portraits: Caterina Boccaloni of the Malaspina family; the bishop Callegari; monsignor Pietro Balan, and the astronomer Sacchi.

Pajetta also decorated the ceiling of the building Camerini in Piazzola sul Brenta and the ceiling of the church of San Giovanni Ilarione above Vicenza: the decoration of the villa Valduga in Feltre, the frescoes in the Cathedral of Padua and in a villa of Vittorio Veneto.

== Works ==
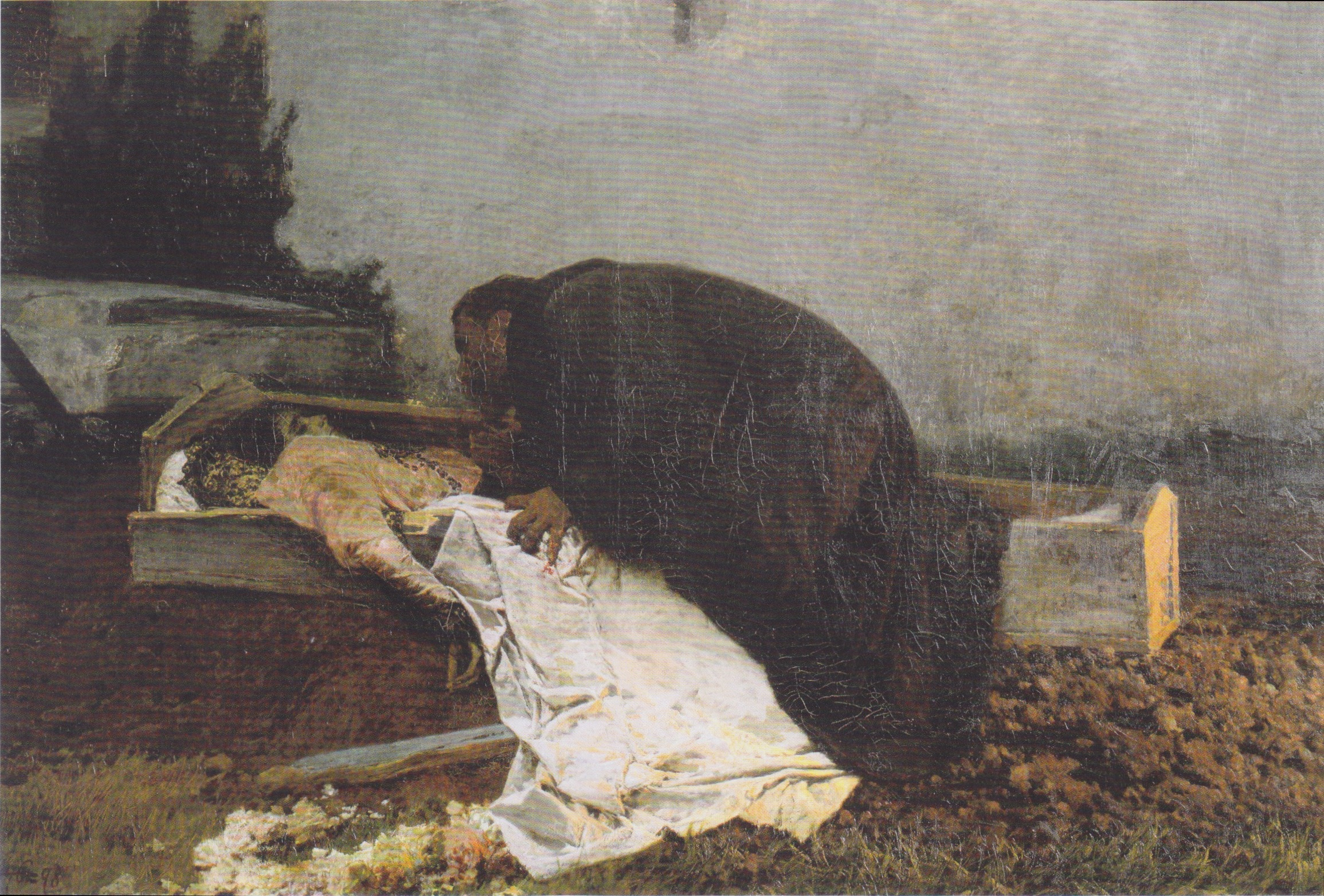
The Hatred (1896)

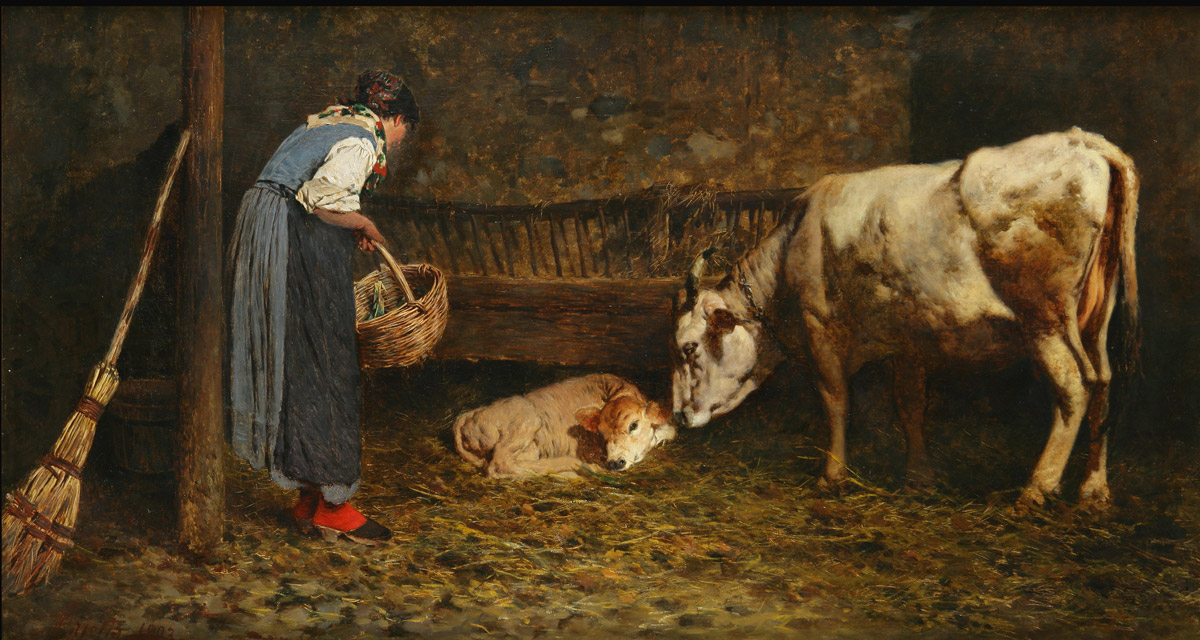
The Newborn (1883)

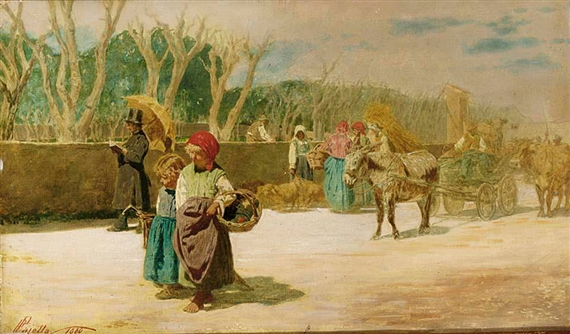
Going to the Market (1880)

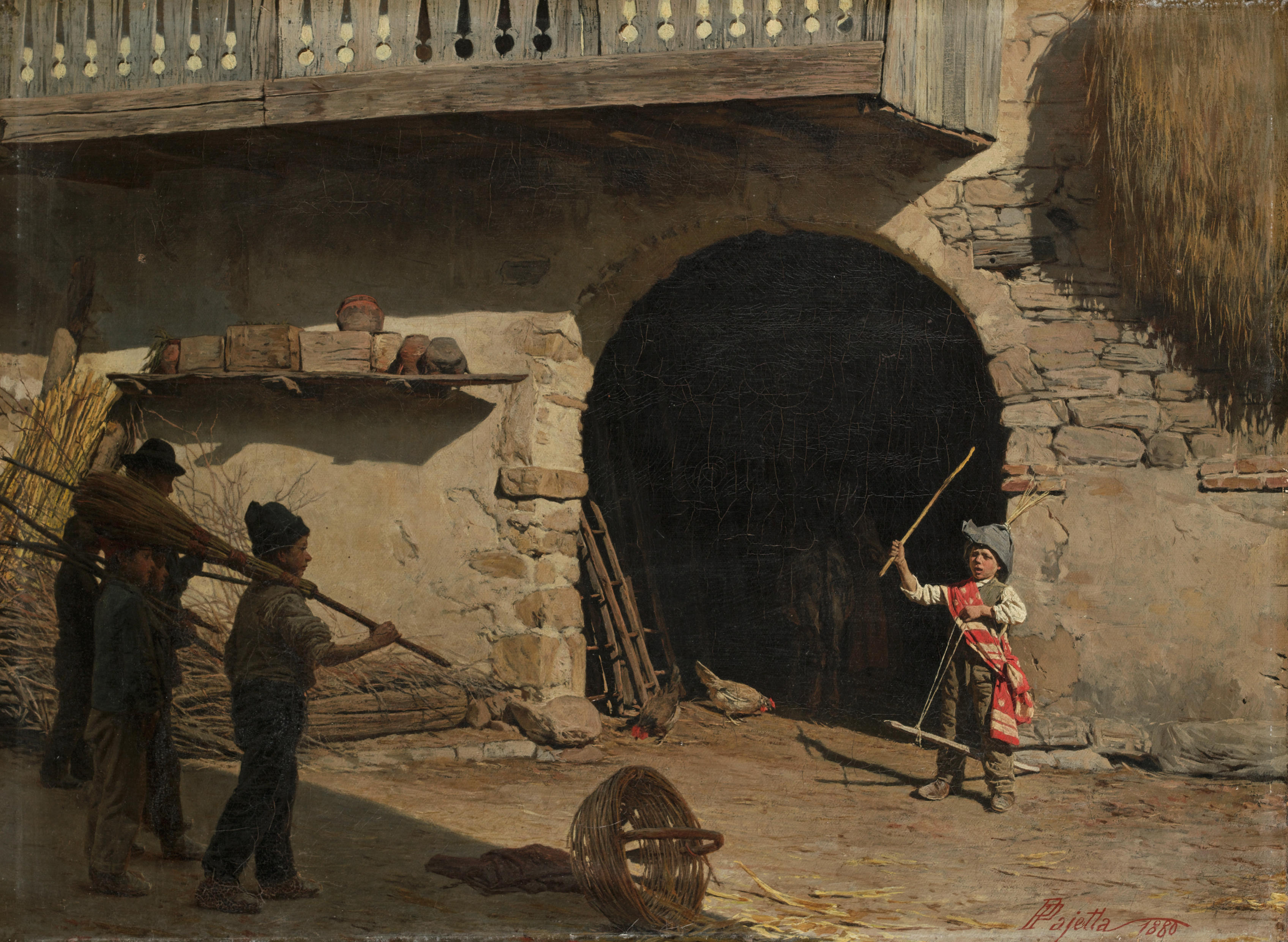
On Guard (1880)
