= Mariano Pajetta =

Italian painter (1851–1923)

Mariano Pajetta (6 January 1851 in Serravalle, Vittorio – 3 March 1923 in Verona) was an Italian painter, mainly of genre and landscape scenes. He was well known for his decorative wall frescoes.

His father Paolo was a landscape artist. His brother, Pietro Pajetta, was also a painter. He was a resident of Serravalle. Self-taught, he has sent many works to exhibitions, including in 1881 to Venice: Acrobati and Effetti del gioco; to the 1883 Promotrice: Al pascolo; to the 1883 Exhibition at Milan: Vita campestre, All'abbeveratoio, and In posa. The latter two were also displayed in 1883 at Rome. In 1884 at Turin, he sent: Stalla con animali, belonging to Paolo Gambierasi, and Et nunc et semper.

He resided in Genoa, where he became known for his decorative wall frescoes, though he did not abandon his easel works, painting Al mercato nel Veneto, displayed in 1886 at Genoa. He returned to live in the Veneto, and by 1910 had settled in Verona, and dedicated himself to painting atop of photographs, collaborating with the studios of Moro in Venice, and Bressanini in Verona.
