= Bherulal Balani =

Pakistani politician

Bherulal Balani (Sindhi: ڀيرو لال بلاڻي;Urdu: بھیرولال بالانی) is a politician from Tharparkar, Sindh, Pakistan.

Bherulal Balani was elected as a MPA in Provincial Assembly of Sindh in the 1997 elections, and was appointed Parliamentary Secretary for Power and Irrigation Department.

He served as Chairman of the Khidmat Committee of the District of Tharparkar, and played a leading role in Scheduled Caste Federation of Pakistan. He was elected as MPA in 1997 general elections and joined PML N led by former Prime Minister Mohammad Nawaz Sharif.

Balani joined the Pakistan Peoples Party on 20 February 2017
