= Bala, Prayagraj =

Village in Uttar Pradesh, India

Coordinates: 32°59′N 74°45′E

Bala is a village in Prayagraj, Uttar Pradesh, India.
