= Panetta =

Origin
- Meaning: someone who sells bread
- Region of origin: Italy

Panetta is an Italian surname. Notable people with the surname include:

- Daniel Panetta (born 1992), Canadian rock musician and producer
- Daniela Panetta (born 1968), Italian jazz vocalist, composer, lyricist
- Fabio Panetta (born 1959), Italian economist, Governor of the Bank of Italy since 2023
- Francesco Panetta (born 1963), former Italian long-distance runner
- Jane Panetta, American curator and art historian
- Janet Panetta (1948–2023), American dancer, teacher, choreographer, and performer
- Jimmy Panetta (born 1969), California politician, son of Leon Panetta
- Karen Panetta, American computer engineer and inventor, Dean of Graduate Education at Tufts University
- Kevin Panetta, American comic book writer
- Leon Panetta (born 1938), former U. S. Secretary of Defense, former Director of Central Intelligence Agency, former U.S. Congressman, and former White House Chief of Staff
- Mike Panetta (born ~1971), the District of Columbia's shadow representative
- Niki Panetta (born 1986), Greek athlete
