= Daigny =

- Commune
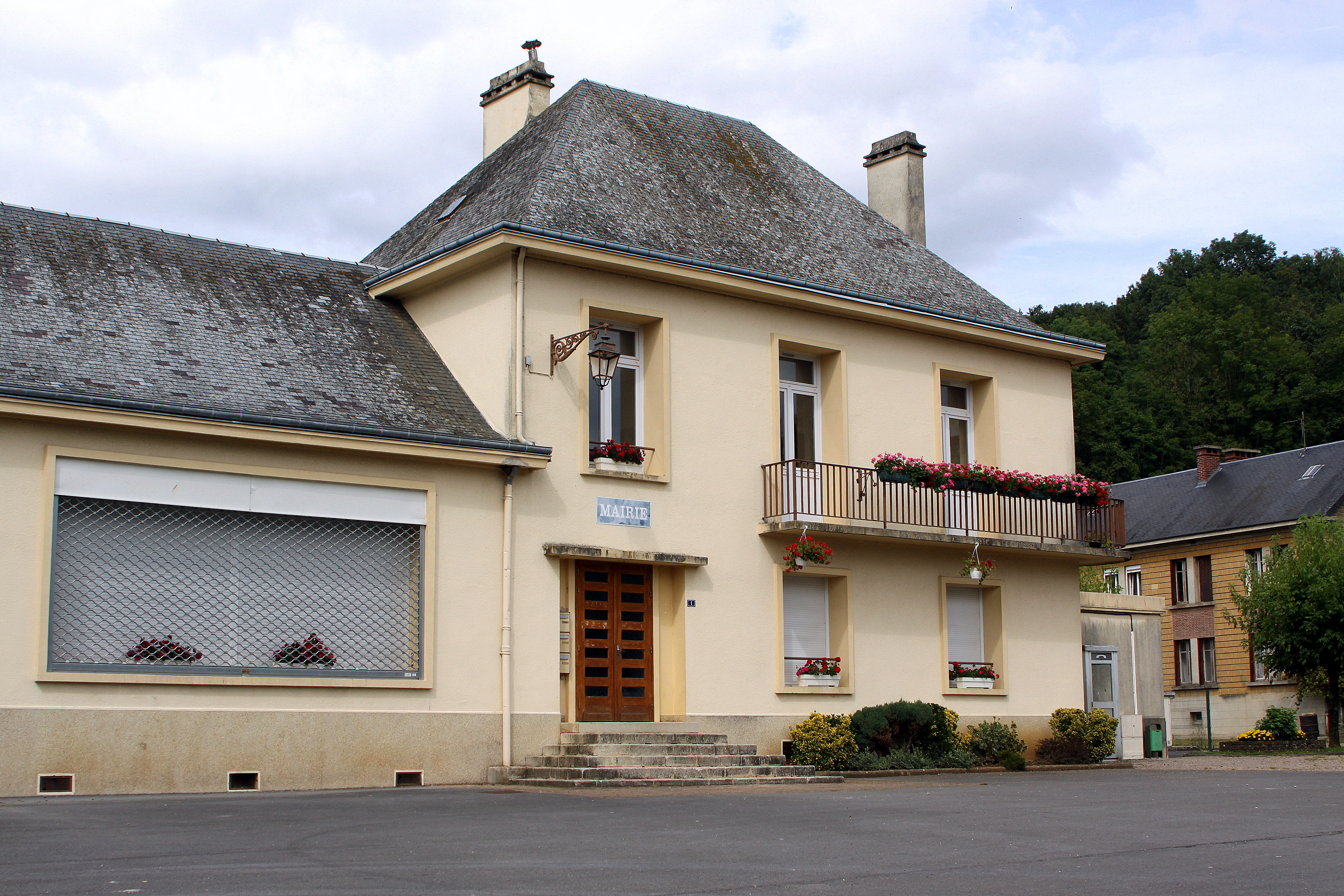
- Town hall

- Coat of arms
- Location of Daigny
- Location within France Location within Grand Est
- Coordinates: 49°42′13″N 4°59′34″E
- Country: France
- Region: Grand Est
- Department: Ardennes
- Arrondissement: Sedan
- Canton: Sedan-3
- Intercommunality: Ardenne Métropole

Government
  - Mayor (2020–2026): Marie-Ange Etienne
- Area^{1}: 2.85 km^{2} (1.10 sq mi)
- Elevation: 170 m (560 ft)
- Highest elevation: 285 m (935 ft)
- Lowest elevation: 170 m (560 ft)
- Population (2023): 358
  - Density: 126/km^{2} (325/sq mi)
- Time zone: UTC+01:00 (CET)
  - Summer (DST): UTC+02:00 (CEST)
- INSEE/Postal code: 08136 /08140
- ^{1} French Land Register data, which excludes lakes, ponds, glaciers > 1 km^{2} (0.386 sq mi or 247 acres) and river estuaries.

Daigny (French pronunciation: [dɛɲi]) is a commune in the Ardennes department in northern France.

== Population ==
Historical population
Year	Pop.	±% p.a.
1968	371	—
1975	367	−0.15%
1982	361	−0.24%
1990	384	+0.78%
1999	352	−0.96%
2007	355	+0.11%
2012	354	−0.06%
2017	349	−0.28%
2023	358	+0.43%
Source: INSEE

== See also ==
- Communes of the Ardennes department
