= Balut Hesar =

Balut Hesar بلوطحصار
- Village
- Location within Iran
- Coordinates: 30°46′44″N 50°21′33″E
- Country: Iran
- Province: Kohgiluyeh and Boyer-Ahmad
- County: Bahmai
- Bakhsh: Central
- Rural District: Kafsh Kanan

Population (2006)
  - Total: 28
- Time zone: UTC+3:30 (IRST)
  - Summer (DST): UTC+4:30 (IRDT)

Balut Hesar (Persian: بلوطحصار, also Romanized as Balūţ Ḩeşār and Balooţ Ḩeşār; also known as Bālā Ḩeşār and Bala Hisār) is a village in Kafsh Kanan Rural District, in the Central District of Bahmai County, Kohgiluyeh and Boyer-Ahmad Province, Iran. At the 2006 census, its population was 28, in 6 families.
