= Bala Murali =

Indian cricket umpire (born 1969)

Personal information
- Born: 31 May 1969 (age 57); Thrippunithura, India

Umpiring information
- ODIs umpired: 3 (1994–1997)
- Source: ESPNcricinfo, 26 May 2014

Krishna Swamy Bala Murali (born 31 May 1969) is a former Indian cricket umpire. He stood in three ODI games from 1994 to 1997.

== See also ==
- List of One Day International cricket umpires
