= Pietro Balan =

Italian Catholic journalist and historian

Pietro Balan (September 3, 1840 – 1893) was an Italian Catholic journalist and historian. He used newly opened Vatican archive material to write about the Reformation.

== Life ==
He was born at Este, Veneto on 3 September 1840, and was educated in the seminary at Padua, where he was appointed professor in 1862. He was director of the Venetian journal La Libertà Cattolica in 1865, and of the Modena journal Diritto Cattolico in 1867. In 1879 he became subarchivist of the Vatican, but retired (or was dismissed) on a pretext of poor health four years later, moving to Pragatto in the province of Bologna. He was nominated chamberlain by Pope Leo XIII in 1881, and domestic prelate in the following year; in 1883 he was appointed referendary of the Papal segnatura, and was also created a commander of the Order of Franz Joseph.

== Works (incomplete list) ==
- Monumenta reformationis Lutheranæ (Ratisbon, 1883–4).
- Fra Paolo Sarpi (Venice, 1887)
