= Ballan (surname) =

Ballan is a surname. Notable people with the surname include:

- Alessandro Ballan (born 1979), Italian cyclist
- Fahd Ballan (1933–1997), Syrian singer
- Giada Ballan (born 1973), Italian synchronized swimmer
- Hani Ballan (born 1967), Qatari football executive
- Sam Ballan (1911–1998), known by his pen name Sam Marcy, American Marxist
- Yousef Hani Ballan (born 1996), Qatari football player
