= Ardennes (department) =

Department of France

Ardennes Årdenes (Walloon)
- Department
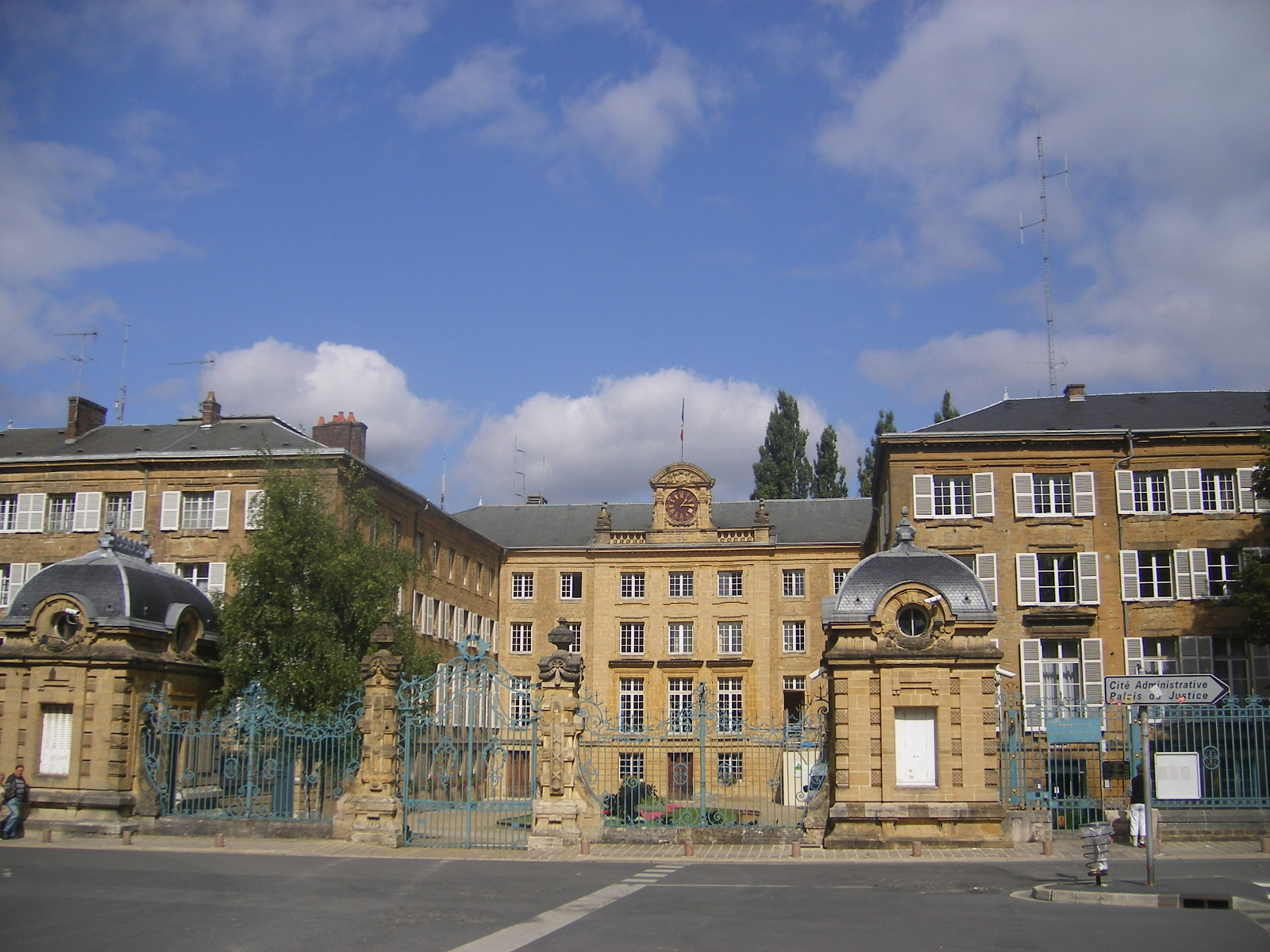
- Prefecture building of the Ardennes department, in Charleville-Mézières

- Flag Coat of arms

- Location of Ardennes in France
- Coordinates: 49°30′N 4°40′E
- Country: France
- Region: Grand Est
- Prefecture: Charleville-Mézières
- Subprefectures: Rethel; Sedan; Vouziers

Government
  - President of the Departmental Council: Noël Bourgeois (LR)

Area^{1}
  - Total: 5,229 km^{2} (2,019 sq mi)

Population (2023)
  - Total: 265,893
  - Rank: 80th
  - Density: 50.85/km^{2} (131.7/sq mi)
- Demonym: Ardennais or Ardennaises
- Time zone: UTC+1 (CET)
  - Summer (DST): UTC+2 (CEST)
- ISO 3166 code: FR-08
- Department number: 08
- Arrondissements: 4
- Cantons: 19
- Communes: 447
- ^1 French Land Register data, which excludes estuaries, and lakes, ponds, and glaciers larger than 1 km^{2}

Ardennes (French: [aʁdɛn]) is a department in the Grand Est region of northeastern France named after the broader Ardennes. Its prefecture is the town Charleville-Mézières. The department has 265,893 inhabitants (2023). The inhabitants of the department are known as Ardennais or Ardennaises.

== Geography ==
=== Political geography ===
The department of Ardennes is bounded by Aisne to the west, Marne to the south, Meuse to the east and Belgium (Provinces of Namur, Luxembourg and Hainaut) to the north.

=== Human geography ===
The district is crossed in its northern part by the winding Meuse valley where most people live and activities are focused. Charleville-Mézières and Sedan are the main urban centres.

It is in the catchment of the Academy of Reims and the jurisdiction of the Court of Appeal of Reims.

The statistical code and Post Code prefix is 08.

=== Physical geography ===
Ardennes is part of the Ardennes, a plateau deeply cut by the Meuse and its many tributaries which reach into Wallonia in Belgium, Luxembourg, Germany (Eifel), and the north of the neighbouring department of Meuse.

Covering 5,229 square kilometres (2,019 square miles), the department was the smallest among the four contributors to Champagne-Ardenne. It is diverse in climate, topography, natural vegetation and land use, which is a mixture of forest and arable farming.

The highest point is 504 m, on the southern slopes of the Croix Scaille shared by French commune Les Hautes-Rivières and the Belgian commune of Gedinne.

It is in this part of the Ardennes mountains or high hills that the Meuse winds through, known locally as "the valley". Flowing into the northern part of the department, it waters the main cities of Sedan, Charleville-Mézières, and Nouzonville. It has numerous tributaries – the main ones locally being the Semois and the Chiers.

As to the south, the Aisne flows through the vast near-treeless plain of Champagne chalk (historically by the landed class and bourgeoisie disparaged as flea-ridden Champagne) extended to the south-west by the small, grain-growing Porcien, Thiérache in the west and Argonne in the east are fringe grasslands with very distinctive upper soils.

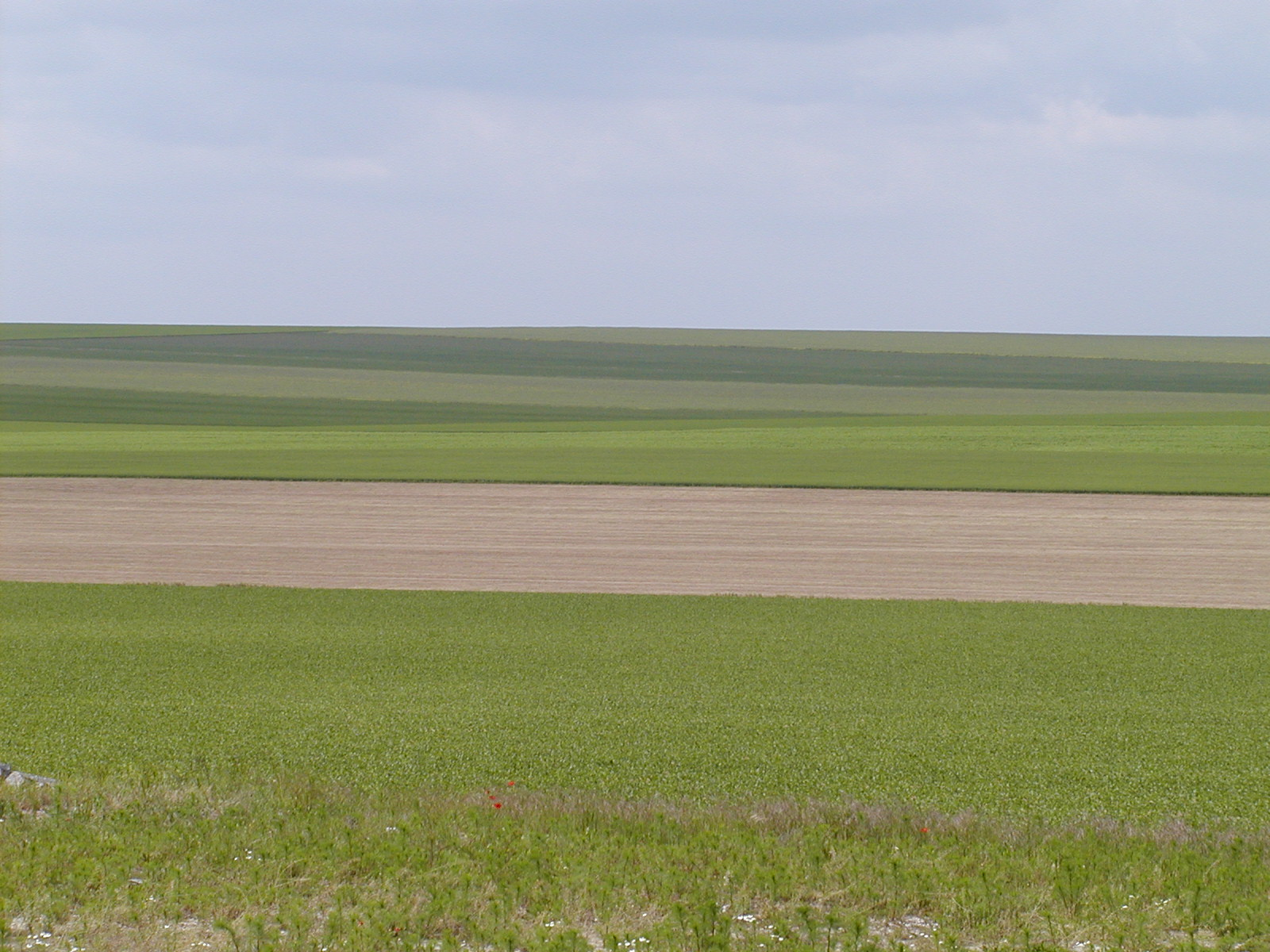
A typical landscape of Champagne chalk in the south of the department.

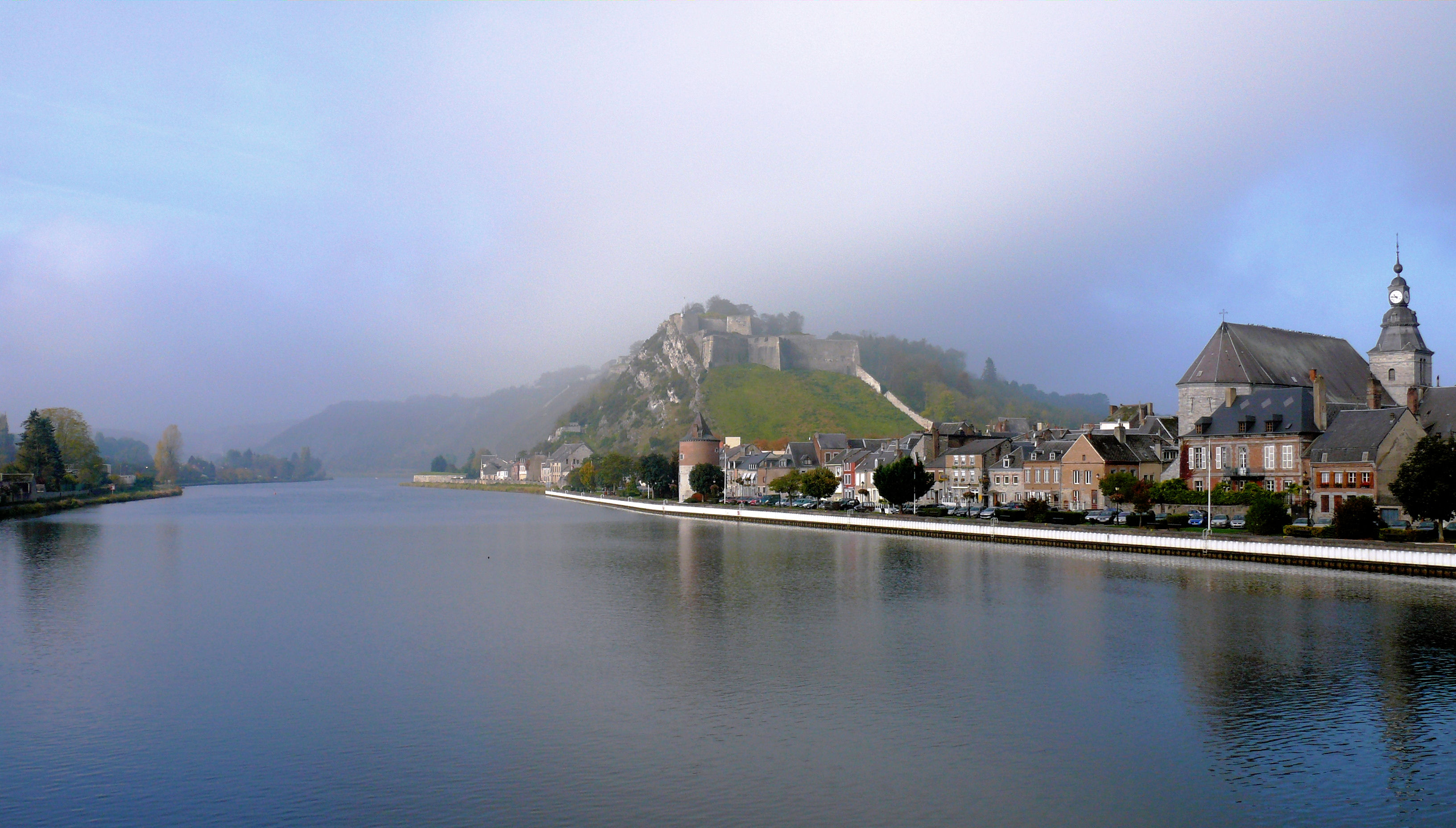
View of the Meuse valley in the north of the department at Givet.

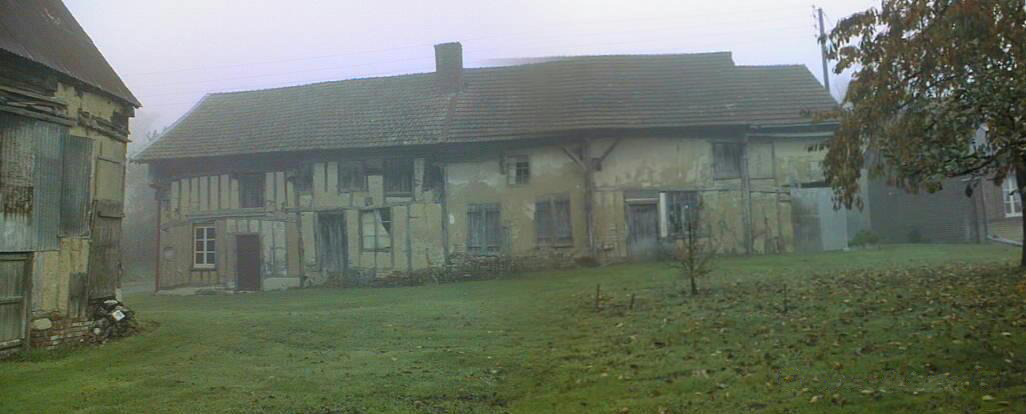
Farm of Porcien in the south-west of the department.

=== Climate ===
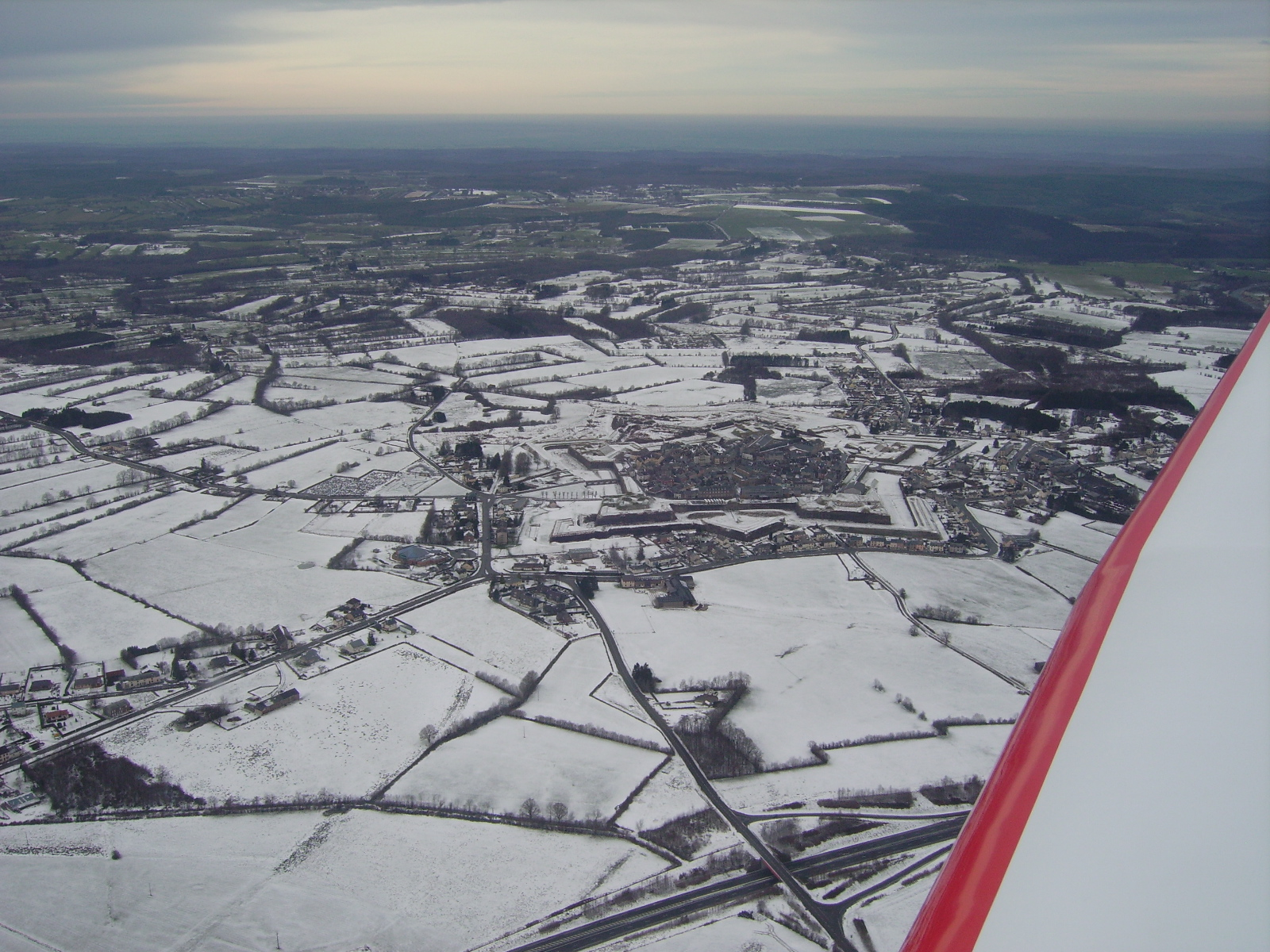
Rocroi in the snow – shallow to deep snow in winter is likely in this department.

The department does not have a uniform climate throughout its territory, especially most winters.

From the north near Aisne and the border with Belgium, through the centre near the canton of Omont, to the south of the valley of the Meuse, the climate is considered "degraded continental" (heavy rainfall in autumn and frequent frosts in winter). The rest of the department has a "degraded oceanic" or "temperate continental" climate (relative to an oceanic climate, the winters are colder and the summers are hotter, rainfall in the lowlands is lower and winds are of lower strength). All this stems from location, midway between the English Channel, the North Sea and parts of the continent relatively far from any sea.

Winter can be as cold as inner continental lowland Europe some winters and quite often snowier, particularly near main settlements Rocroi, Givet and Sedan in the north.

This climatic difference is particularly pronounced in the presence of frost especially in the valleys of the Meuse, Semoy, the plateau of Rocroi, and around the Croix-Scaille where it can be very marked and persists longer in the year with great influence on vegetation.

Across lands further west and south frontal zones (affecting air and precipitation) are tempered more by the English Channel, Bay of Biscay and North Sea; nearby seeing quite flat terrain – isolated small ranges or lower regions of hills, excluding the mountains across much of the south-eastern third of France.

== Demography ==
Historical population

| Year | Pop. | ±% p.a. |
|---|---|---|
| 1791 | 247,612 | — |
| 1801 | 246,925 | −0.03% |
| 1821 | 266,985 | +0.39% |
| 1831 | 290,622 | +0.85% |
| 1841 | 319,167 | +0.94% |
| 1851 | 331,296 | +0.37% |
| 1861 | 329,111 | −0.07% |
| 1872 | 320,217 | −0.25% |
| 1881 | 333,675 | +0.46% |
| 1891 | 324,923 | −0.27% |
| 1901 | 315,589 | −0.29% |
| 1911 | 318,896 | +0.10% |
| 1921 | 277,811 | −1.37% |
| 1931 | 293,746 | +0.56% |

| Year | Pop. | ±% p.a. |
|---|---|---|
| 1936 | 288,632 | −0.35% |
| 1946 | 245,335 | −1.61% |
| 1954 | 280,490 | +1.69% |
| 1962 | 300,247 | +0.85% |
| 1968 | 309,380 | +0.50% |
| 1975 | 309,306 | −0.00% |
| 1982 | 302,338 | −0.32% |
| 1990 | 296,357 | −0.25% |
| 1999 | 290,130 | −0.24% |
| 2007 | 284,749 | −0.23% |
| 2012 | 282,778 | −0.14% |
| 2017 | 273,579 | −0.66% |
| 2023 | 265,893 | −0.47% |

=== The evolution and distribution of the population ===
There were 330,000 people at the end of the 19th century. The two world wars have each time resulted in a loss of population (such as the "exodus" of 1940). Since 1968 the population has been declining, mainly due to a negative migration balance.

That the major urban areas of the department are the most affected is characterized by a stagnation of the population – a population decline of up to 2% compared to 1999 in the city centres and suburbs (Charleville-Mézières, Revin, Fumay, Givet, Rethel).

The communes, however, are gaining inhabitants (the phenomenon of urban sprawl). This is explained by the search for better living in the countryside which matches the desire of many people to build a small land-holding, typically a house with land to the detriment of their proximity to their workplace. This highly contemporary concept favours commuting between Home and Work. This is the phenomenon of suburbanization which has become common in the whole of France from which Ardennes does not escape.

On 1 January 2023, the Ardennes population stood at 265,893 inhabitants. The population is declining in urban areas but five times less than in rural areas. The limited decline in the urban space where two-thirds of the Ardennes people live is the result of two opposite dynamics. Semi-urban communes have gained 0.5% of inhabitants per year over the period 1999–2006 at the expense of urban centres (downtown and suburbs) which lost 0.6% per year. For thirty years the population has lagged in the main cities of Ardennes. Between 1999 and 2006, the annual decline was 0.2% for Sedan and Rethel, 1.8% for Revin, and 1% for Charleville-Mézières. The most unfavourable rural population change came from degradation of rural employment centres, such as Fumay or Vouziers and to a lesser extent that of their periphery. This was slightly mitigated by a small increase in population in other rural communes.

=== Main towns ===
The most populous commune is the prefecture Charleville-Mézières. As of 2023, there are six communes with more than 5,000 inhabitants:

| Commune | Population (2023) |
|---|---|
| Charleville-Mézières | 45,560 |
| Sedan | 16,667 |
| Rethel | 7,444 |
| Givet | 6,364 |
| Revin | 5,716 |
| Nouzonville | 5,523 |

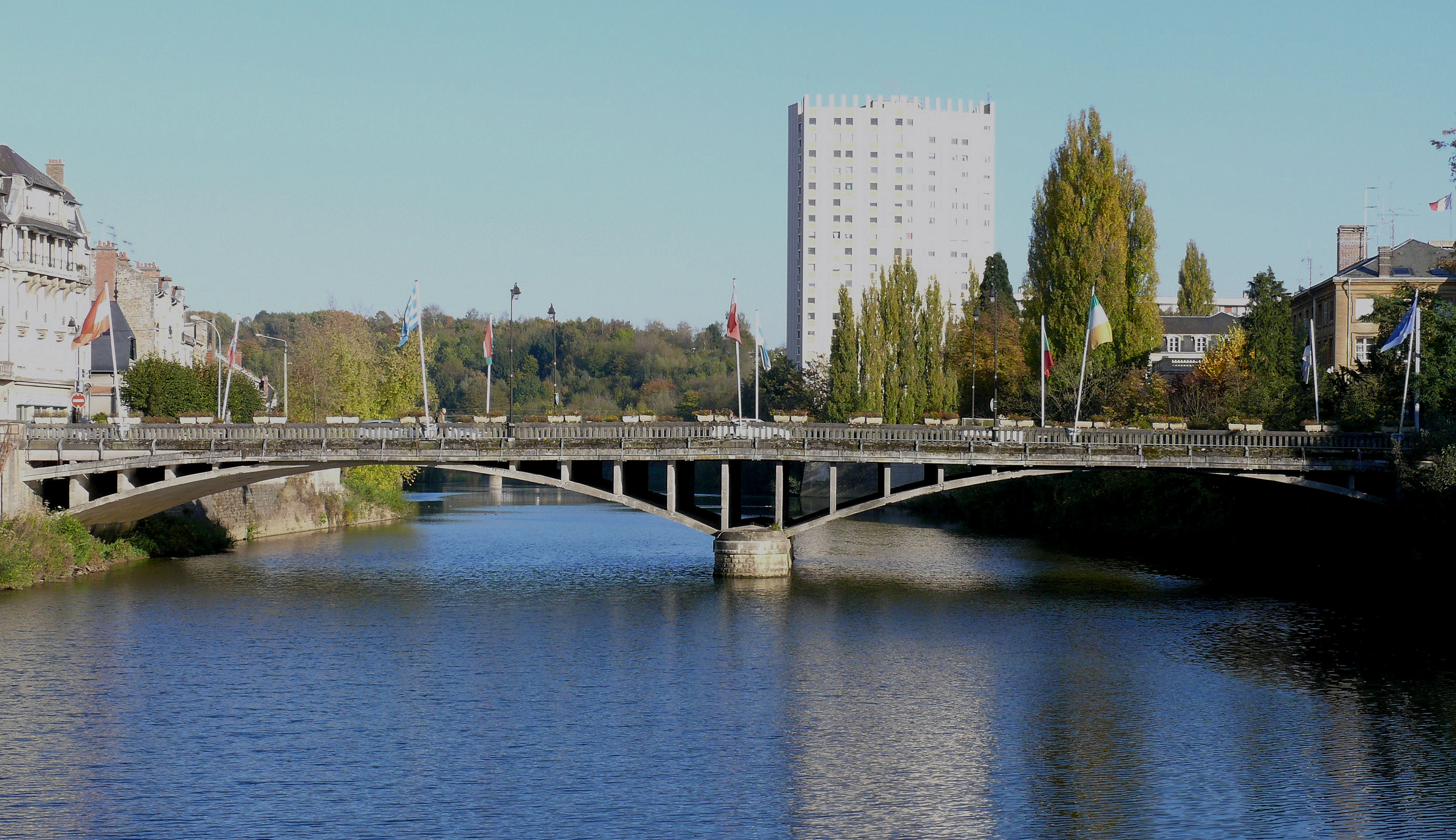
Charleville-Mézières on the Meuse, the main town of Ardennes and the third largest agglomeration in Champagne-Ardenne.

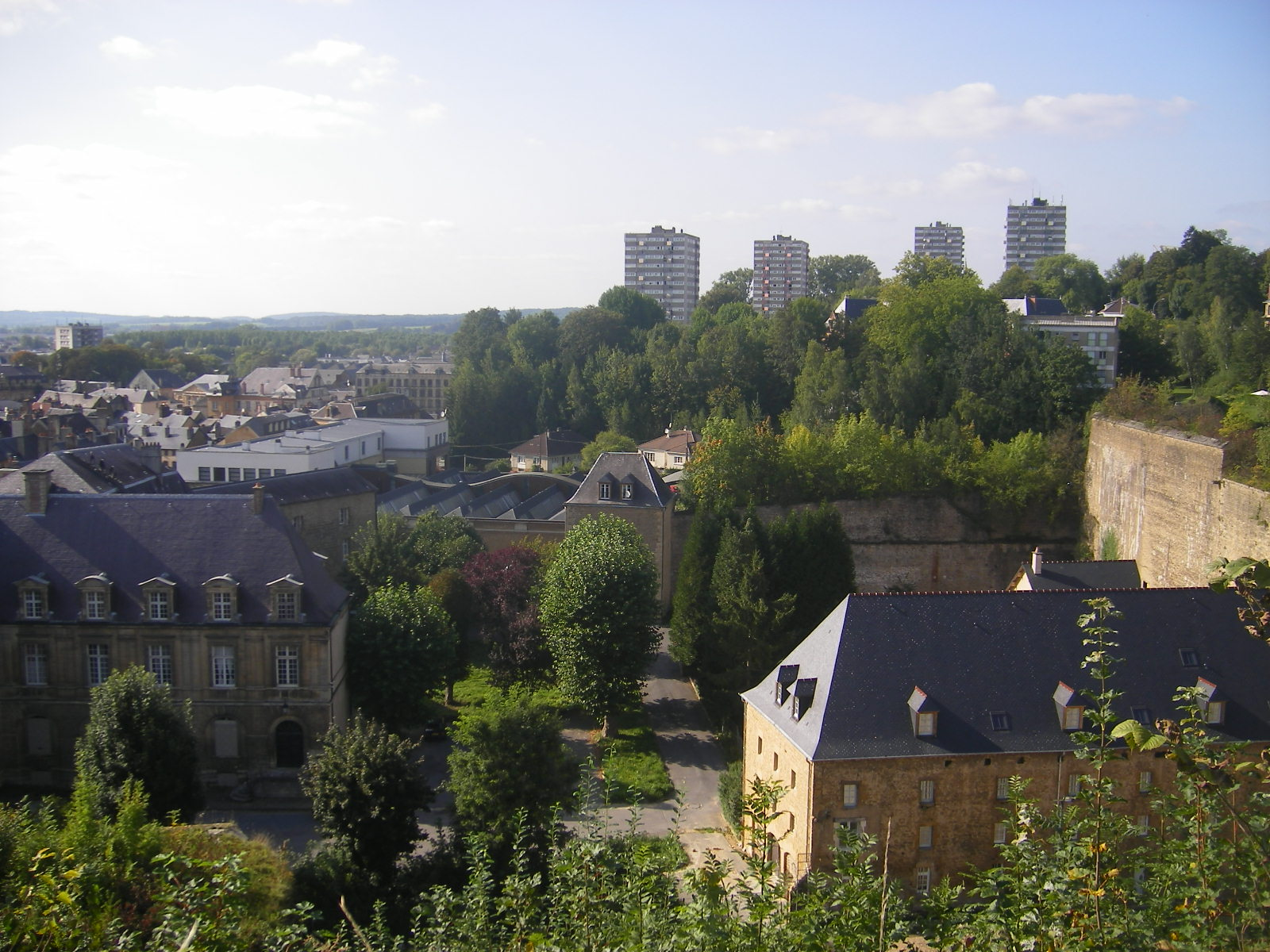
Sedan, also watered by the Meuse, is at the heart of the second largest urban area of Ardennes.

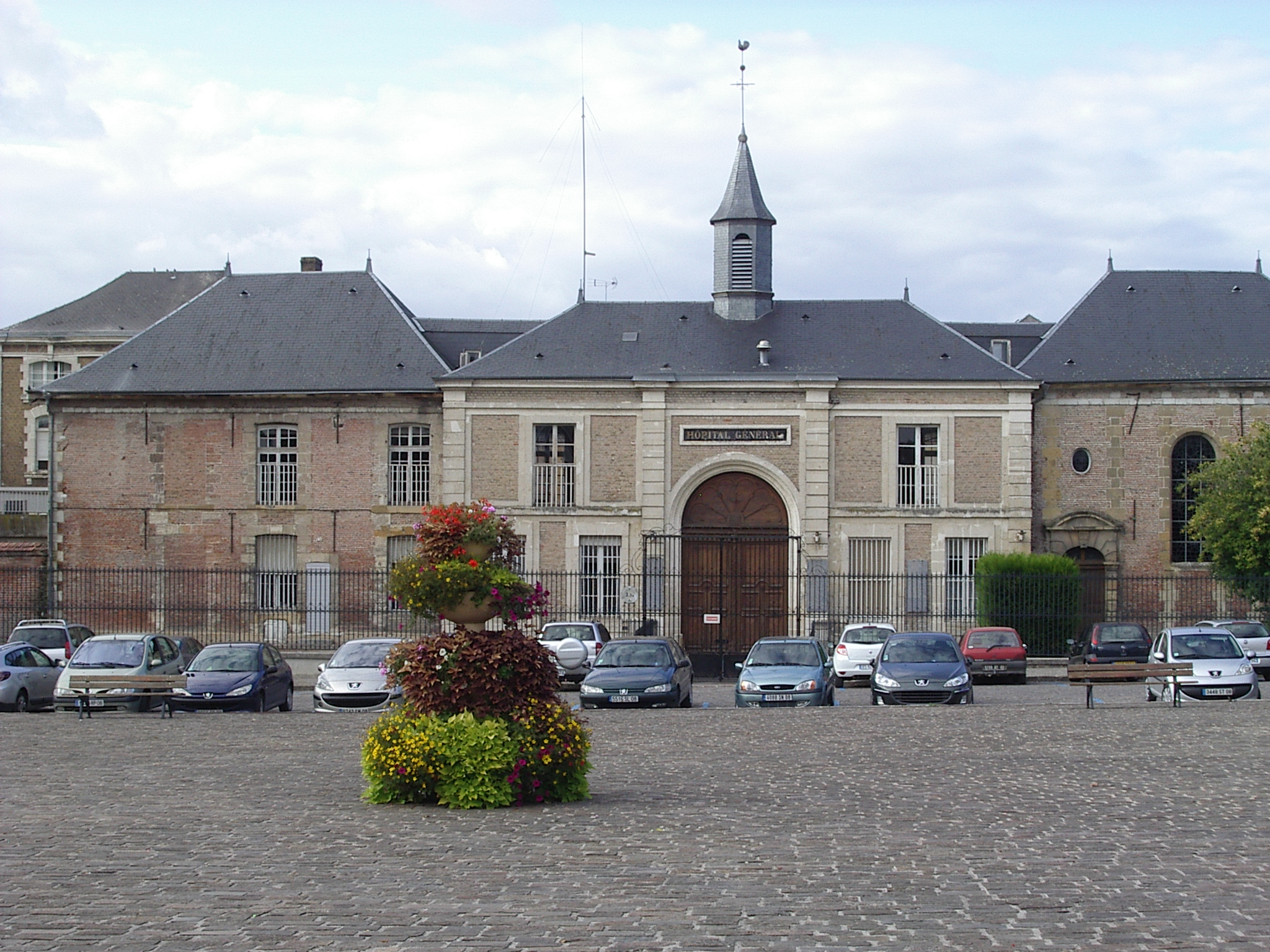
Rethel, a city watered by the Aisne, is the third largest city of Ardennes and also the third largest urban area.

== History ==
The department is one of the original 83 departments created during the French Revolution on 4 March 1790 under the Act of 22 December 1789. It includes part of the former provinces of Champagne and Argonne, several principalities including those of Arches and Sedan, countships (such as Rethel), and different areas returned to France (from the former Spanish Netherlands) in the 18th century.

On 12 May 1793, the department expanded itself with the Bailiwick of Liège, Couvin, and the countships from the Holy Roman Empire of Fagnolle and on 26 October 1795 a part of the Duchy of Bouillon.

After the victory of the allies in the Battle of Waterloo on 18 June 1815, the second Treaty of Paris subtracted territory from Ardennes to attach to the Netherlands: Duchy of Bouillon, Couvin, Mariembourg, Fagnolle, and Philippeville. In addition, the department was occupied by Prussian troops from June 1815 to November 1818.

On 2 September 1870, Sedan was the place of surrender for Napoleon III at the Battle of Sedan against the troops of the Prussian states, a coalition commanded by Helmut von Moltke. The King of Prussia Wilhelm I, the future emperor of the Imperial Germany, and Bismarck viewed the battle from the hills overlooking Sedan. The defeat marked the end of the Second Empire, and at the same time the birth of the French Third Republic on 4 September 1870.

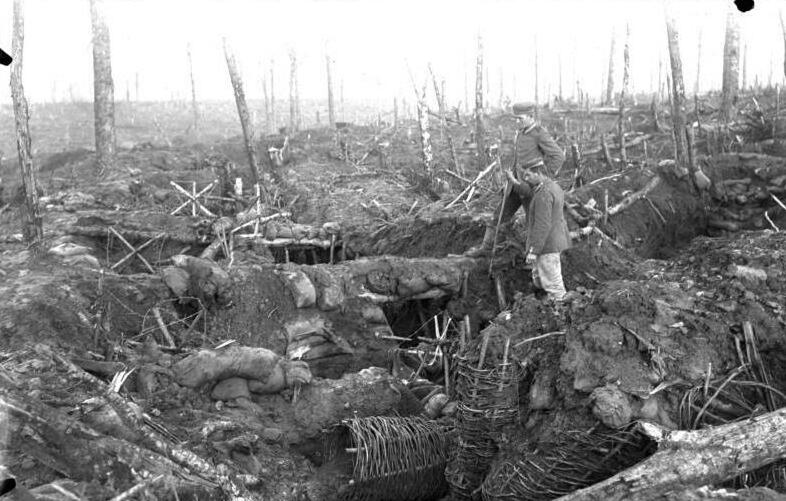
Forest of Argonne in October 1915 ravaged by shellfire.

During the two world wars, for strategic reasons, the region each time became the passage for the invading armies because of the narrow width of the Meuse and its deep valley. The French military believed that the region was defended by its terrain and thick forests present in the north of the department and so neglected the defence of the territory. During the First World War, the Battle of the Ardennes was fought in the department, and Charleville-Mézières became the headquarters of the German Crown Prince. It was at Vouziers and other places that the Czechoslovak legions fought, and it was also near the same city that the aeroplane of Roland Garros was shot down.

It was the only French department to have been fully occupied during that conflict, except for northern Lorraine (Moselle) and Alsace, which had been under German administration since 1871.

During the Second World War, the main effort of the German army was again focused on this area, especially on the right bank of the River Meuse, symbolized by the breakthrough at Sedan which would lead the French troops into the strategic trap the Yellow Plan designed by General von Manstein and approved by Hitler.

It is in this department that the Maginot Line ended: the last fort of the line (Fort Villy la Ferte) was located about five kilometres from Carignan. The French General staff did not want to continue the line of defence along the border with Belgium, a neutral and friendly country. Furthermore, they hoped that the unique geography and the forest would stop the German army.

After the armistice of 1940, Ardennes was declared a "forbidden zone" (actually a German settlement area) throughout the occupation by the Nazi army.

In 1944, the Battle of the Bulge was fought partly in this department.

=== Etymology ===
The name of the department is related to the toponym Ardenne which could derive from the Gallic ardu meaning "high". It would have been transformed into Arduenna by the Romans to designate the ancient Ardennes forest and the mountains mentioned by Julius Caesar in the work attributed to him: Commentaries on the Gallic War. Arduenna Sylva was used for the pine forest on the plateau of Bastogne. It was then transformed into Ardenna in the 6th century.

This toponym is absent from the names of communes in the department of Ardennes while those of Argonne (Beaumont-en-Argonne), Porcien (Château-Porcien, Novion-Porcien, Chaumont-Porcien, and even Champagne (Vaux-Champagne) are sometimes fused and all have a connotation of regional belonging. This is why the name of Ardenne is not specific to the department as it is found in many other parts of France – for example in western and central-western France, (Note: This toponym is present 5 times in Charentes; notably in the name of the village of Saint-Grégoire-d'Ardennes in Charente-Maritime); principal source: Jacques Duguet, Place names of Charentes, éditions Bonneton, 1995, p. 9 and 10 (in French)) Belgium, and Luxembourg where it has its usual sense – from Celtic origin – of "high", "high woods" or "forest".

=== Heraldry ===
| Arms of the department of Ardennes | Blazon: Azure, a bend argent potent counter potent of Or with an inescutcheon argent charged with a boar in sable; in chief of gules charged with 3 rakes of Or 2 and 1. |

== Administration ==
=== Administrative organization ===
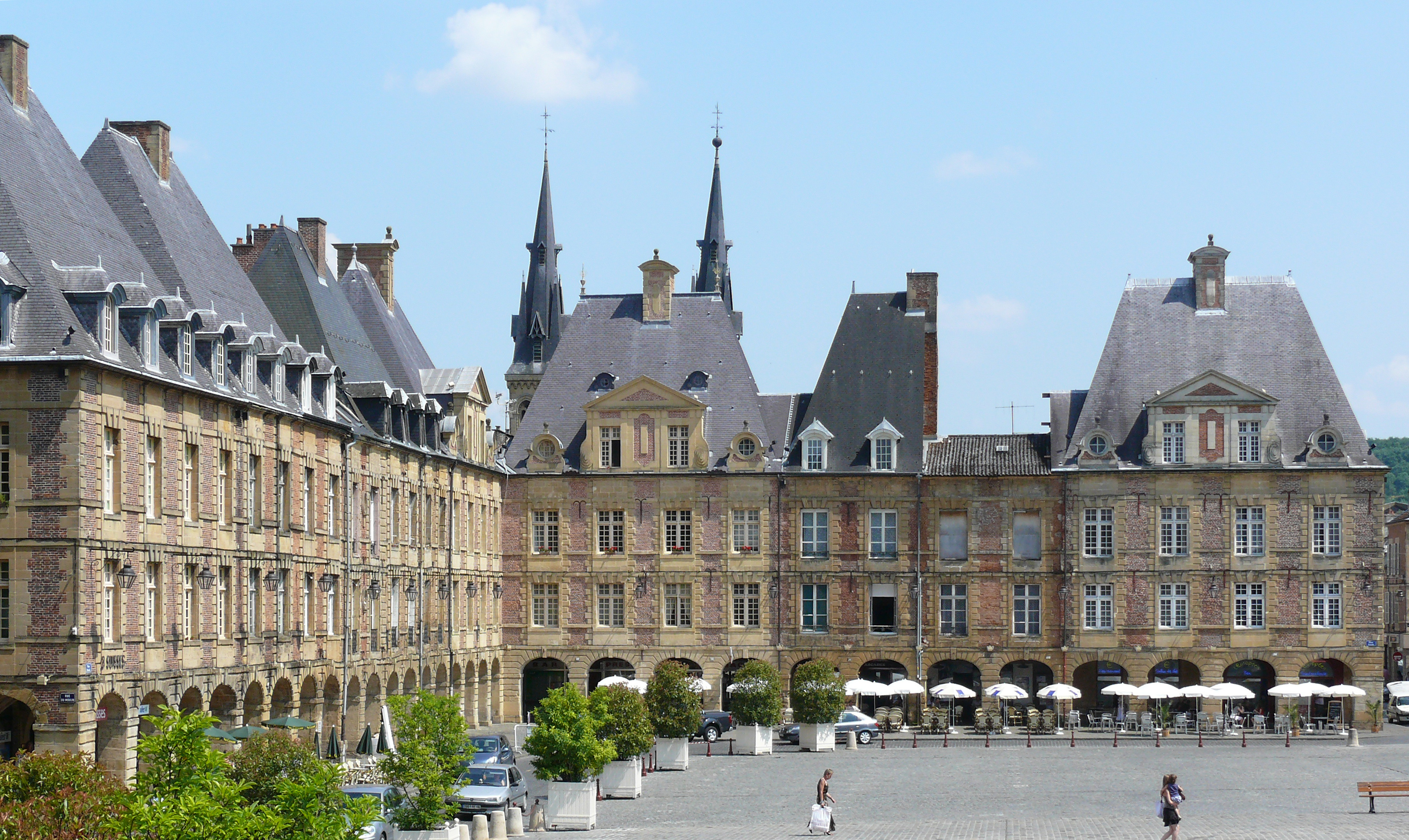
Place Ducale in Charleville-Mézières, prefecture of the Ardennes department.

The seat of the prefecture of the department is at Charleville-Mézières and the three sub-prefectures are Rethel, Sedan, and Vouziers. Rocroi was also a sub-prefecture until 1926. In addition, the departmental seat of the General Council of Ardennes is located at Charleville-Mézières.

=== Territorial organization ===
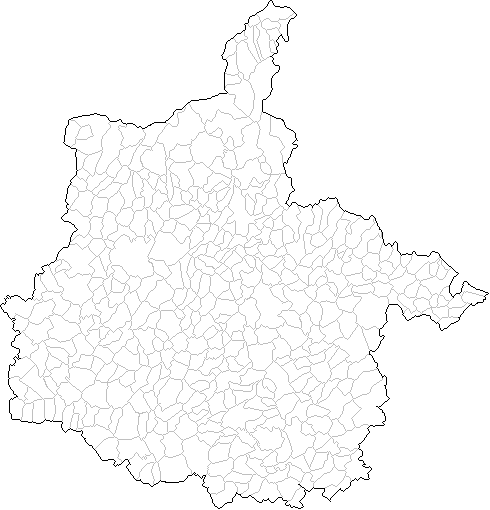
Map of the communes of the Ardennes department.

The Ardennes is composed of 452 communes which are grouped into 19 cantons and four arrondissements of varying sizes.

The largest arrondissement of the department is that of Charleville-Mézières while the smallest is Sedan which is half the size. The two arrondissements that occupy the northern part of the Ardennes, however, have four-fifths of the departmental population.

The other two arrondissements, Rethel and Vouziers, occupy the southern part of the department with roughly comparable areas but are very sparsely populated.

Before the Poincaré decree of 10 September 1926 which removed many sub-prefectures in France, the department had five arrondissements. In addition to the four mentioned above, the fifth was that of Rocroi – a small historic city in the north-west of the department close to Belgium – which has been since annexed in its entirety to the district of Charleville-Mézières. The former arrondissement of Rocroi then consisted of six cantons – including four on the border with Belgium – which were Givet, Fumay, Revin, Rocroi, Rumigny, and Signy-le-Petit.

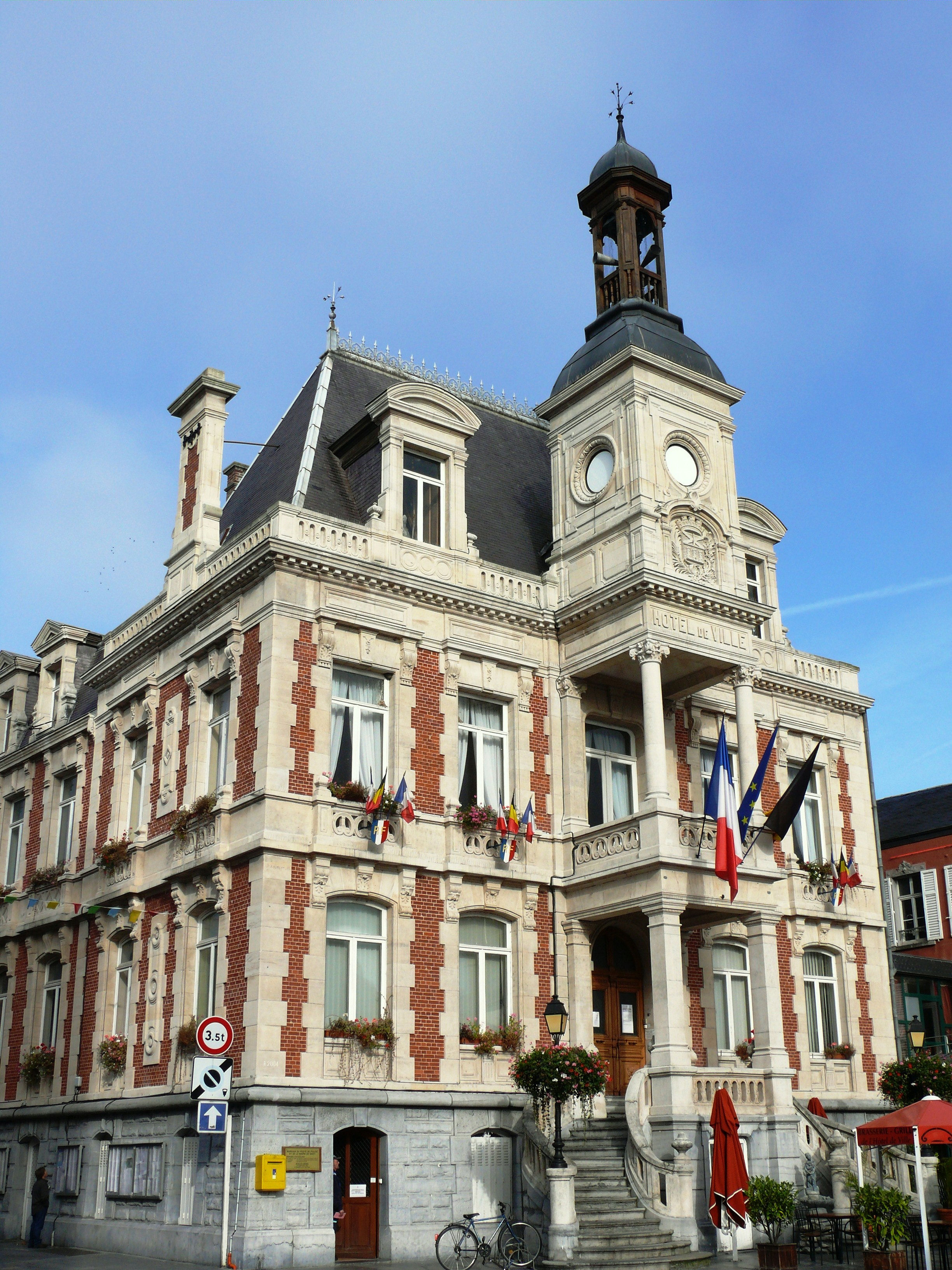
The Hotel de Ville in Givet, a border town with Belgium.

Under the intercommunality framework, Ardennes consists of an urban community organized around the city préfecture, called Heart of Ardennes and has fifteen communities of communes including in Sedan the Communauté de communes du Pays sedanais which is the most important.

In addition, the Ardennes has 33 communes that do not adhere to any Intercommunal cooperative organisation (EPCI).

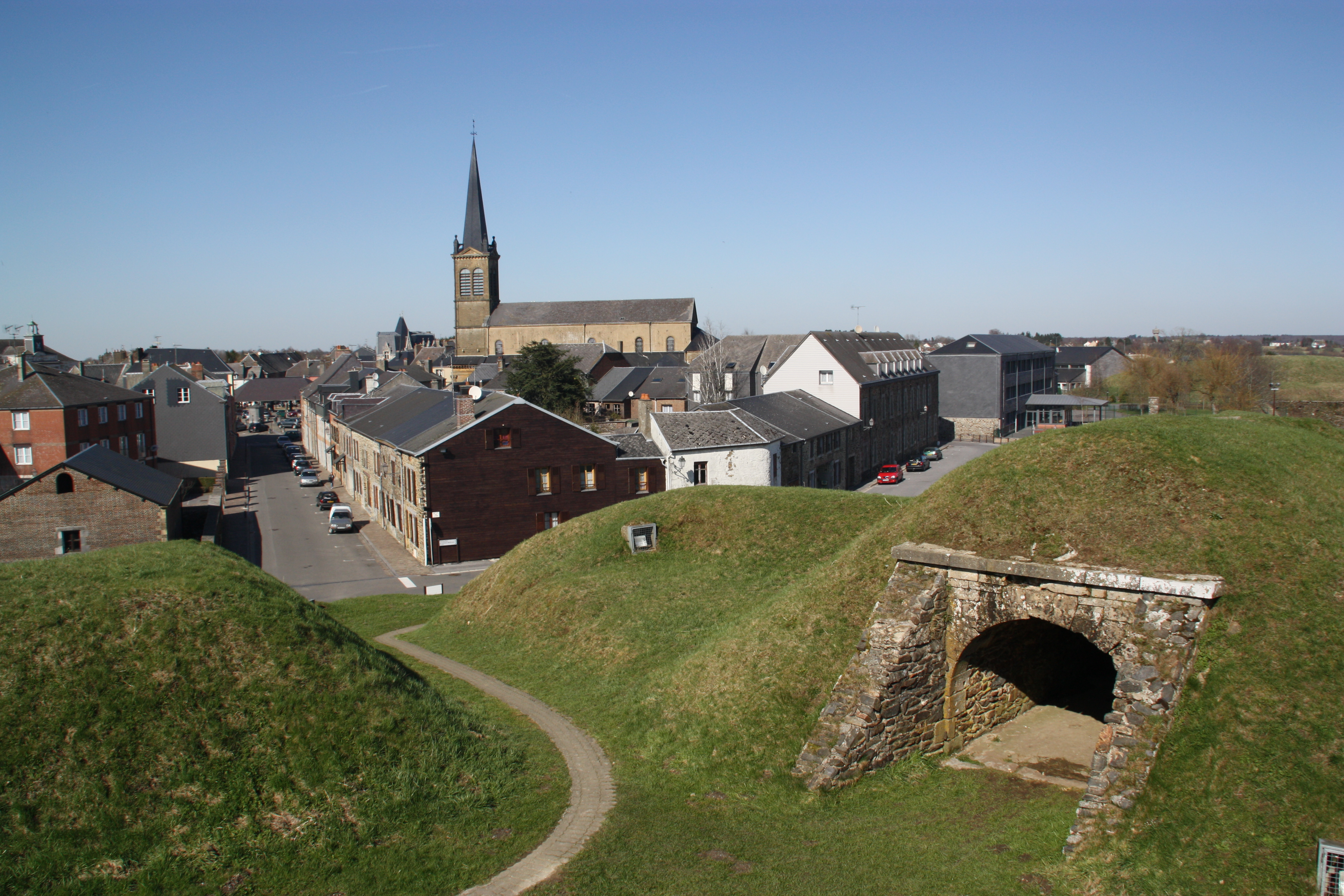
The small town of Rocroi was a sub-prefecture of Ardennes until 1926.

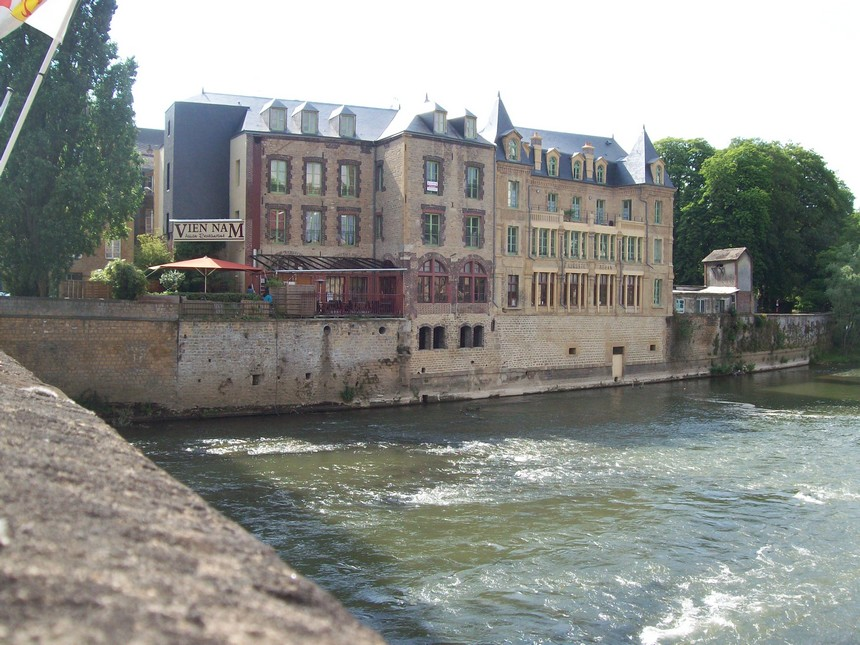
La Meuse at Sedan, sub-préfecture and second city of Ardennes.

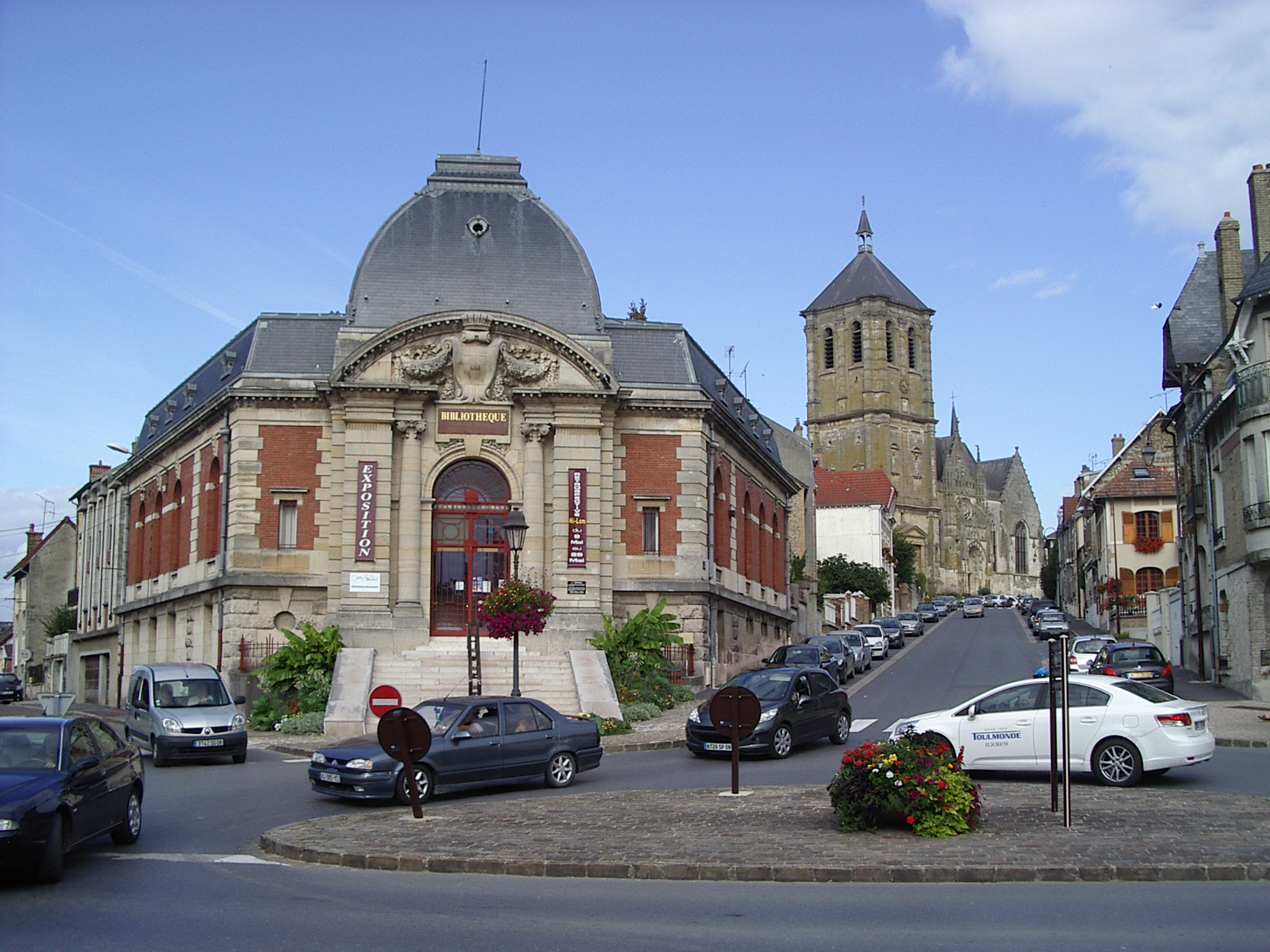
Rethel, sub-préfecture of Ardennes and third city of the department.

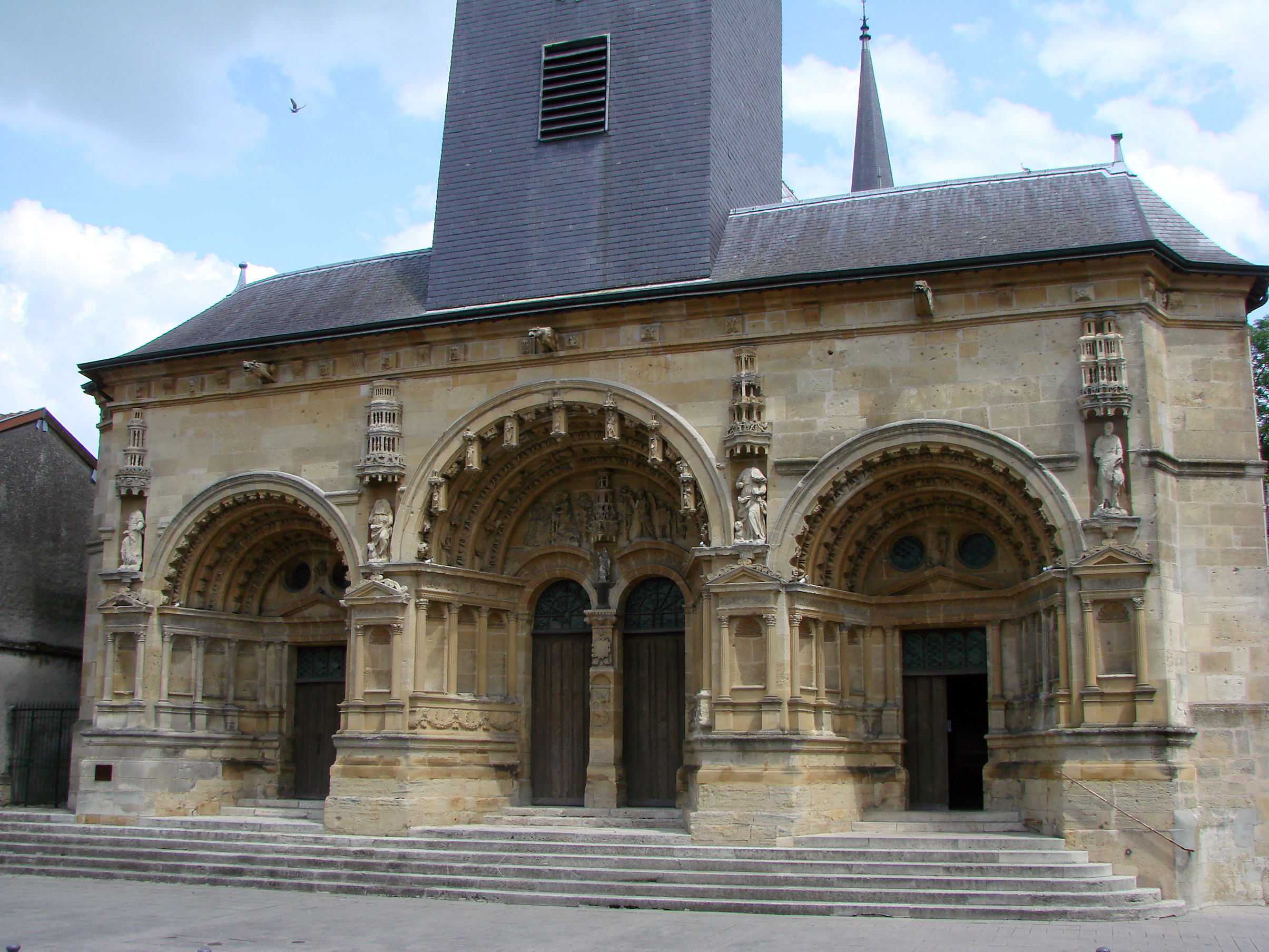
Vouziers, the smallest sub-préfecture of the Ardennes department.

=== List of territorial collectives ===
- List of the 452 communes of the department
- List of cantons of Ardennes
- Arrondissement of Charleville-Mézières
- Arrondissement of Rethel
- Arrondissement of Sedan
- Arrondissement of Vouziers

== Politics ==
The President of the Departmental Council is Noël Bourgeois of The Republicans.

=== Current National Assembly Representatives ===
| Constituency | Member | Party |
|---|---|---|
| Ardennes's 1st constituency | Lionel Vuibert | Independent |
| Ardennes's 2nd constituency | Pierre Cordier | The Republicans |
| Ardennes's 3rd constituency | Jean-Luc Warsmann | Miscellaneous right |

=== Presidential elections 2nd round ===
| Election | Winning candidate | Party | % | 2nd place candidate | Party | % |
|---|---|---|---|---|---|---|
| 2022 | Emmanuel Macron | LREM | 43.34 | Marine Le Pen | RN | 56.66 |
| 2017 | Emmanuel Macron | LREM | 50.73 | Marine Le Pen | FN | 49.27 |
| 2012 | François Hollande | PS | 51.89 | Nicolas Sarkozy | UMP | 48.11 |
| 2007 | Nicolas Sarkozy | UMP | 53.53 | Ségolène Royal | PS | 46.47 |
| 2002 | Jacques Chirac | RPR | 75.92 | Jean-Marie Le Pen | FN | 24.08 |
| 1995 | Lionel Jospin | PS | 53.29 | Jacques Chirac | RPR | 46.71 |

== Economy ==
The economy of the department, after previously resting on agriculture (forestry and livestock – crops are poor), has been based for over a century now on industry (now in a difficult position) and the services sector, although the proportion of the Ardennes labour force working in this sector is lower than the national average. At the beginning of the 19th century, the region was the largest in France for metal working using charcoal. There was no coal found in the department (only slate from Fumay was usable) but the metallurgical industry developed there (bolts, screws, nails). The railway with many branches (Compagnie des chemins de fer des Ardennes from the Sellière family which merged with the Compagnie de l'Est) accelerated the industrialization at the end of the 19th century in Charleville, Sedan (which had its trams), and Revin. The newspaper L'Usine ardennaise (The Ardennes Factory) became L'Usine nouvelle (The New Factory). The crisis in the 1970s precipitated the decline of metallurgical activity in the department (the blast furnace and small workshops closed one after the other: Blagny, Vireux-Molhain, Murtin-et-Bogny, etc.). Today there are still many subcontractors for the railway industry (TGV for example) and the car industry (GMC, PSA Peugeot Citroën, Mercedes-Benz, among others), Hermès has recently installed themselves at Murtin-et-Bogny, PSA Peugeot Citroën is installed at Les Ayvelles. There is also a nuclear site – the Chooz Nuclear Power Plant with several reactors including the first pressurized water reactor (REP) in France. Agriculture has grown considerably using industrial techniques (wheat, maize, sugar beet).

There are direct TGV trains from the Gare de l'Est in Paris to Charleville-Mézières (1h 35 m), Sedan, and several TGV trains to Reims with a change for Charleville-Mézières.

A "Y" road has also been set up with the A4 Reims-Paris, the A34 (freeway), and the links to Lille and Brussels which need to take the N5 to join the motorway ring of Charleroi. Similarly, the junction with the highway leading to Luxembourg and Cologne needs to use a portion of highway in France. Improved means of land communication (TGV and A34 motorway) provides the benefit of relative proximity to Paris, Reims, Metz and Belgian cities such as Liège, Charleroi and Brussels.

Every year in September, the Sedan fair is a big shopping event (2nd in the region) which attracts about 250,000 people each year.

== Tourism ==
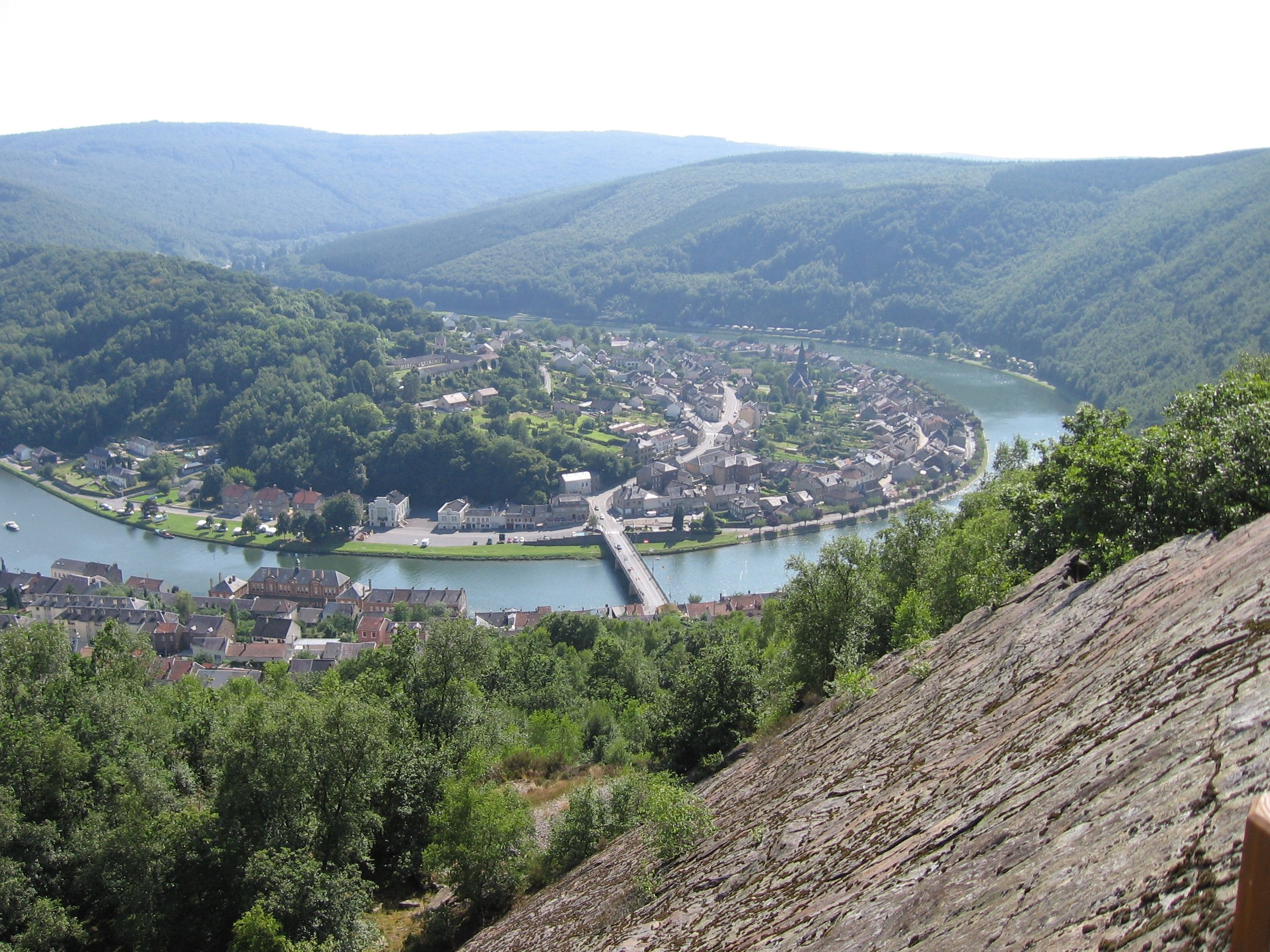
Monthermé along the Meuse

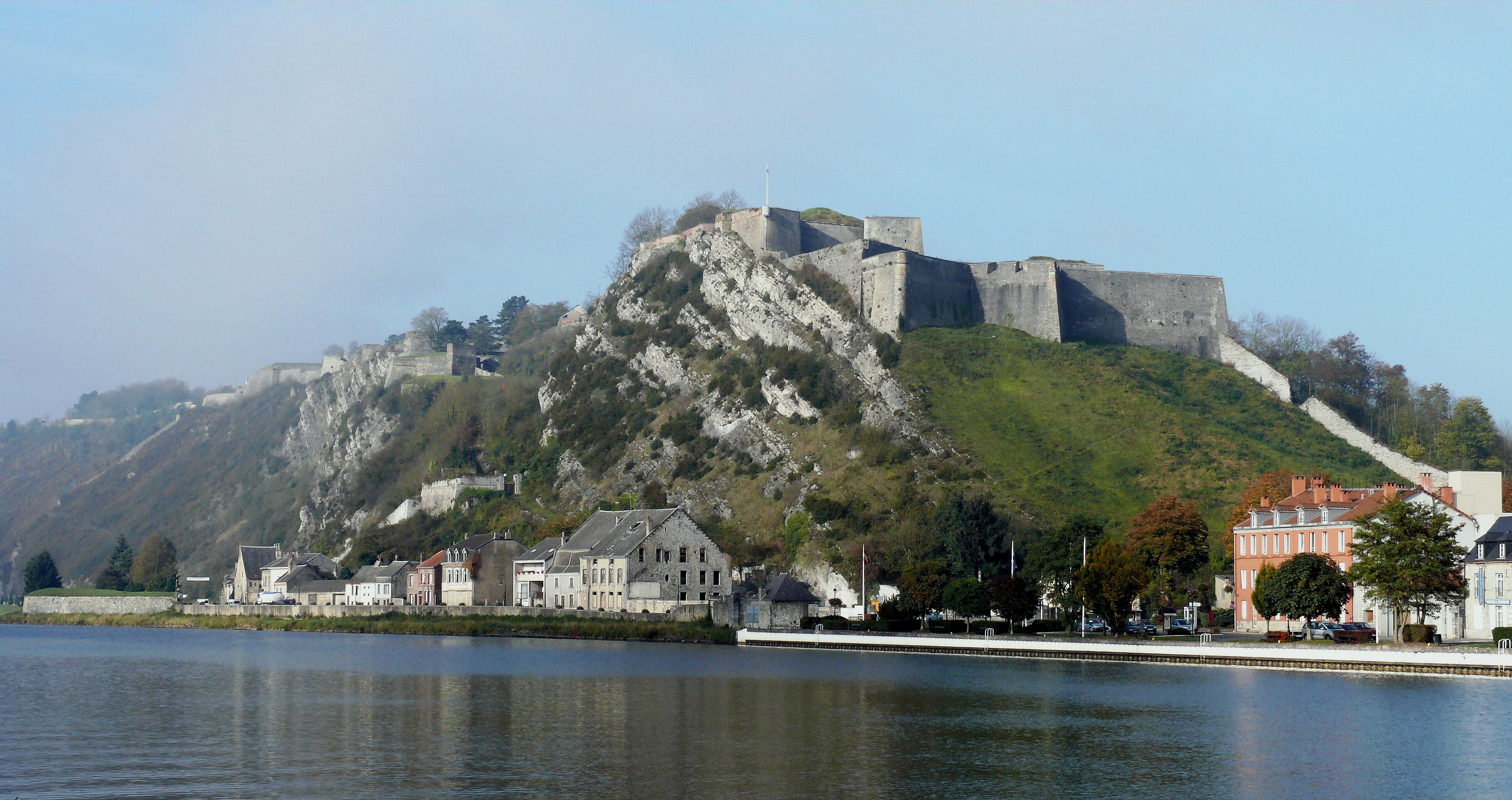
Fort de Charlemont in Givet

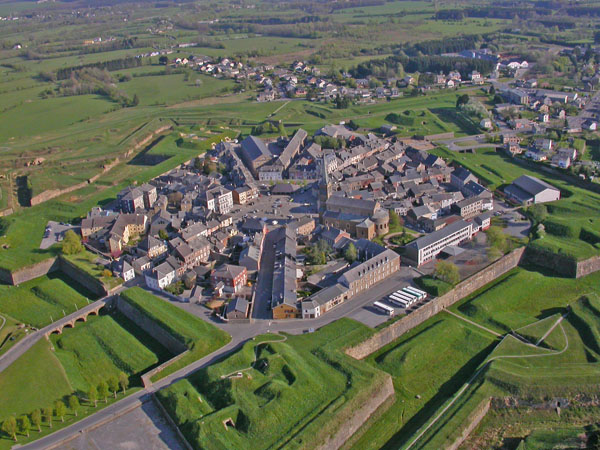
The citadel of Rocroi

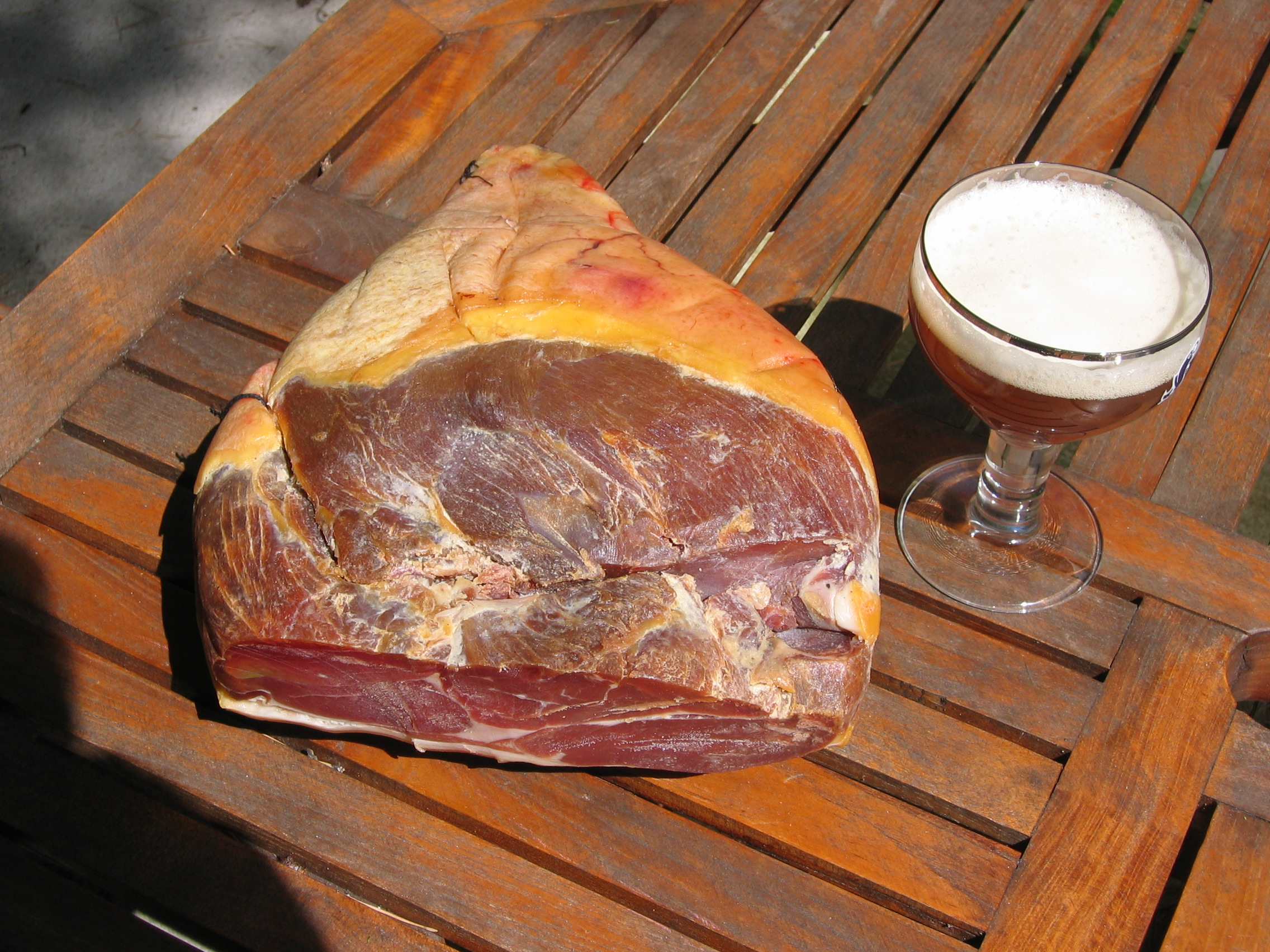
Dry-cured ham from Ardennes

In the department there are iconic landmarks that attract many visitors each year, such as the Château de Sedan (the busiest paying attraction in the Ardennes, with an average of 60,000 admissions per year), the fortified site of Charlemont at Givet, the fort at Les Ayvelles, and the fortress of Rocroi. There are also many fortified churches and medieval sites in the department. (Note: See the article:The Discovery of Medieval sites of North Argonne, Daniel HOCHEDEZ in the review HORIZONS D'ARGONNE, No. 88, June 2011, pp. 7–14 (publication of the Centre for Studies of Argonne) (in French)) There is the Ardennes forest, the "Green Way" (a bicycle path connecting Montcy-Notre Dame near Charleville-Mézières to Givet along the Meuse valley) promoting weekend tourism and tourist routes (green tourism).

Cultural tourism is booming with many music festivals (Le Cabaret Vert, the Douzy'k festival, the Aymon Folk Festival) not to mention museums (such as the Museum of the Ardennes) and castles and the growing interest in industrial heritage.

Finally, the creation of the Natural Regional Park of Ardennes (Regional Natural Park of Ardennes) on 21 December 2011 should continue to increase this type of tourism.

=== Second homes ===
Home purchases by Belgians and Dutch people are common in the region because the prices are much lower than in their countries of residence. However, as of 2020, 3.5% of available housing in the department are second homes which is rather low.

== Culture ==
=== Festivals ===
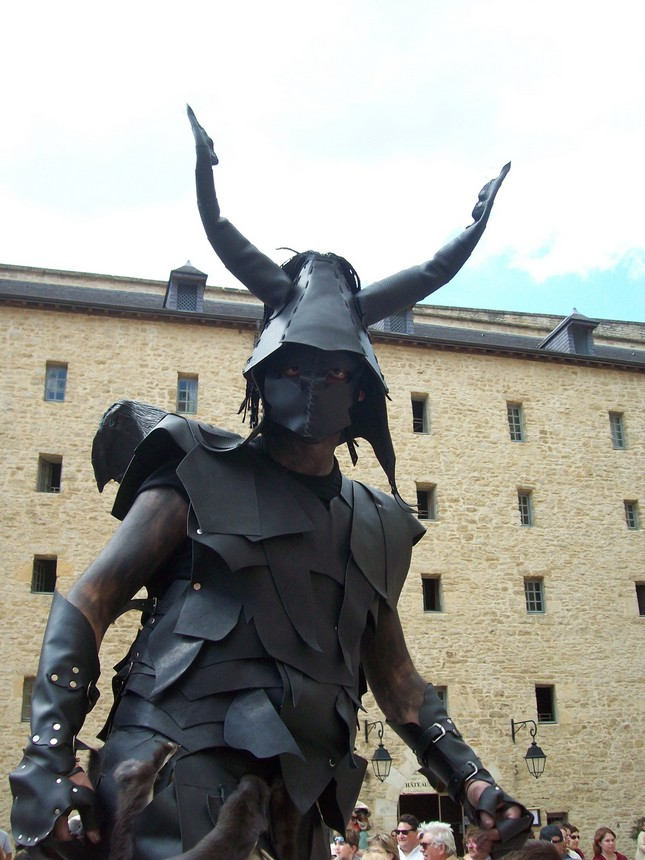
Medieval Festival in 2011

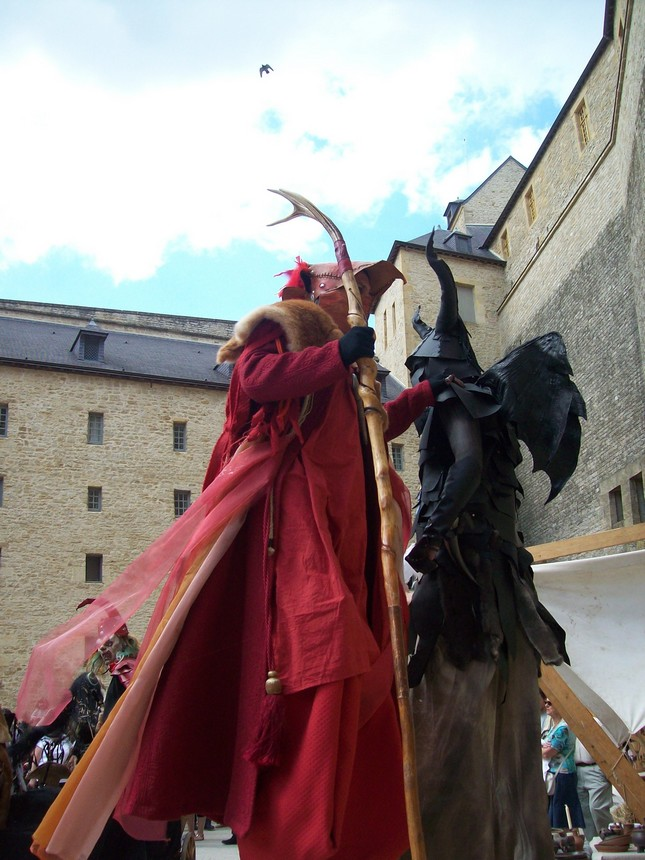
Medieval Festival in 2011

For more than 40 years (the first time in 1961 at the initiative of Jacques Félix) there has been in Charleville-Mézières the World Festival of Puppet Theatre (now every three years). At the last festival in 2009 more than 200,000 people were present. In the same city there is also a school: the International Institute of Puppetry. The Rock Festival and Territory Le Cabaret Vert had more than 50,000 festival-goers at the seventh festival in 2011 and this takes place every year in Charleville-Mézières making it the 7th largest festival in France by attendance. The festival The Poetic Otherworld organizes events in October in some Ardennes communes.

At Sedan the medieval festival is held every year around the Castle of Sedan, the largest castle in Europe. This is an event that brings together more than 30,000 spectators.

At Rethel there are the famous festivals of Saint Anne which have been held for over 200 years.

At Bogny-sur-Meuse there is the Aymon Folk Festival which brings together nearly 10,000 people.

The Ardennes also has other well-known festivals such as the Festimeuse which attracts 10,000 people, the festival of Cassine with 7,000 people at the 3rd festival in 2010.

The metal festival of Vouziers attracts about 2000 people. The Rock festival in El Mont at Aiglemont hosted more than 2,000 people in 2010. Lastly there is at Douzy every July and every second year the Douzy'k Festival which brings between 5,000 and 7,000 people each time.

The Argonne does not have only two musical events. For 14 years, the village of Louvergny has staged a lyrical festival called Encounters of Louvergny in early August as the heart of the Argonne campaign, with singers from different countries. More recently Notes of Argonne propose to cross the Argonne mountains with concerts of classical music with regional and national performers. The May 2008 festival included Patrice Fontanarosa and his wife Marielle Nordmann. Both events had an immediate success in the region and the public has not stopped coming since.

=== Tales and legends ===
For a long time the region was a land of legends with its rocks, rivers, lakes, and thick dark forests: for example The Four Sons of Aymon, knights on their horse called Bayard helped by the enchanter Maugis who gave his name to village of Noyers-Pont-Maugis at the time of Charlemagne.

=== Literature ===
The play by William Shakespeare, "As you Like It" (1599), is set in the Forest of Arden, an imagined hybrid of the Ardennes and the Arden woods near his birthplace of Stratford-upon-Avon, England.

The novel by Yves Gibeau, Les gros sous (The big money) (1953) takes place in the south-west of the department.

The Ardennes serves as the backdrop to the novel by Julien Gracq, A Balcony in the Forest (Un balcon en forêt), published in 1958 and for which Michel Mitrani made a film in 1979 with Jacques Villeret. This novel/story is based on the experience as a soldier by the author at the beginning of the Second World War.

The region serves as a backdrop for the Ardennes writer André Dhôtel (1900–1991), especially in Le Pays où l'on n’arrive jamais (The country where one never arrives).

=== Cinema ===
The department has a varied natural environment (the Meuse valley, the border between Belgium and France, the Ardennes plateau, forests, etc.) which attracts filmmakers and television which first began in the late 1960s and in the 1970s.

- Le Train (The Train) (1973) with Jean-Louis Trintignant and Romy Schneider was partly filmed in the valley of the Meuse
- Maigret chez les Flamands (Maigret and the Flemes) (1976), a novel by Georges Simenon who knew the area nearby (Liège). Since then he travelled a lot and located the action at Givet (the TV movie with Jean Richard was shot here).
- The film by Claude Autant-Lara, Les Patates (The Potatoes), produced in 1969 with Pierre Perret, was shot entirely in Bourg-Fidèle, a village on the plateau of Rocroi.
- In 2006, Les Enfants du Pays (The children of the country) by Pierre Javaux with Michel Serrault was located in a small village lost in the Ardennes Forest in May 1940 when five Senegalese Tirailleurs are isolated from their regiment and lost, meet an old man and his two small children left alone after the exodus of the population.
- In 2007, Marcel Trillat made Silence dans la vallée (Silence in the valley), a documentary about the liquidation of the ironworks at Nouzonville, the Ateliers Thomé-Génot (workshops Thomé-Génot) by American buyers who empty the cash for themselves. Cellatex suffered the same fate at Givet in 2000.

== Notable people linked to the department ==
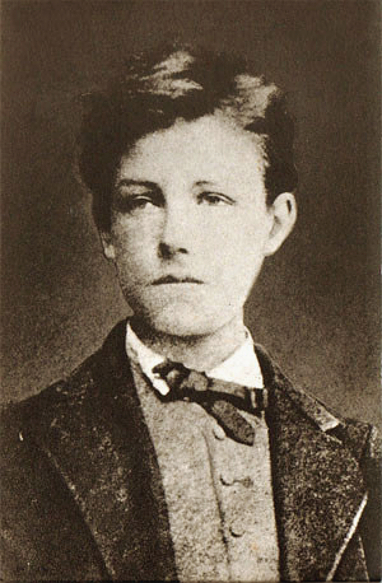
Arthur Rimbaud was a native of Charleville-Mézières.

- Albert Caquot, polytechnic and academician, built many structures and made other inventions especially in aeronautics.
- Alfred Chanzy, General
- Jean-Nicolas Corvisart (1755–1821), famous doctor and scientist, was born in Dricourt, near Vouziers
- René Daumal, writer, born on 16 March 1908 and died on 21 May 1944
- Turenne (1611–1675), Marshal of France, was born in Sedan;
- Nicolas Louis de Lacaille, Abbot of La Caille, astronomer and cartographer in the 18th century
- Guillaume de Machaut (1284–1370), poet/composer and author of Le Voir Dit, was born in Machault;
- Boucher de Perthes, prehistorian
- Robert de Sorbon (1201–1274), who created in Paris the Sorbonne, the famous French university, was born in the village of Sorbon, near Rethel
- Robert Debré was born in Sedan, the founder of the French university-hospital system and modern pediatrics
- Alexandre-François Desportes, painter
- André Dhôtel, writer (Attigny)
- The Hachette family with Louis-François Christophe founded the famous publishing house
- Felix LaBauve (1809–1879), French-born American early settler and community leader in the state of Mississippi
- Dom Mabillon founded modern historical criticism in the 17th century
- Yannick Noah was born in Sedan on 18 May 1960. His father, Zacharie Noah, was defender at the UA Sedan-Torcy with whom he won the Coupe de France in 1961
- Christian Poncelet, the former president of the Senate, born in Blaise in 1928
- Arthur Rimbaud (1854–1891), one of the most famous poets from France, was born in Charleville
- Hippolyte Taine (1828–1893), philosopher and historian, member of the Académie française, was born in Vouziers and contributed to the progress of positivism particularly in the field of history

=== Local press ===
Regional newspapers are: L'Ardennais (from Charleville-Mézières) and L'Union. They now have shared writing – only the first page differs. Since 2009, a weekly newspaper has been published in the Ardennes: La Semaine des Ardennes. Printed in Charleville-Mézières, over 2000 copies are printed.

== See also ==
- Arrondissements of the Ardennes department
- Communes of the Ardennes department
