= Bogny =

Bogny is part of the name of several communes in the Ardennes département of northern France:

- Bogny-sur-Meuse
- Logny-Bogny
- Murtin-et-Bogny
