= Logny =

Logny may refer to:

France

- Logny-Bogny, commune in the Ardennes department
- Logny-lès-Aubenton, commune in the Aisne department
- Logny-lès-Chaumont, former commune in the Ardennes department, now part of Chaumont-Porcien
