= List of protected heritage sites in Gedinne =

This table shows an overview of the protected heritage sites in the Walloon town Gedinne. This list is part of Belgium's national heritage.

Object	Year/architect	Town/section	Address	Coordinates	Number^{?}	Image
Petite Fagne on the plateau of the Croix-Scaille ^{(nl)} ^{(fr)}		Gedinne		49.953278°N 4.845508°E	91054-CLT-0001-01 Info	
Rural building referred to as "le Château" ^{(nl)} ^{(fr)}		Gedinne	rue L. Demars 1, Rienne	49.993207°N 4.889011°E	91054-CLT-0004-01 Info	Plattelandsgebouw met de naam "le Château"
Ensemble of the watermill and its surroundings ^{(nl)} ^{(fr)}		Gedinne	Louette-Saint-Denis	49.962839°N 4.952291°E	91054-CLT-0005-01 Info	

== See also ==
- List of protected heritage sites in Namur (province)
