= Willerzie =

Village in Gedinne, Belgium

Coordinates: 49.986994°N 4.84791°E

Willerzie (Walloon: Vierziye) is a village of Wallonia and a district of the municipality of Gedinne, located in the province of Namur, Belgium.

Location of Willerzie in the municipality of Gedinne

== Gallery ==
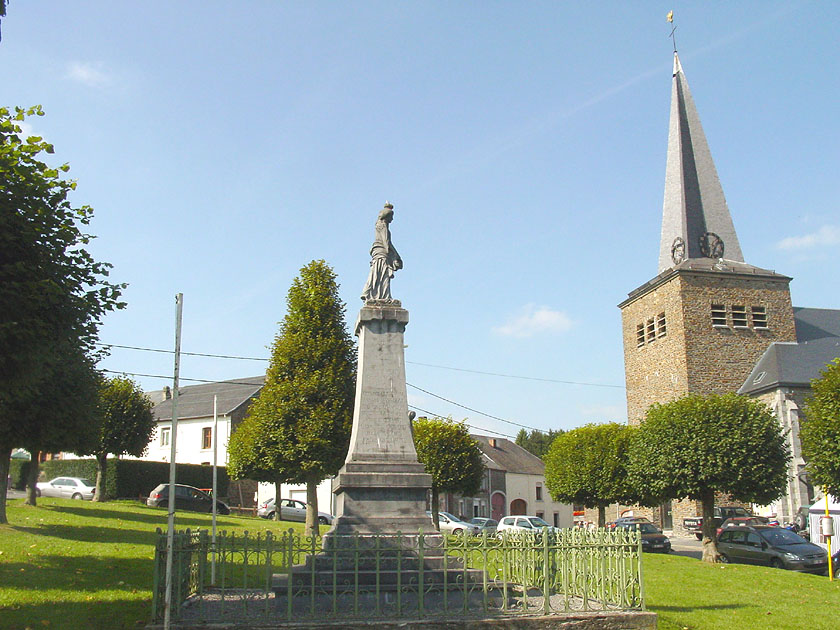
The village green and church of Willerzie

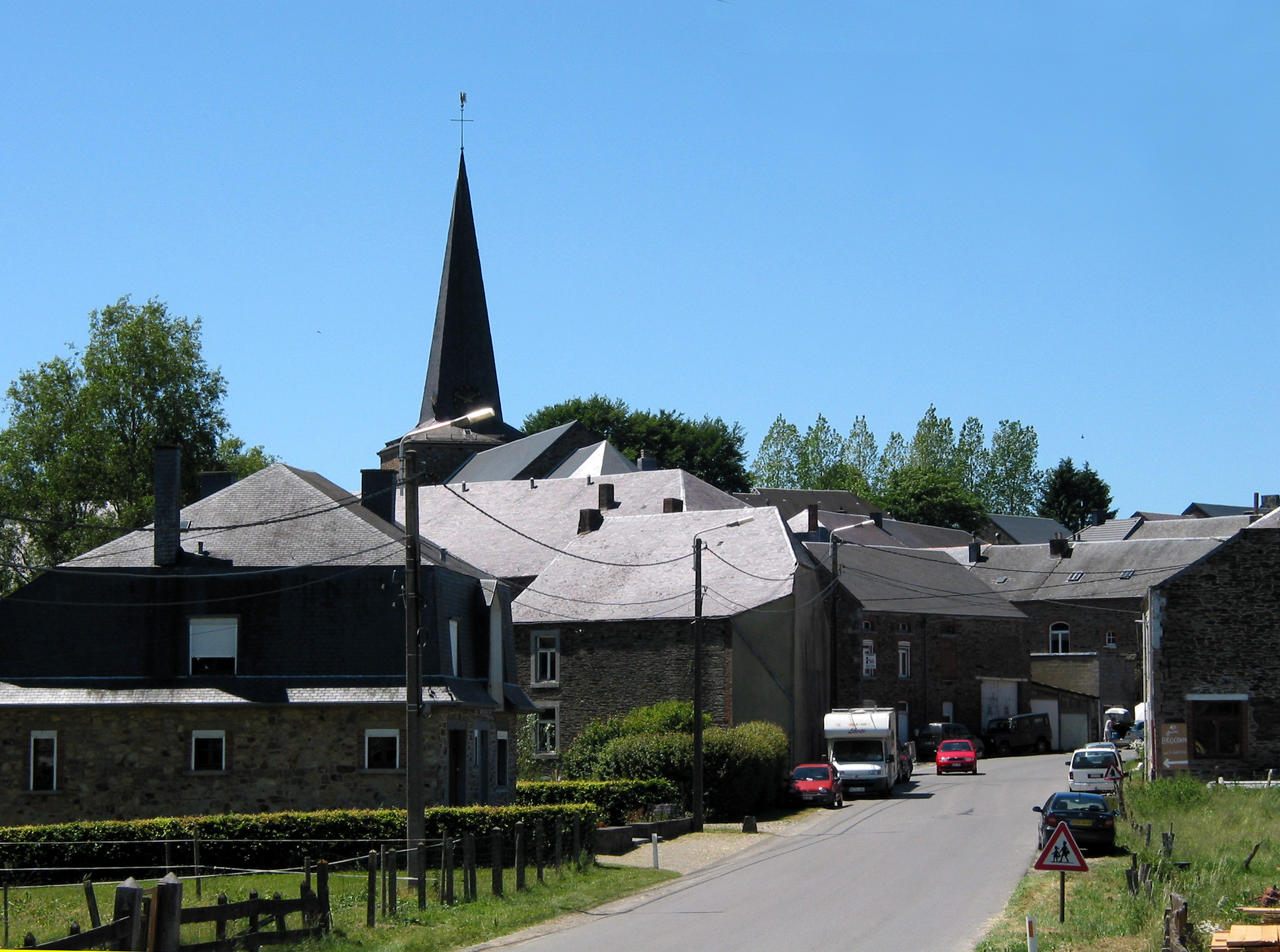
The centre of Willerzie
