= Croix Scaille =

Plateau in Wallonia, Belgium

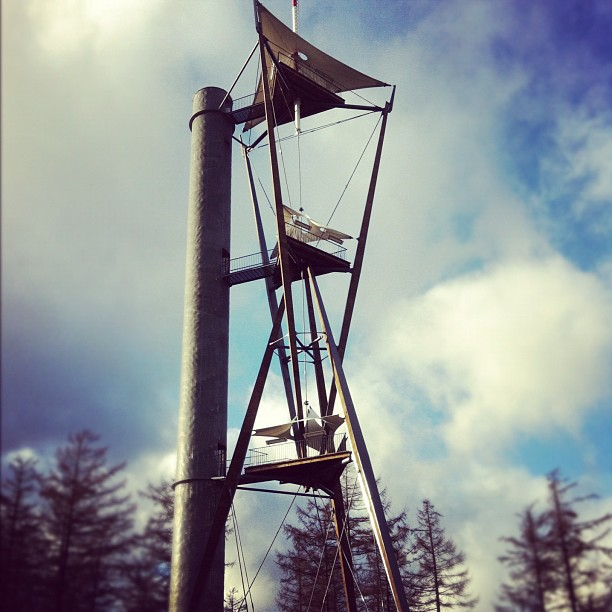
- The Tour du Millénaire (2012)

Highest point
- Elevation: 504 m (1,654 ft)
- Coordinates: 49°57′03″N 4°50′44″E

Geography
- Location within Belgium
- Location: Province of Namur, Wallonia, Belgium
- Parent range: Ardennes

The Croix Scaille is the plateau of a forested massif in the Ardennes, in Wallonia, bounded to the north by the valley of the Semois and to the east by the Meuse. It is the highest point of the southern Ardennes, with a height of 504 metres above sea level and is located exactly on the Franco-Belgian border on the edge of the French département of Ardennes (commune of Hautes-Rivières), and the Belgian province of Namur (Gedinne commune).

The wooded plateau is covered by the bois de Saint-Jean on the Belgian side, named after the stream that crosses the border from south to north, and by the bois des Haies on the French side, probably taking its name from the beech trees (French: hêtres) which are one of the dominant species here together with oak and spruce.

During the Second World War, the wooded area of Croix Scaille was a hotbed of maquis resistance in the Ardennes.

The Tour du Millénaire, which was erected in 2001, has 243 steps and enables a panoramic view of the Belgian and French Ardennes. The original wooden structure rotted and was dismantled in 2008 before being rebuilt in metal in 2012.
