= Tour du Millénaire =

Tower and vantage point in Belgium

Coordinates: 49.950889°N 4.845228°E

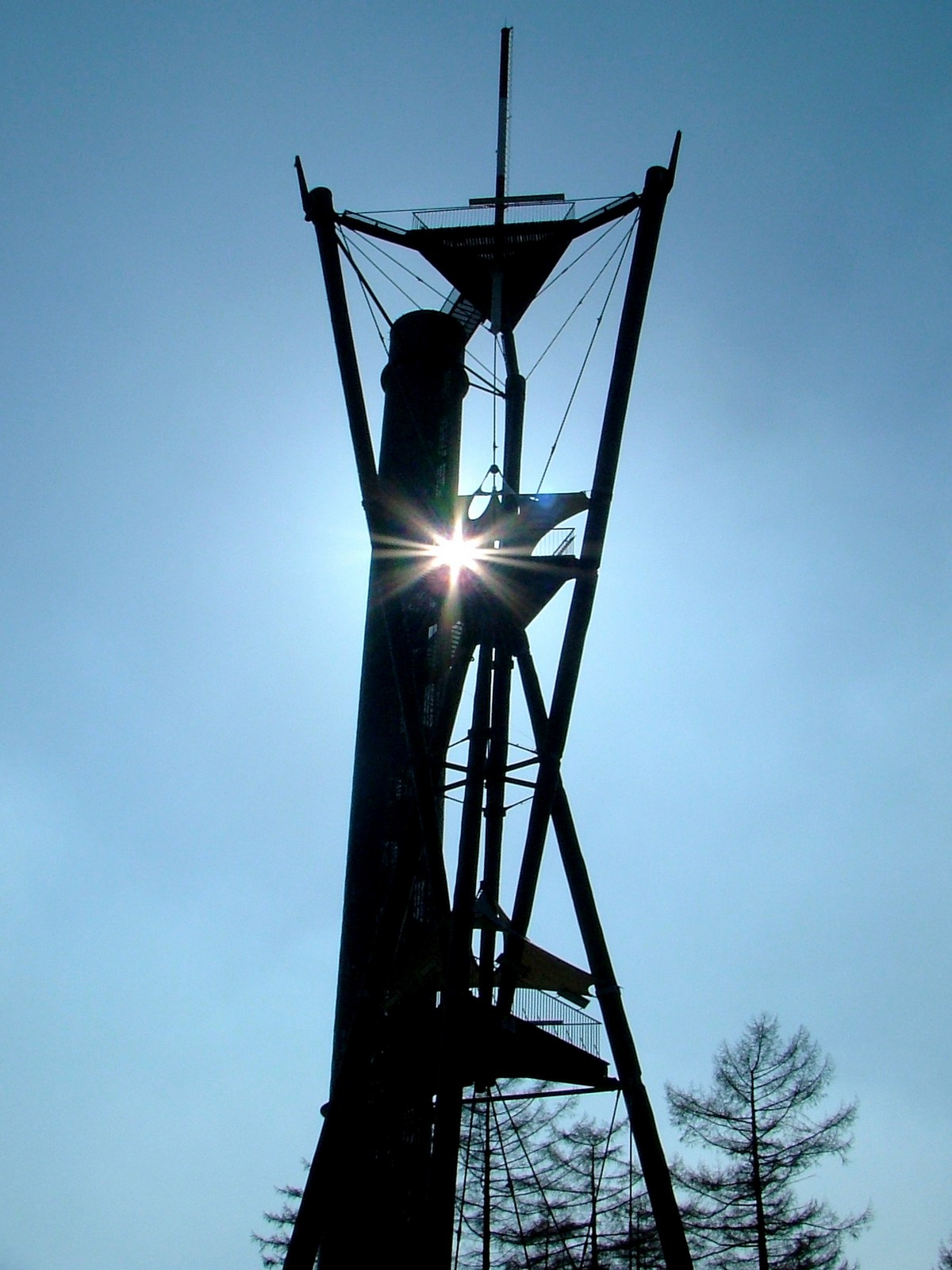
The Tour du Millénaire, or Tour de Gedinne (2006)

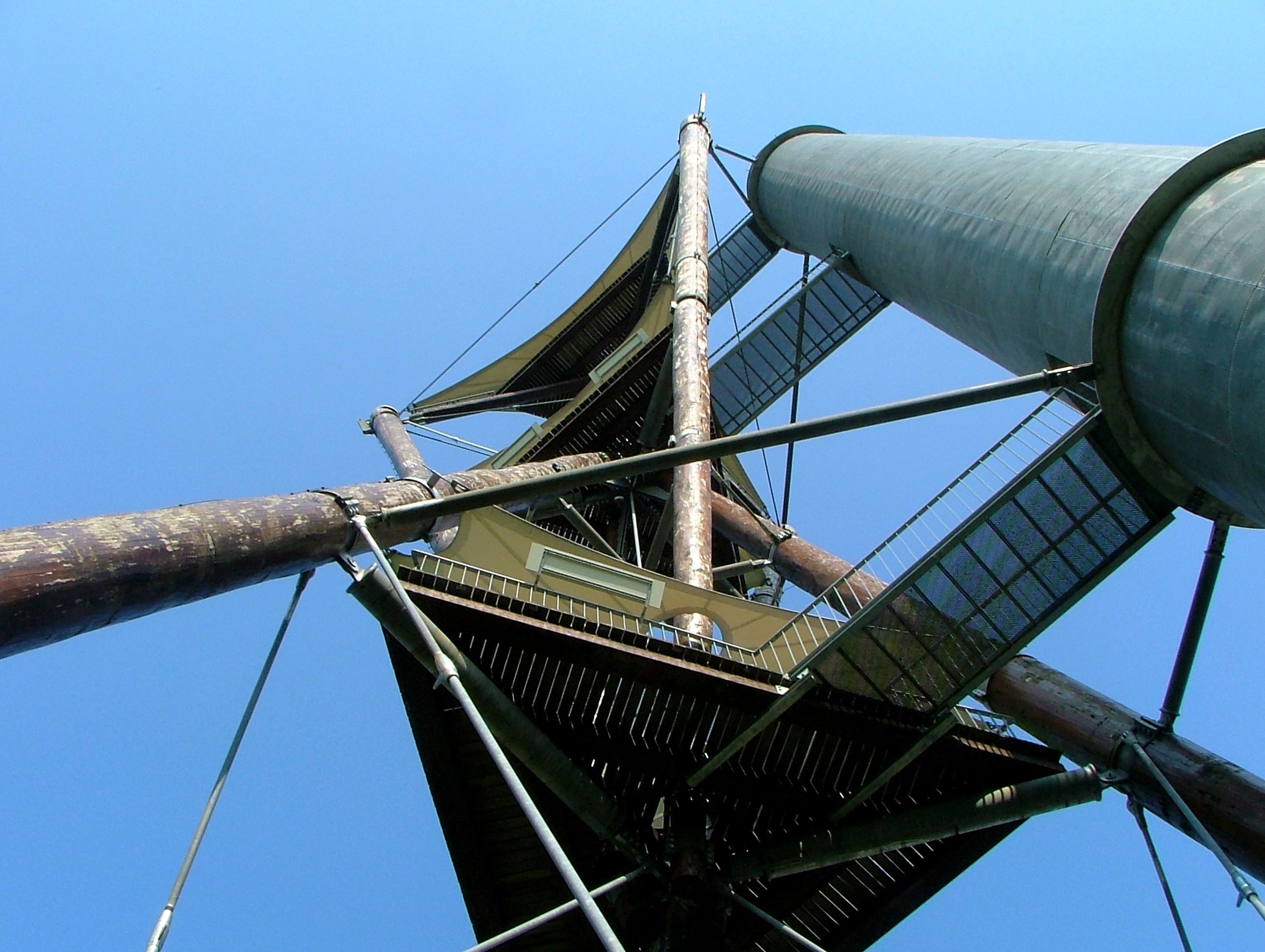
The Tour du Millénaire, or Tour de Gedinne (2004)

The tour du millénaire (French for tower of the millennium) is a vantage point built in 2001 in Gedinne, Belgium just meters away from the French border.

The tower consists of two tripods fitted together (one upright, one upside down) with three different viewing platforms (at 15 m, 30 m and 45 m). The total height of the tower (including the spire) is 60 m. The legs of the tripods are the stems of Douglas-fir trees found in the surrounding forest, held together by a steel construction.

It tops the plateau of the Croix-Scaille, a forest of around 90 square kilometres that was used by the Resistance during World War II. The plateau is at 503 m the highest point in the Ardennes (excluding the High Fens which is sometimes defined as being in the Ardennes) and the fourth highest summit in Belgium.

The tower was dismantled due to wood rot on 7 July 2008, and reopened after restoration on 5 July 2012.
