= Arrondissements of the Ardennes department =

Administrative divisions of Ardennes, France

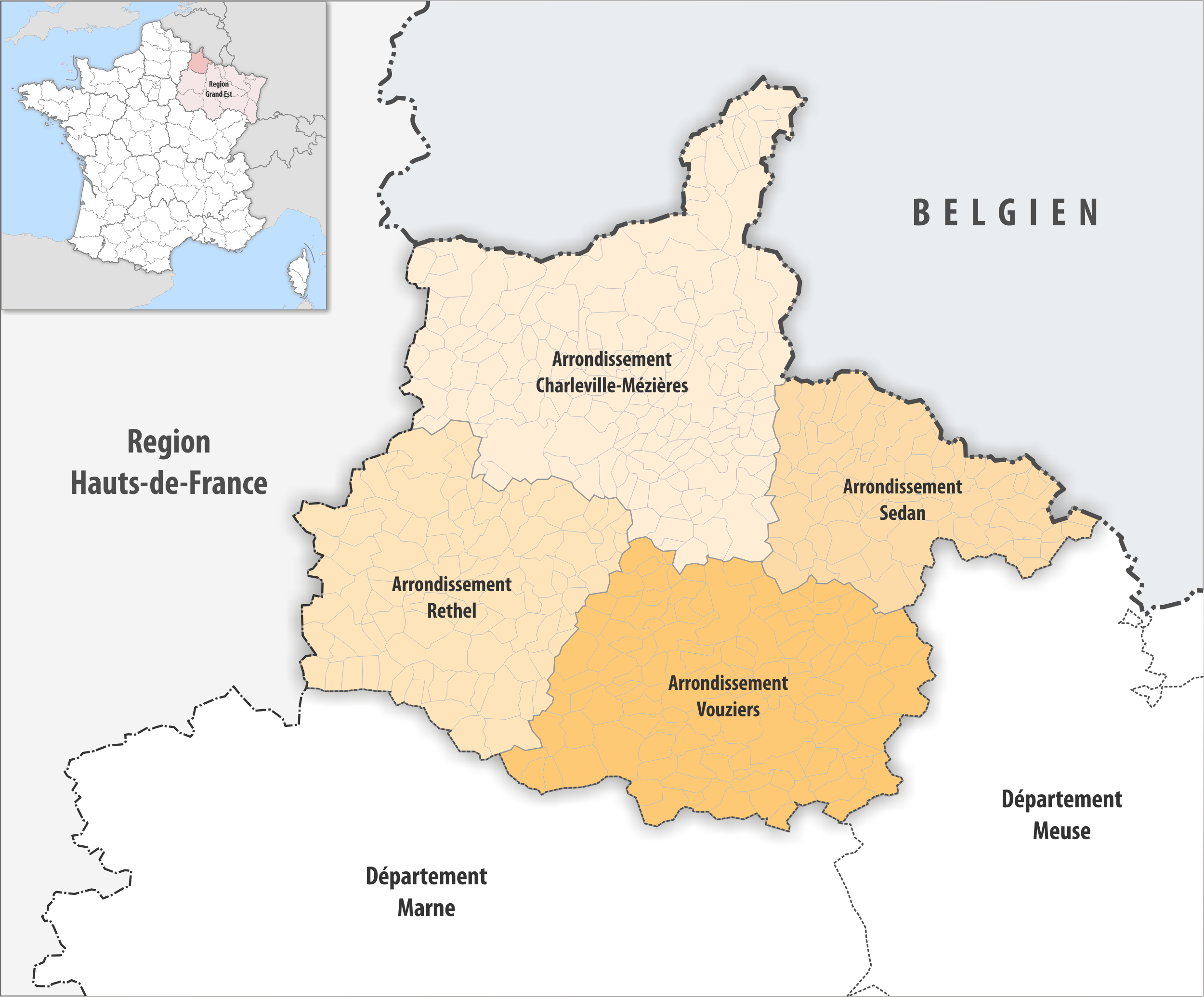
Map of arrondissements of the Ardennes department.

The 4 arrondissements of the Ardennes department are:

1. Arrondissement of Charleville-Mézières, (prefecture of the Ardennes department: Charleville-Mézières) with 157 communes. The population of the arrondissement was 153,985 in 2021.
2. Arrondissement of Rethel, (subprefecture: Rethel) with 101 communes. The population of the arrondissement was 37,339 in 2021.
3. Arrondissement of Sedan, (subprefecture: Sedan) with 72 communes. The population of the arrondissement was 56,483 in 2021.
4. Arrondissement of Vouziers, (subprefecture: Vouziers) with 118 communes. The population of the arrondissement was 21,052 in 2021.

== History ==
In 1800 the arrondissements of Mézières, Rethel, Rocroi, Sedan and Vouziers were established. The arrondissements of Rocroi and Sedan were disbanded in 1926. The arrondissement of Sedan was restored in 1942.
