= Logny-Bogny =

- Commune
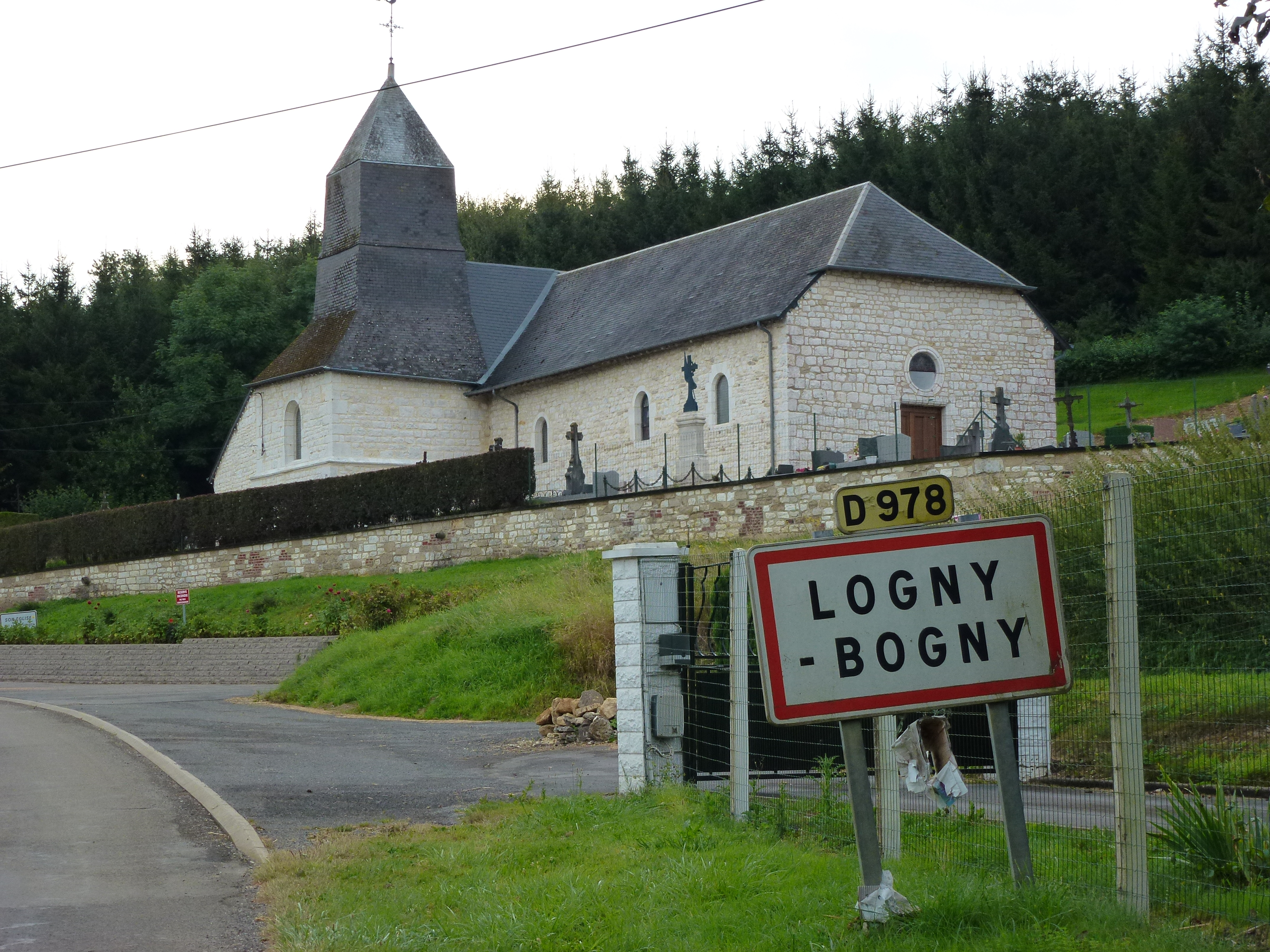
- The church in Logny-Bogny
- Location of Logny-Bogny
- Location within France Location within Grand Est
- Coordinates: 49°46′42″N 4°23′51″E
- Country: France
- Region: Grand Est
- Department: Ardennes
- Arrondissement: Charleville-Mézières
- Canton: Signy-l'Abbaye

Government
  - Mayor (2020–2026): Anne Toury
- Area^{1}: 10.66 km^{2} (4.12 sq mi)
- Elevation: 208 m (682 ft)
- Population (2023): 152
  - Density: 14.3/km^{2} (36.9/sq mi)
- Time zone: UTC+01:00 (CET)
  - Summer (DST): UTC+02:00 (CEST)
- INSEE/Postal code: 08257 /08150
- ^{1} French Land Register data, which excludes lakes, ponds, glaciers > 1 km^{2} (0.386 sq mi or 247 acres) and river estuaries.

Logny-Bogny is a commune in the Ardennes department in northern France.

== Population ==
Historical population
Year	Pop.	±% p.a.
1968	154	—
1975	144	−0.95%
1982	153	+0.87%
1990	157	+0.32%
1999	143	−1.03%
2007	178	+2.77%
2012	192	+1.53%
2017	168	−2.64%
2023	152	−1.65%
Source: INSEE

== See also ==
- Communes of the Ardennes department
