= Murtin-et-Bogny =

- Commune
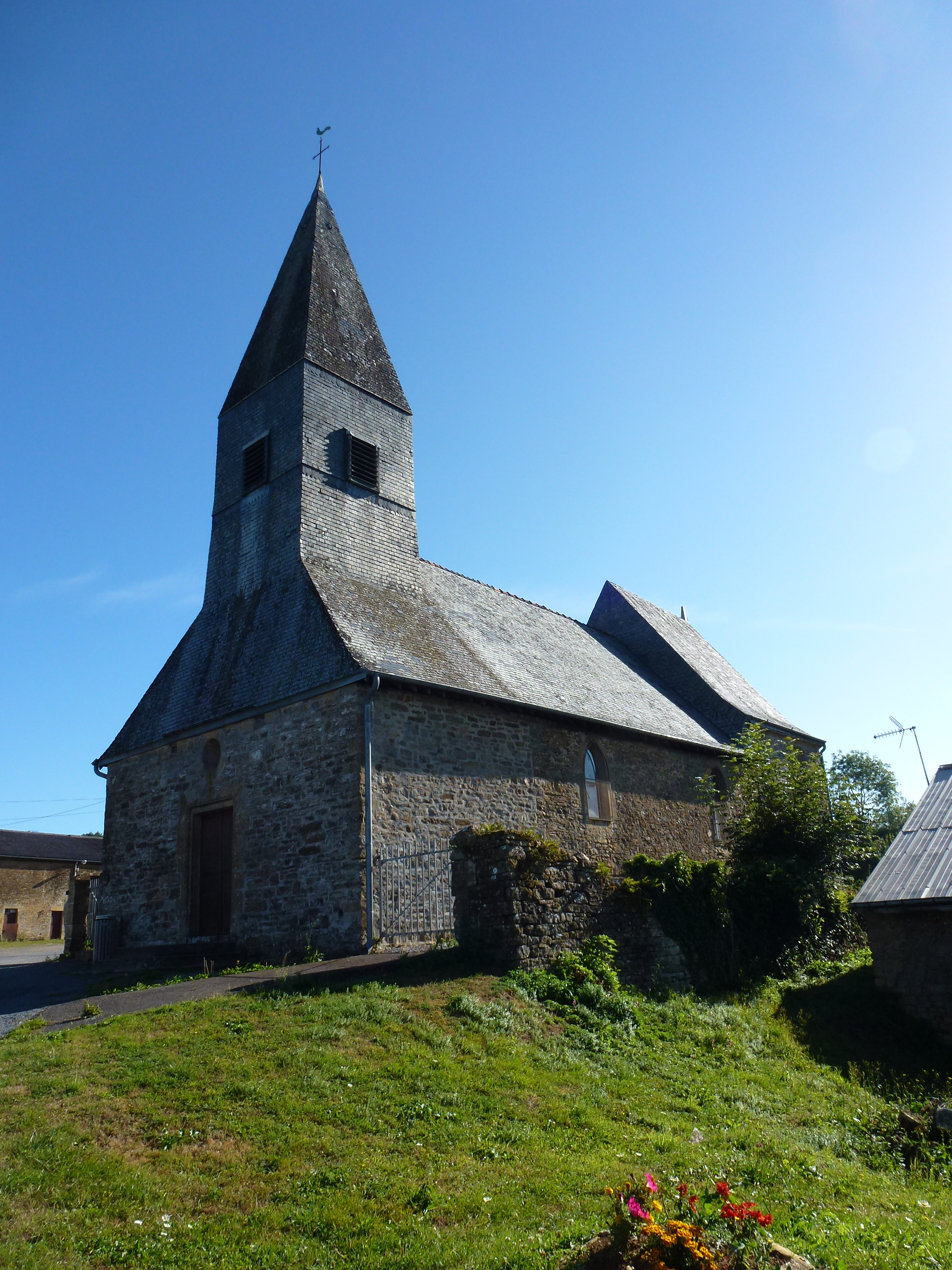
- The church in Bogny
- Location of Murtin-et-Bogny
- Location within France Location within Grand Est
- Coordinates: 49°49′04″N 4°32′18″E
- Country: France
- Region: Grand Est
- Department: Ardennes
- Arrondissement: Charleville-Mézières
- Canton: Rocroi

Government
  - Mayor (2020–2026): Catherine Bouillon
- Area^{1}: 7.11 km^{2} (2.75 sq mi)
- Elevation: 190 m (620 ft)
- Population (2023): 168
  - Density: 23.6/km^{2} (61.2/sq mi)
- Time zone: UTC+01:00 (CET)
  - Summer (DST): UTC+02:00 (CEST)
- INSEE/Postal code: 08312 /08150
- ^{1} French Land Register data, which excludes lakes, ponds, glaciers > 1 km^{2} (0.386 sq mi or 247 acres) and river estuaries.

Murtin-et-Bogny (French pronunciation: [myʁtɛ̃ e bɔɲi]) is a commune in the Ardennes department and Grand Est region of north-eastern France.

== Geography ==
The Sormonne, a left tributary of the Meuse, flows through the commune from west to east.

== Population ==
Historical population
Year	Pop.	±% p.a.
1968	142	—
1975	131	−1.15%
1982	128	−0.33%
1990	126	−0.20%
1999	142	+1.34%
2007	178	+2.86%
2012	174	−0.45%
2017	182	+0.90%
2023	168	−1.33%
Source: INSEE

== See also ==
- Communes of the Ardennes department
