= André Dhôtel =

French writer, novelist, storyteller and poet

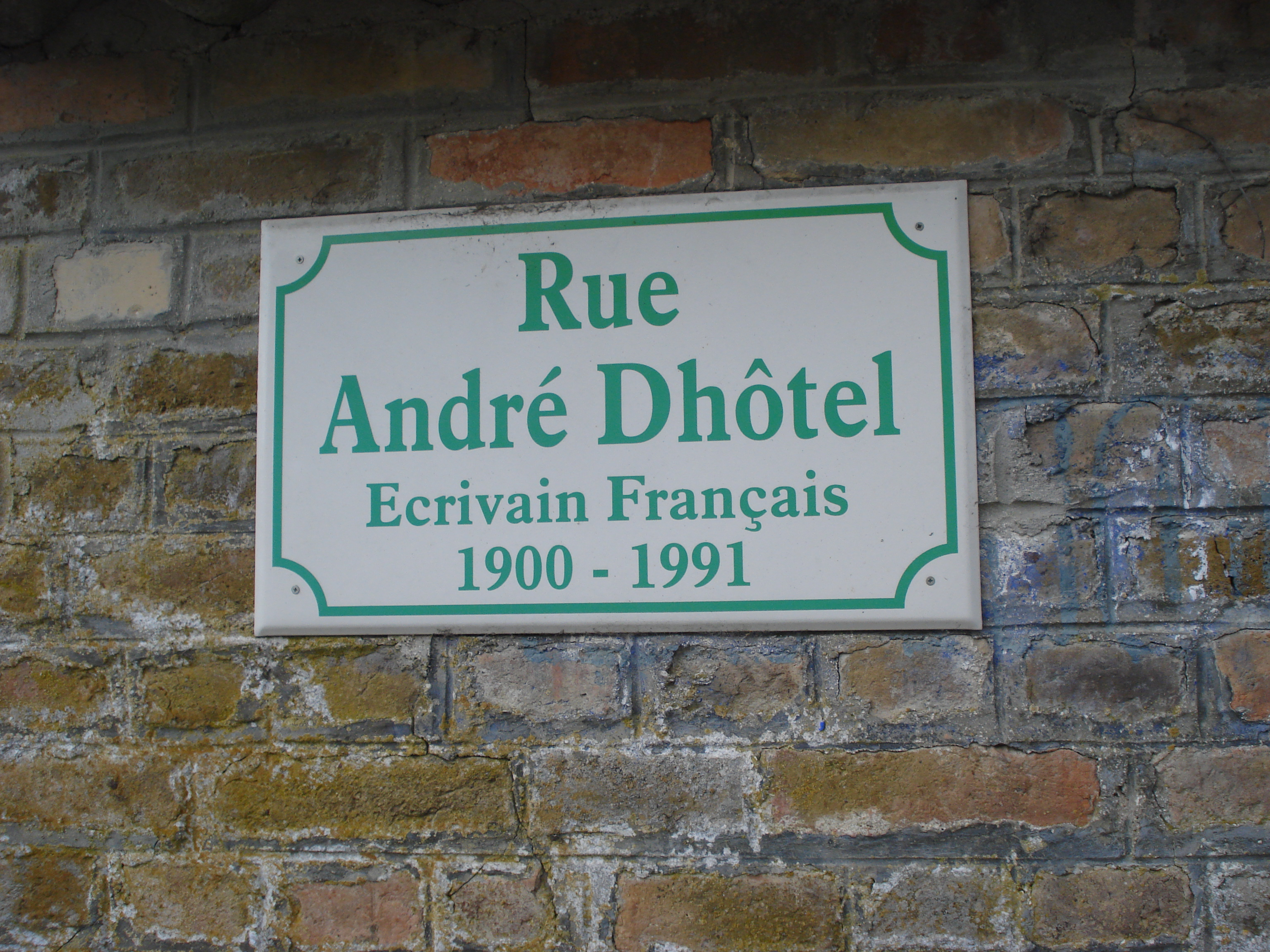
Rue André Dhôtel in Mont-de-Jeux

André Dhôtel (French pronunciation: [ɑ̃dʁe dotɛl]; 1 September 1900 in Attigny, Ardennes – 22 July 1991 in Paris) was a French writer, novelist, storyteller, and poet. He is still very well known for his book Le Pays où l'on n'arrive jamais (1955), which won the Femina Prize in 1955.
