= Gedinne =

Municipality in Wallonia, Belgium

Gedinne Djeden (Walloon)
- Municipality
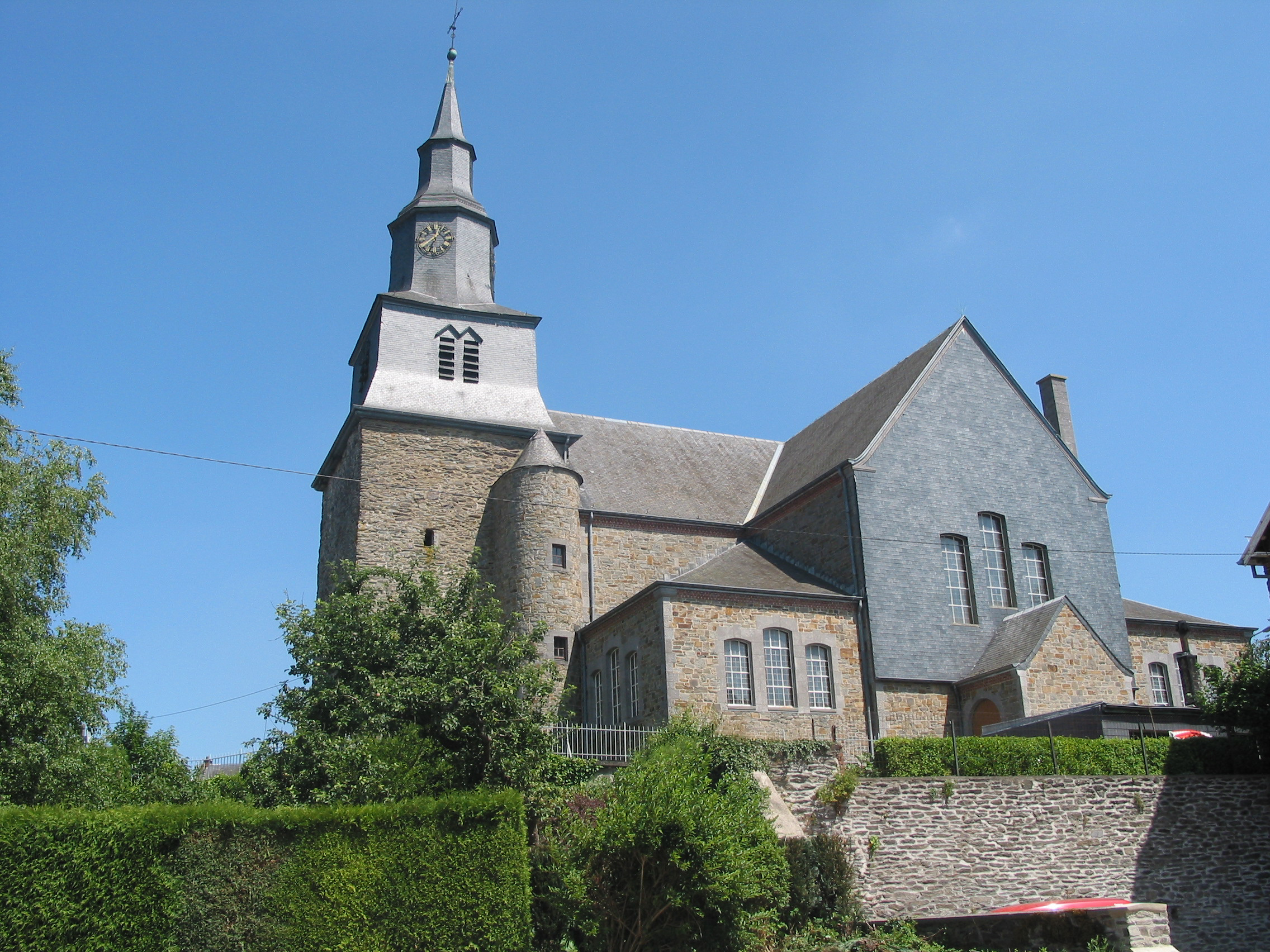
- Gedinne: the church of Our Lady of the Nativity

- Flag Coat of arms

- Location of Gedinne in Namur province
- Interactive map of Gedinne
- Location in Belgium
- Coordinates: 49°59′N 04°56′E
- Country: Belgium
- Community: French Community
- Region: Wallonia
- Province: Namur
- Arrondissement: Dinant

Government
  - Mayor: Vincent Massinon
  - Governing party: Gedinne2018

Area
  - Total: 151.56 km^{2} (58.52 sq mi)

Population (2018-01-01)
  - Total: 4,563
  - Density: 30.11/km^{2} (77.98/sq mi)
- Postal codes: 5575
- NIS code: 91054
- Area codes: 061
- Website: actugedinne.be

Gedinne (French pronunciation: [ʒə.din]; Walloon: Djedene) is a municipality of Wallonia located in the province of Namur, Belgium.

On 1 January 2006 the municipality had 4,405 inhabitants. The total area is 151.56 km^{2} (58.52 sq mi), giving a population density of 29 inhabitants per square kilometre (75/sq mi).

It is situated in the Ardennes east of Meuse valley. The western limit of the municipality is the French border.

The municipality consists of the town of Gedinne and eleven villages: (number of inhabitants in brackets)

- Gedinne (1,124, administrative centre)
- Bourseigne-Neuve (137)
- Bourseigne-Vieille (106)
- Houdremont (233)
- Louette-Saint-Denis (331)
- Louette-Saint-Pierre (270)
- Malvoisin (298)
- Patignies (242)
- Rienne (736)
- Sart-Custinne (169)
- Vencimont (499)
- Willerzie (319)

== See also ==
- List of protected heritage sites in Gedinne
- Tour du Millénaire, a remarkable timber and steel observation tower, built in 2001.
