= Departmental Council of Ardennes =

Departmental legislature in France

Departmental Council of Ardennes Conseil départemental des Ardennes
- Logo of the Council

Leadership
- President: Noël Bourgeois, LR since 16 October 2017

Meeting place
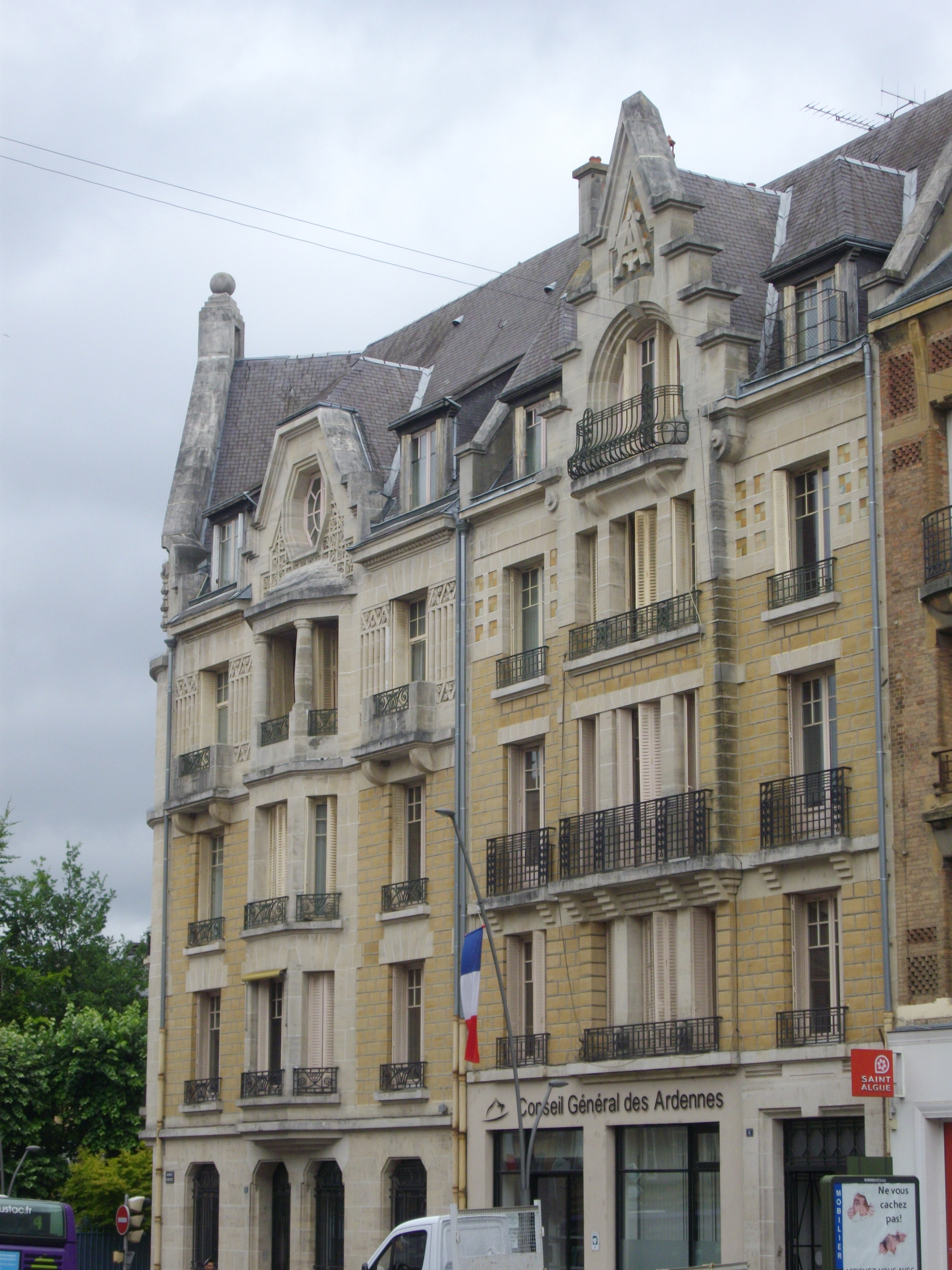
- Hôtel du Département, Charleville-Mézières

Website
- www.cd08.fr

The Departmental Council of Ardennes (French: Conseil départemental des Ardennes) is the deliberative assembly of the French department of the Ardennes. Its headquarters are in Charleville-Mézières.

== Executive ==
=== President ===
The president of the departmental council of Ardennes is Noël Bourgeois (DVD) since October 16, 2017.

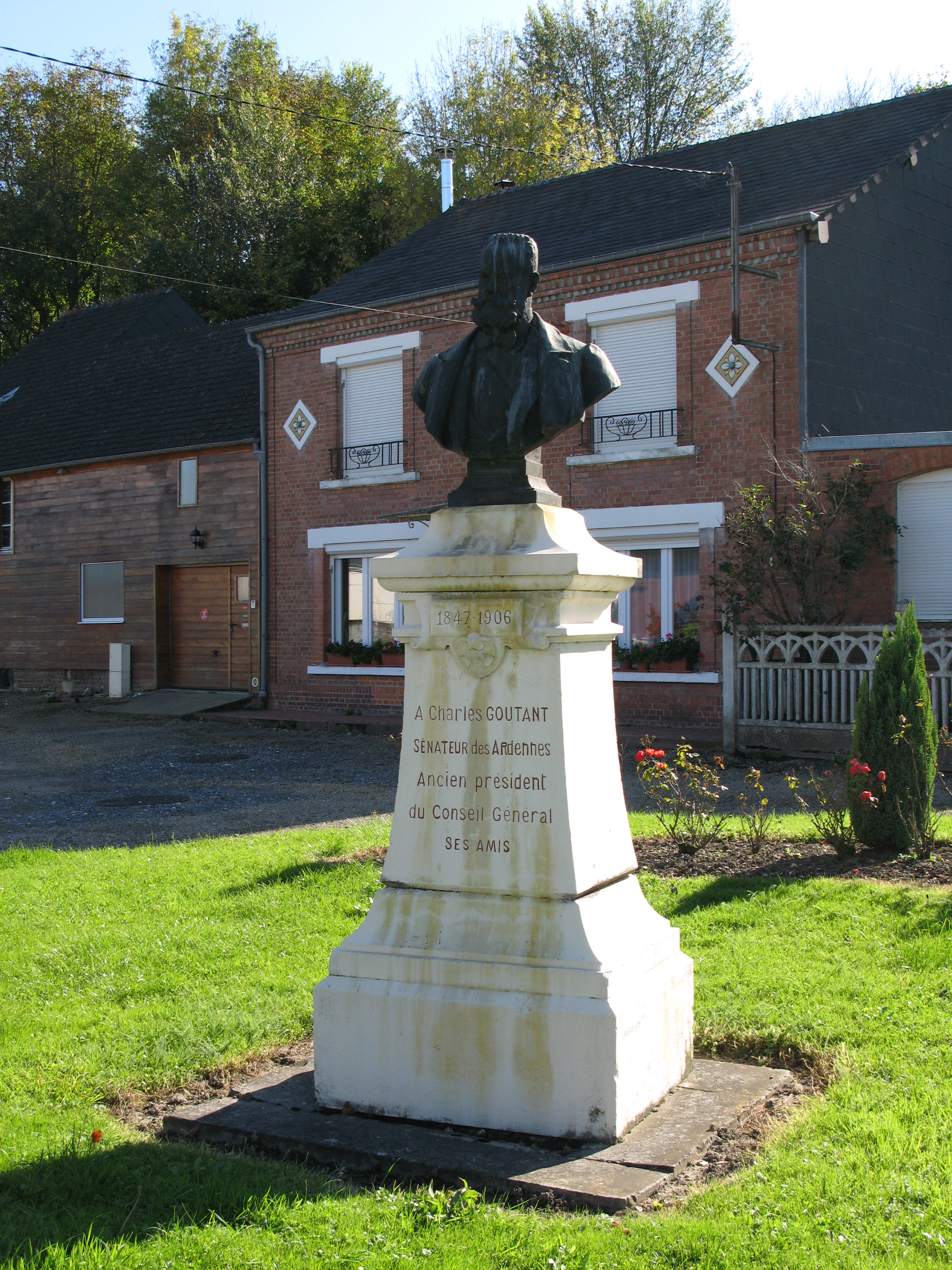
Monument erected in memory of Charles Goutant, the 5th President of the General Council, in Liart.

List of successive presidents of the general and departmental council
| Term | | Name | Party | Ref. |
|---|---|---|---|---|
| 1871 | 1880 | Alfred Chanzy | | |
| 1880 | 1893 | Théophile Armand Neveux | | |
| 1893 | 1898 | Louis Tirman | | |
| 1898 | 1901 | Ernest Couet | | |
| 1901 | 1904 | Charles Goutant | | |
| 1904 | 1912 | Gustave Gobron | | |
| 1912 | 1924 | Henri Dunaime | Radical Left | |
| 1924 | 1938 | Lucien Hubert | Independent Radicals | |
| 1938 | 1940 | Lucien Jullich | Independent Radicals | |
| 1945 | 1955 | Jacques Bozzi | SFIO | |
| 1955 | 1967 | Camille Lassaux | SFIO | |
| 1967 | 1973 | Camille Titeux | SFIO | |
| 1973 | 1976 | René Tinant | CD | |
| 1976 | 1982 | Eugène Cuif | DVD | |
| 1979 | 1982 | Gabriel Sacrez | RPR | |
| 1982 | 1995 | Jacques Sourdille | RPR | |
| 1995 | 2004 | Roger Aubry | DVD | |
| 2004 | 2017 | Benoît Huré | UMP | |
| 2017 | | Noël Bourgeois | DVD | |

=== Vice-presidents ===
| Order | Name | Party | Canton (constituency) |
|---|---|---|---|
| 1st | Anne Dumay | DVD | Sedan-2 |
| 2nd | Jean Godard | UCD | Sedan-1 |
| 3rd | Anne Fraipont | DVD | Vouziers |
| 4th | Marc Wathy | UD | Carignan |
| 5th | Odile Berteloodt | DVD | Sedan-3 |
| 6th | Renaud Averly | UD | Château Porcien |
| 7th | Marie-Josée Moser | UGC | Charleville-Mézières-4 |
| 8th | Brice Fauvarque | UD | Rocroi |

=== Departmental councillors ===
The departmental council of Ardennes includes 38 departmental councilors from the 19 cantons of Ardennes.

Political composition
| Party | Acronym | Elected |
Majority (30 seats)
| The Republicans | LR | 21 |
| Miscellaneous right | DVD | 6 |
| Debout la France | DLF | 1 |
| La République En Marche! | LREM | 1 |
| Others | DIV | 1 |
Opposition (8 seats)
| Socialist Party | PS | 4 |
| Miscellaneous left | DVG | 2 |
| Others | DIV | 2 |
