= Antoine Léon Morel-Fatio =

French painter and politician (1810–1871)

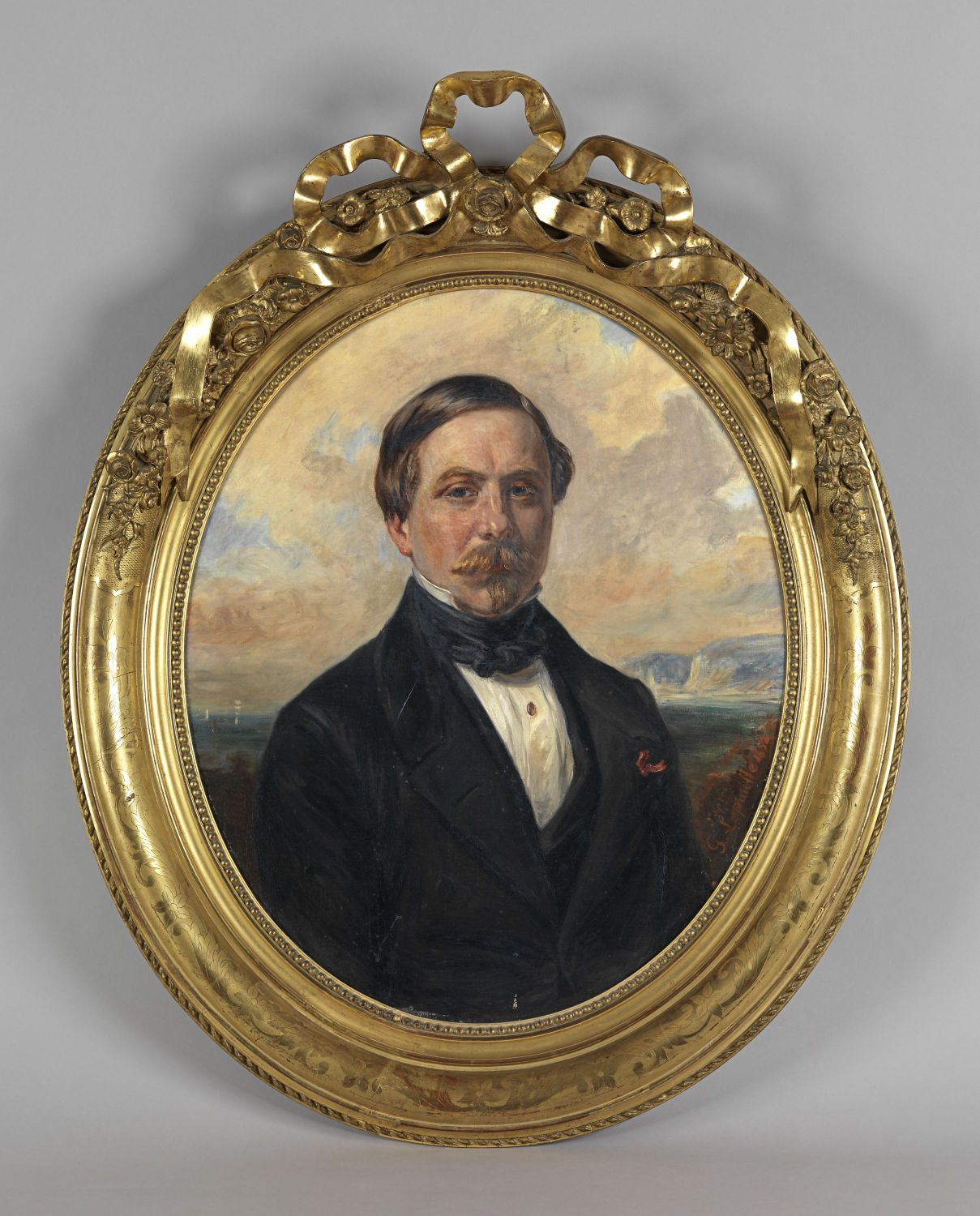
- Portrait by Emmanuel Barcet, 1915
- Born: Antoine Léon Morel; 17 January 1810; Rouen, Normandy
- Died: 2 March 1871 (aged 61); Paris, Île-de-France
- Movement: Marine art

Antoine Léon Morel-Fatio (born Antoine Léon Morel; 17 January 1810 – 2 March 1871) was a Swiss-French painter and politician who served as the Peintre de la Marine in 1854. Born in Rouen, Normandy, he added "Fatio" to his surname in 1844 to distinguish himself from a businessman of the same name. Morel-Fatio subsequently moved to Paris, where he painted marine art and was appointed as the curator of the naval and ethnographic sections of the Louvre in addition to serving as the mayor of the 20th arrondissement of Paris. In 1871, he died of a myocardial infarction during the Franco-Prussian War after witnessing Prussian Army troops entering the Louvre.

== Life ==
When he still very young his father, Étienne-Louis Morel of Switzerland, moved the family to Paris to open a bank. He was enrolled at the prestigious Lycée Louis-le-Grand, but he was dismissed for lack of discipline in 1824. He finished his studies at the Lycée Condorcet (then known as the Collège Royal de Bourbon). In 1827, he enlisted as a pilot on a British merchant ship to learn navigation. Upon his return he began work at the family bank, but spent much of his time decorating the account books with ornamentation.

His family then placed him with the banking firm of Jean Charles Joachim Davillier, but he soon renounced the profession. His artistic inclinations led him to keep company with the marine painter Adolphe-Hippolyte Couveley. He briefly studied with several artists, and made trips to Italy, but his career began in earnest in 1830, when he accompanied an expedition to Algeria and witnessed the actions of naval commander Guy-Victor Duperré. He made sketches and created two paintings that were exhibited at the Salon of 1833 with great success. He would be a regular exhibitor there from that time on.

In 1838, he was commissioned by Horace Vernet, Director of the Académie de France à Rome, to accompany him in a French squadron to Mexico, witness and paint what would become known as the Battle of Veracruz. The following year, he was part of a squadron commanded by Admiral Julien Pierre Anne Lalande and debarked in Istanbul, where he witnessed a fire that broke out in Pera, spread to Galata and threatened to destroy the wealthiest part of the city. In 1840, he painted a scene depicting the remains of Napoleon being returned to France from St. Helena. He would later accompany President Louis Napoléon Bonaparte on his travels. In 1845, he married Louise Françoise Aimée Ernestine du Chastel (1815–1876), the daughter of Maréchal de Camp, Louis Claude du Chastel. They had two children; a son and a daughter. in 1846, he was named a Chevalier in the Legion of Honor.

In 1849, he was appointed Deputy Curator at the Naval Museum in the Louvre. Three years later, following the resignation of Apollinaire Lebas, he became the Director as well. He was named a Peintre de la Marine in 1853. In 1854, he took part in the Crimean War as an official painter and witnessed the Battle of Bomarsund. Upon his return, he and Jean-Baptiste Henri Durand-Brager published views of the coast of the Black Sea. Shortly after, he visited Scandinavia, Normandy and Brittany, where he painted scenes of old ships. In 1857, he was promoted to full Curator at the museum. He served as the first Mayor of the 20th Arrondissement of Paris from 1860 to 1869. He died in 1871, during the Franco-Prussian War. While standing on a balcony at the Louvre, observing events, he saw the Prussian Army invading the museum and suffered a fatal heart attack. He was found there by his staff, several hours later. He was buried in Montmartre Cemetery.

== Gallery ==
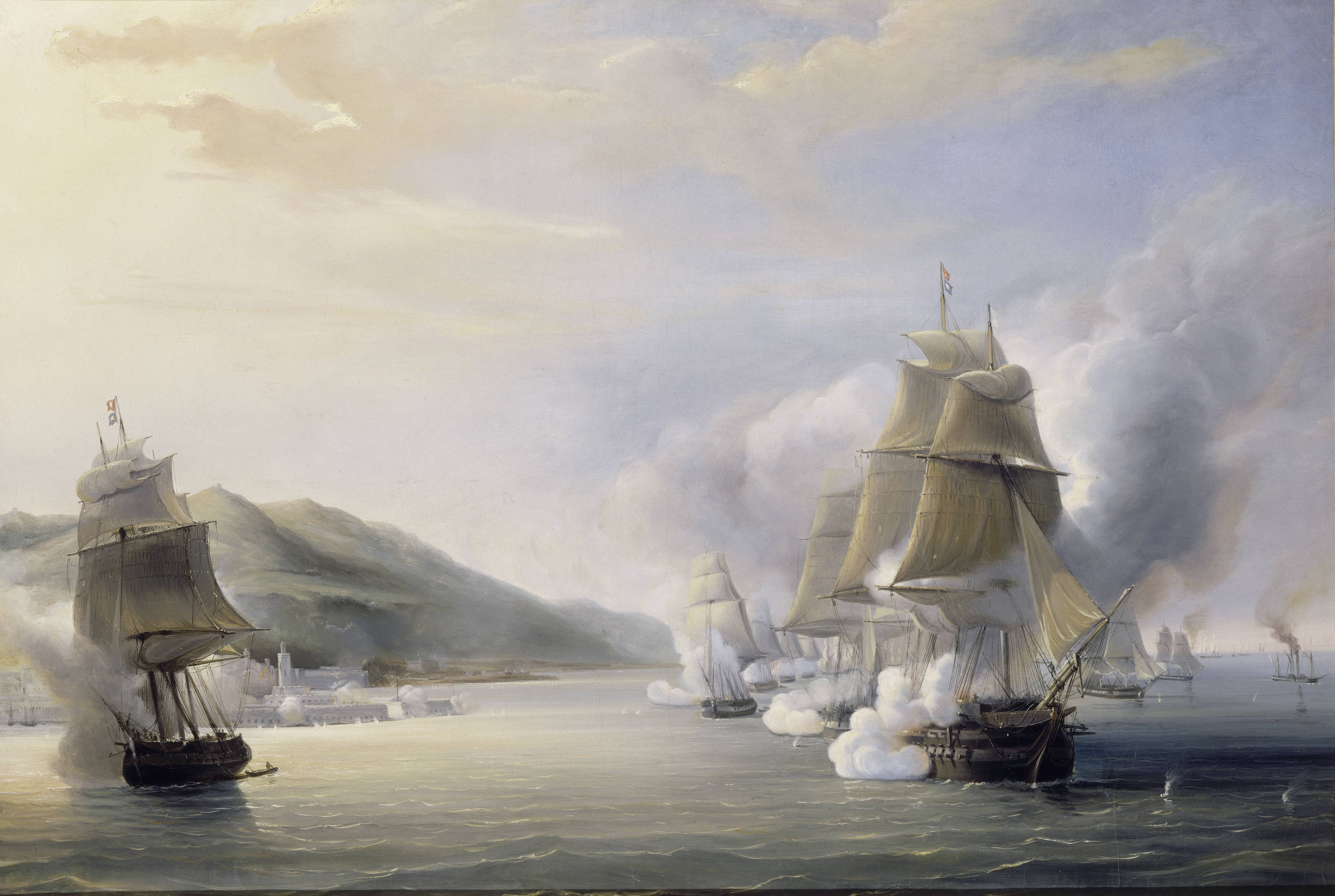
Attack on Algiers by Sea, July 3, 1830 (1836)

Naval Battle of Cape St. Vincent (1842)

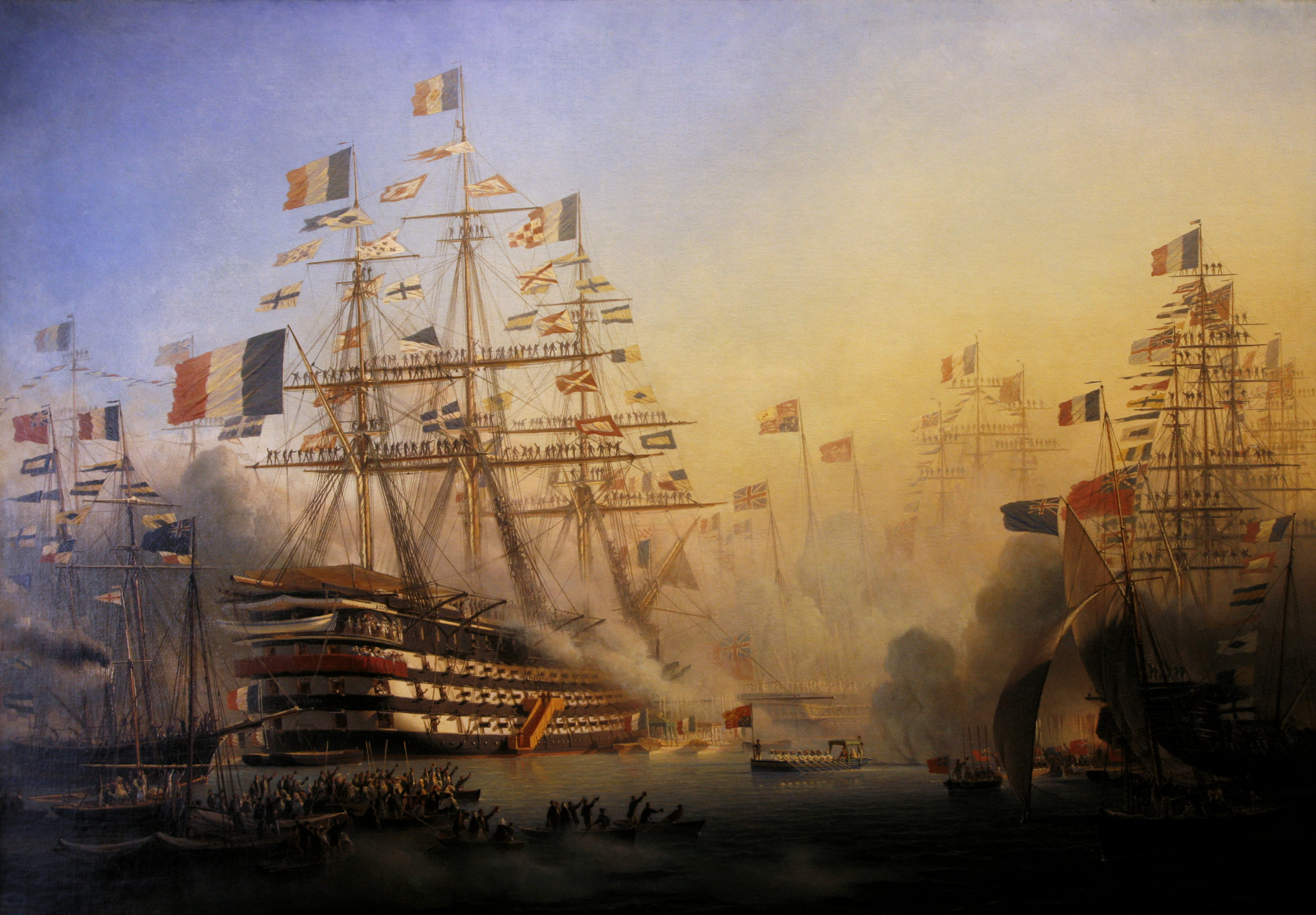
Queen Victoria at Cherbourg, 6 August 1858 (1859)

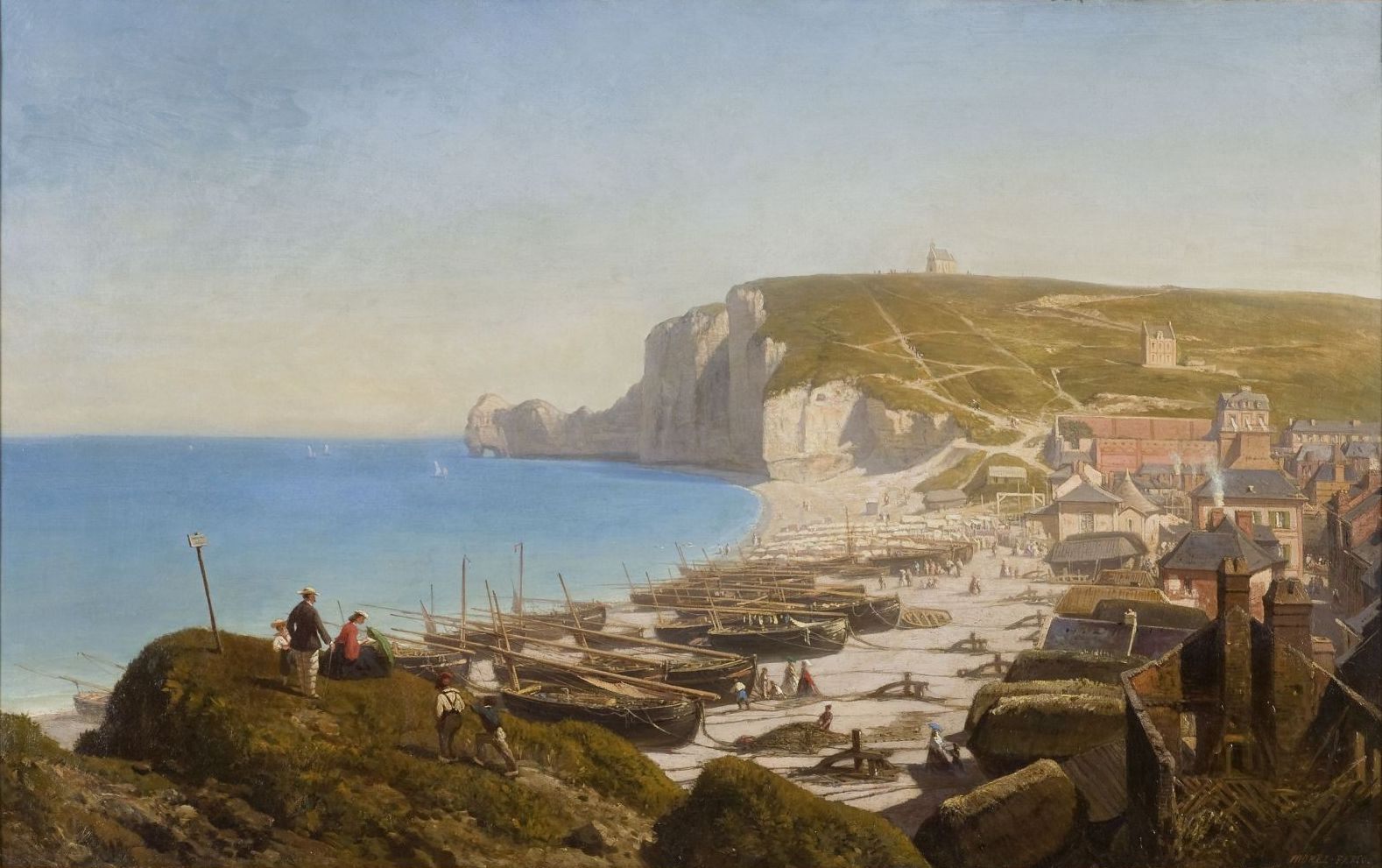
Panoramic view of Etretat (1860)

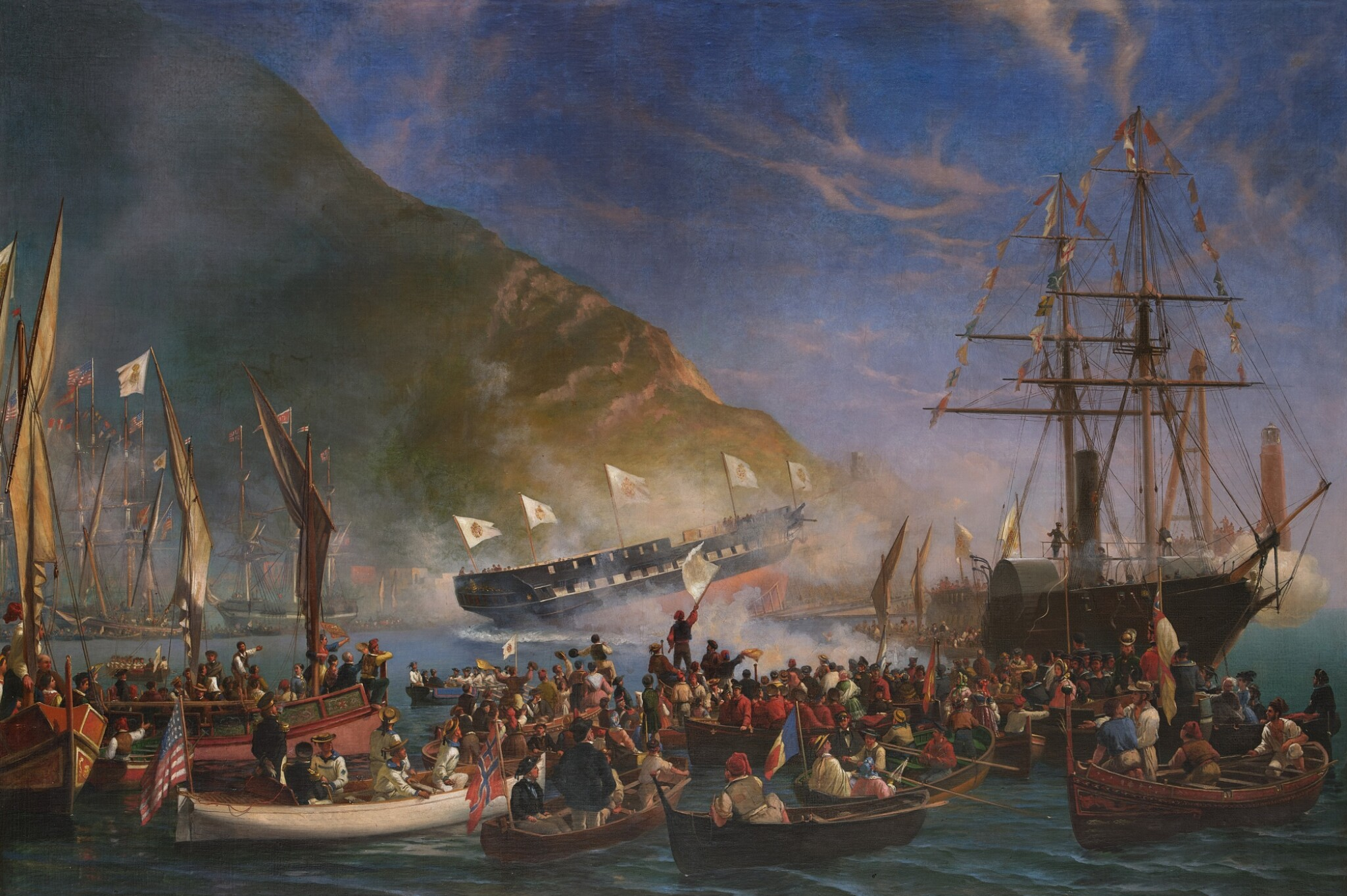
The Launch of the Garibaldi in Naples, 28th January 1860 (Date unknown)

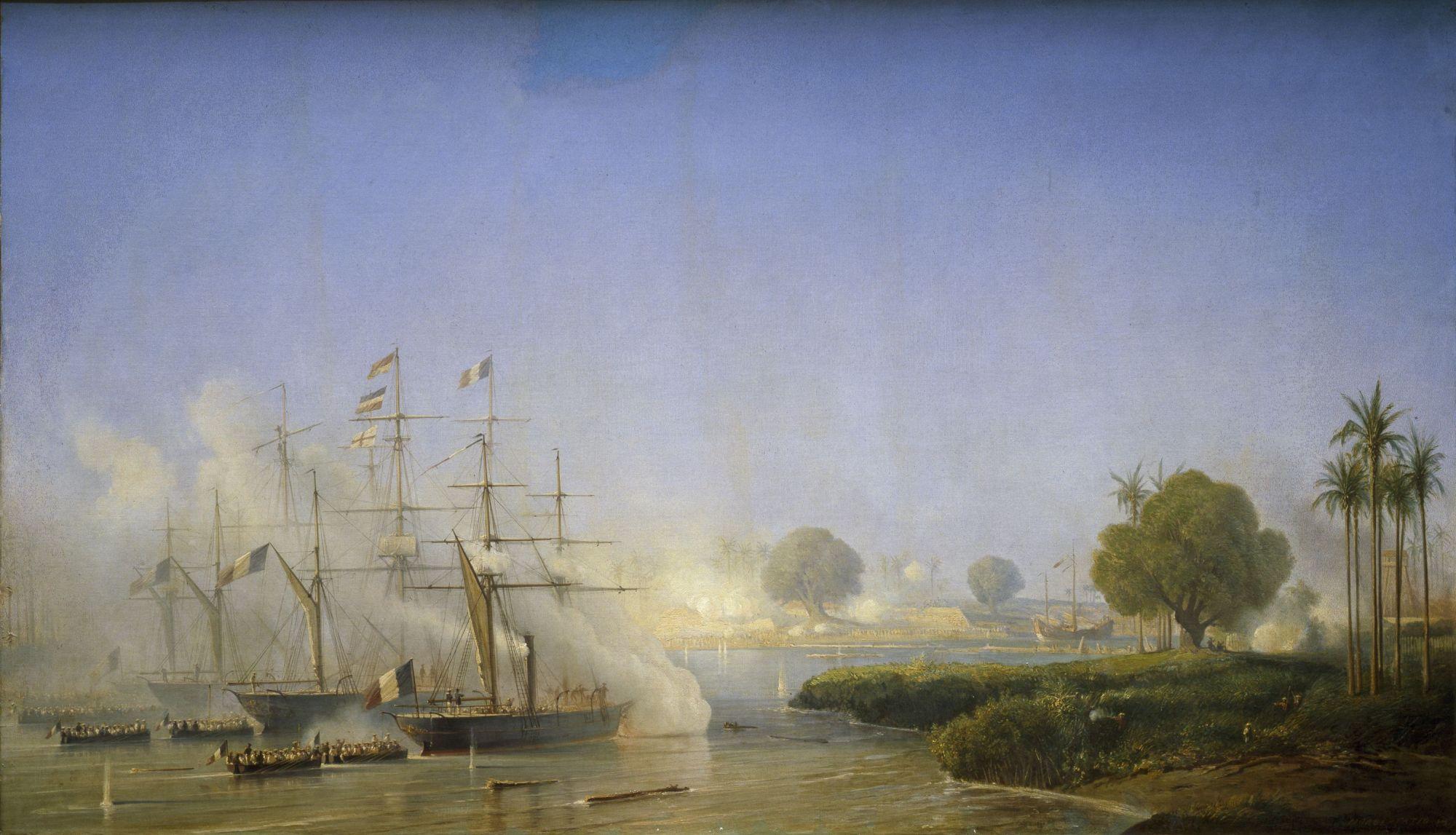
Capture of Saigon, 18 February 1859 (1867)

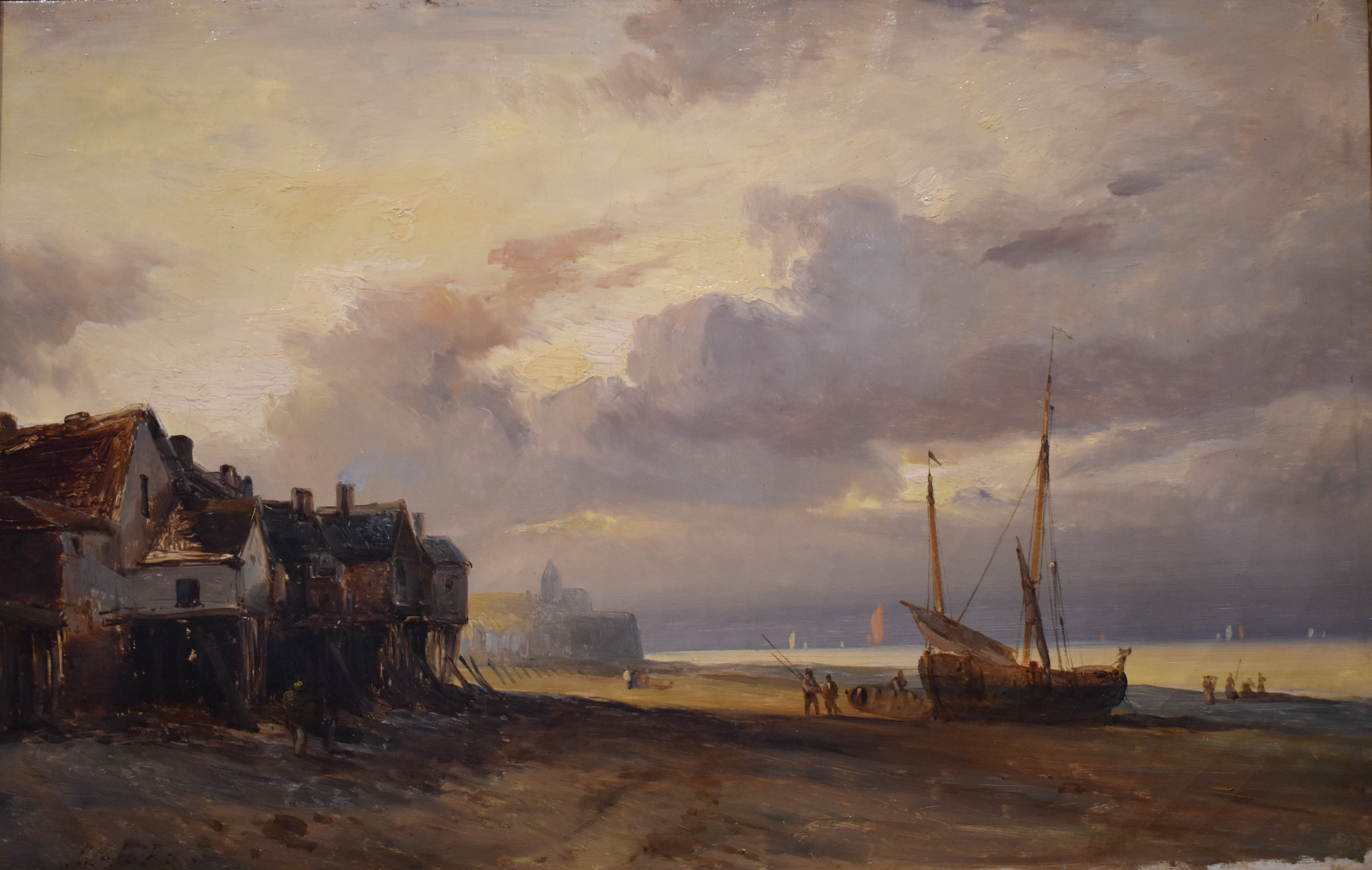
The beach (Date unknown)
