= Cantons of the Ardennes department =

The following is a list of the 19 cantons of the Ardennes department, in France, following the French canton reorganisation which came into effect in March 2015:

- Attigny
- Bogny-sur-Meuse
- Carignan
- Charleville-Mézières-1
- Charleville-Mézières-2
- Charleville-Mézières-3
- Charleville-Mézières-4
- Château-Porcien
- Givet
- Nouvion-sur-Meuse
- Rethel
- Revin
- Rocroi
- Sedan-1
- Sedan-2
- Sedan-3
- Signy-l'Abbaye
- Villers-Semeuse
- Vouziers
