= Italian ship Giuseppe Garibaldi =

Italian ship Giuseppe Garibaldi may refer to:

- Italian frigate Giuseppe Garibaldi
- Italian cruiser Giuseppe Garibaldi (1899), armoured cruiser
- Italian cruiser Giuseppe Garibaldi (1936), light cruiser, recommissioned in 1961 as guided missile cruiser
- Italian aircraft carrier Giuseppe Garibaldi, launched in 1983; commissioned on 30 September 1985; decommissioned on 1 December 2024

All the ships named Giuseppe Garibaldi had as their motto Obbedisco ("I obey").

== See also ==
- Italian destroyer Garibaldino
