= Hôtel de Ville, Charleville-Mézières =

Town hall in Charleville-Mézières, France

Hôtel de Ville
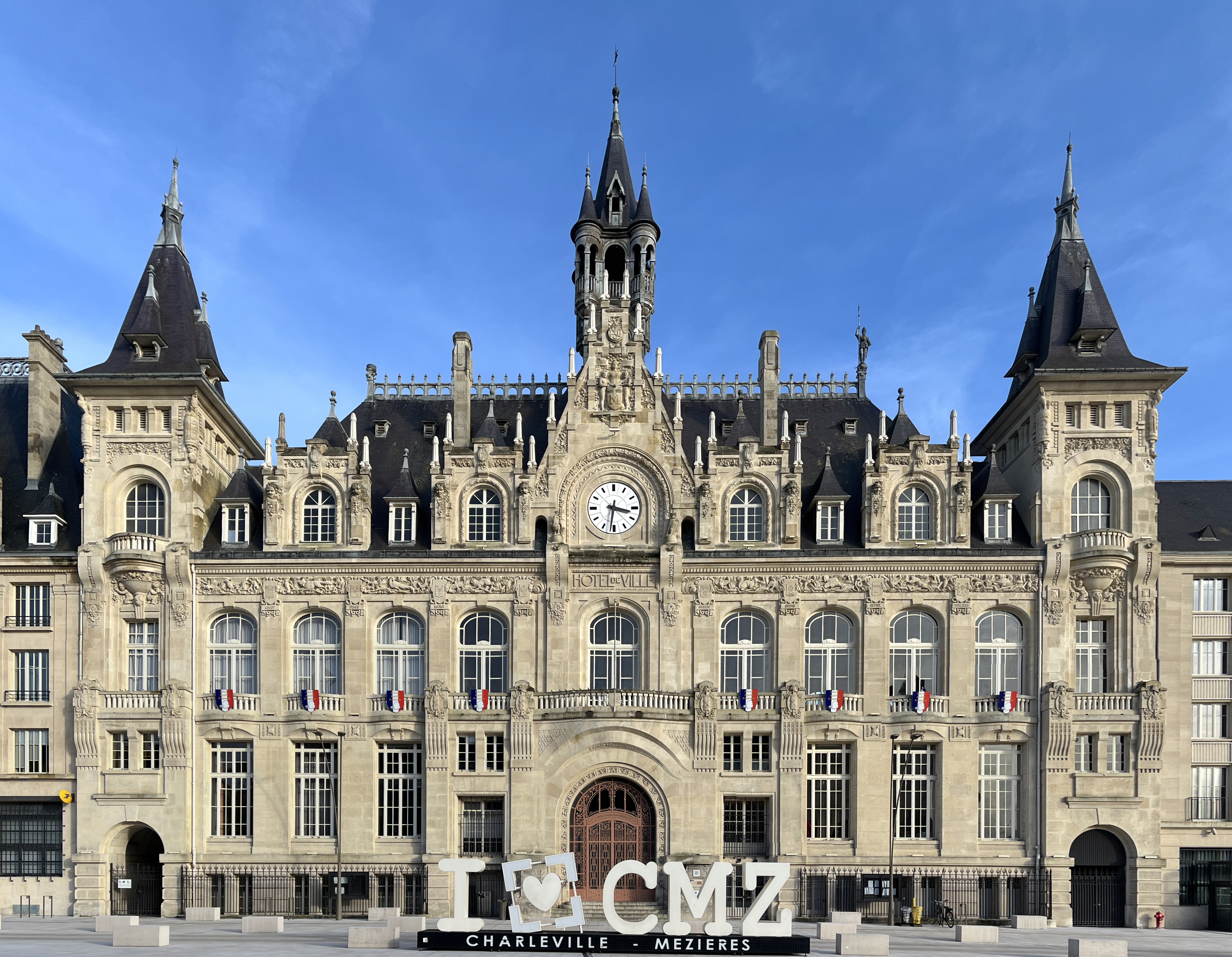
- The main frontage of the Hôtel de Ville in January 2024

General information
- Type: City hall
- Architectural style: Renaissance Revival style
- Location: Charleville-Mézières, France
- Coordinates: 49.7601°N 4.7194°E
- Completed: 1933

Design and construction
- Architects: Marie Eugène Chifflot and Robert Colle

Monument historique
- Official name: Hôtel de ville de Mézières
- Type: Inscrit
- Designated: 2022
- Reference no.: PA08000021

The Hôtel de Ville (French pronunciation: [otɛl də vil], City Hall) is a municipal building in Charleville-Mézières, Ardennes in northeastern France, standing on Place de l'Hôtel de Ville. It was designated a monument historique by the French government in 2022.

== History ==
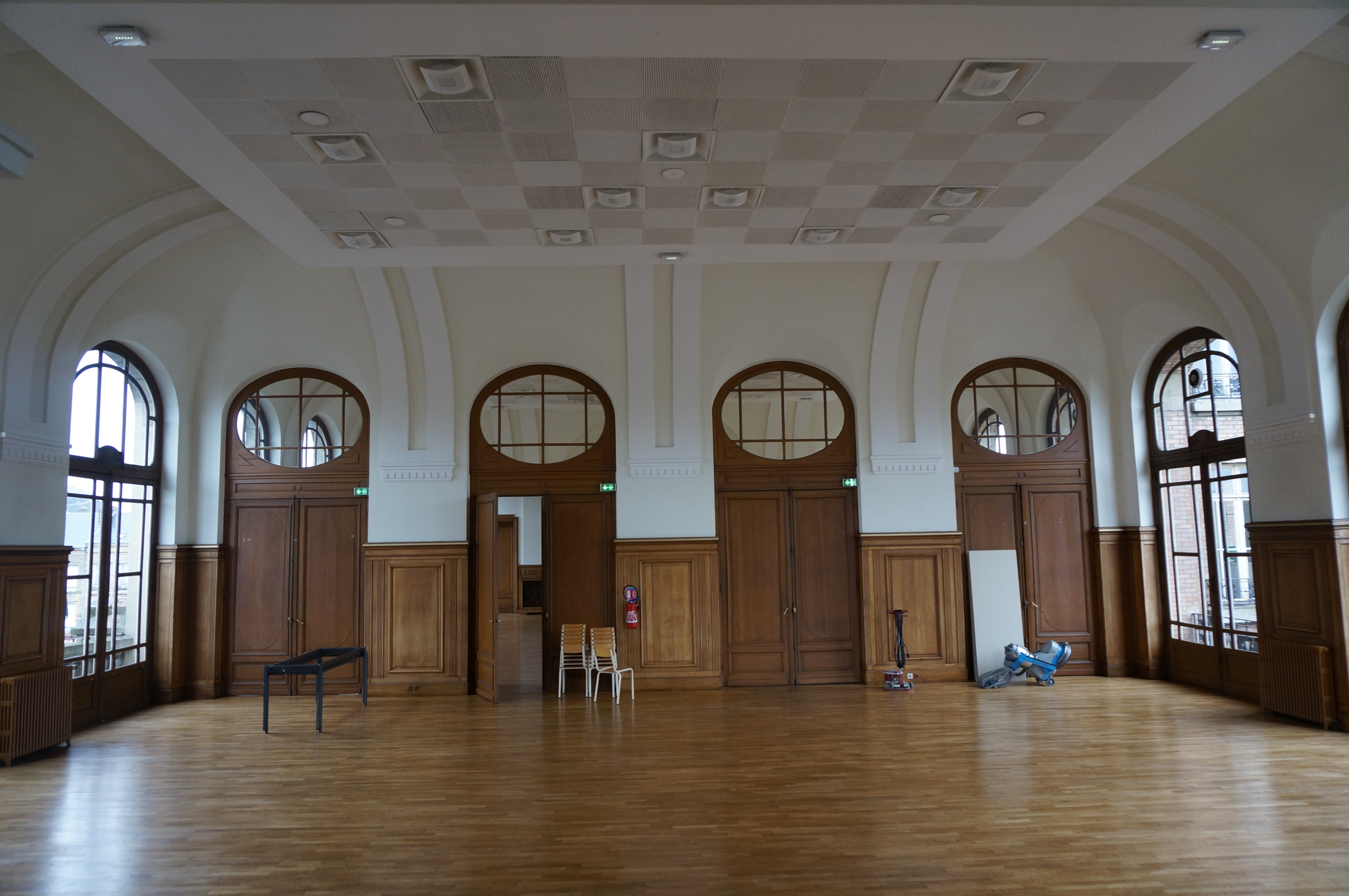
The Grand Salon

In the Middle Ages, the aldermen of Mézières met at the Maison Commune, the location of which has been lost to time. In August 1732, the aldermen decided to commission a new town hall. The site they selected was in the Place de Grève (now Place de la Préfecture). Work on the new building started in 1734. It was designed by Pierre Cosson in the neoclassical style, built in ashlar stone and was completed in around 1736. The design involved an asymmetrical main frontage of 13 bays facing onto Place de Grève. The left-hand section of eight bays, which was single storey, featured a round headed doorway with a forestair in the sixth bay and was fenestrated by rounded-headed windows in the other bays, while the right-hand section of five bays was fenestrated by round-headed windows on both floors. The old town hall was badly damaged by shelling between 8 November and 11 November 1918 during the final offensive by Marshal Ferdinand Foch in the closing days of the First World War.

After the war, the town council led by the mayor, Henri Roussel, decided to commission a new town hall. Part of the old walled town of Mézières were cleared of wartime debris, and a new town square was created. A war memorial, sculpted by Alphonse Colle and intended to commemorate the lives of local people who had died in the First World War, was unveiled at the south end of the new square in 1927.

Work on the construction of a new town hall on the east side of the new square also began in 1927. It was designed by Marie Eugène Chifflot and Robert Colle in the Renaissance Revival style, built in ashlar stone and was officially opened by the president of France, Albert Lebrun, on 16 July 1933. The Lord Mayor of Manchester, Sir William Walker, was also in attendance, in recognition of the financial support given by the City of Manchester to the reconstruction of Mézières.

The design involved a symmetrical main frontage of 11 bays facing onto Place de l'Hôtel de Ville. The central bay featured a large round-headed doorway on the ground floor, a French door with a balustraded balcony on the first floor, and a tall triangular pediment containing a clock above. There was a tall lantern with bartizans behind the clock. The end bays contained round-headed openings on the ground floor, bi-partite windows on the mezzanine floor and casement windows with a keystones on the first floor; the end bays were surmounted by towers, with round-headed windows in the first stage, three small louvres in the second stage, and then steep pyramid-shaped roofs above. The other bays were fenestrated by casement windows on the ground floor, French doors with curved balconies on the first floor, and dormer windows at attic level. The windows on the first floor were flanked by pilasters supporting an elaborate carved frieze depicting wild animals, with a modillioned cornice above. Two statues of Pierre Terrail, seigneur de Bayard were installed on the roof of the building. Internally, the principal rooms were the Grand Salon (grand ballroom) and the Salle de Conseil (council chamber).

The building became the town hall of Charleville-Mézières, after the commune of Mézières was amalgamated with the communes of Charleville, Montcy-Saint-Pierre, Mohon and Etion in 1966.
