= La Francheville =

- Commune
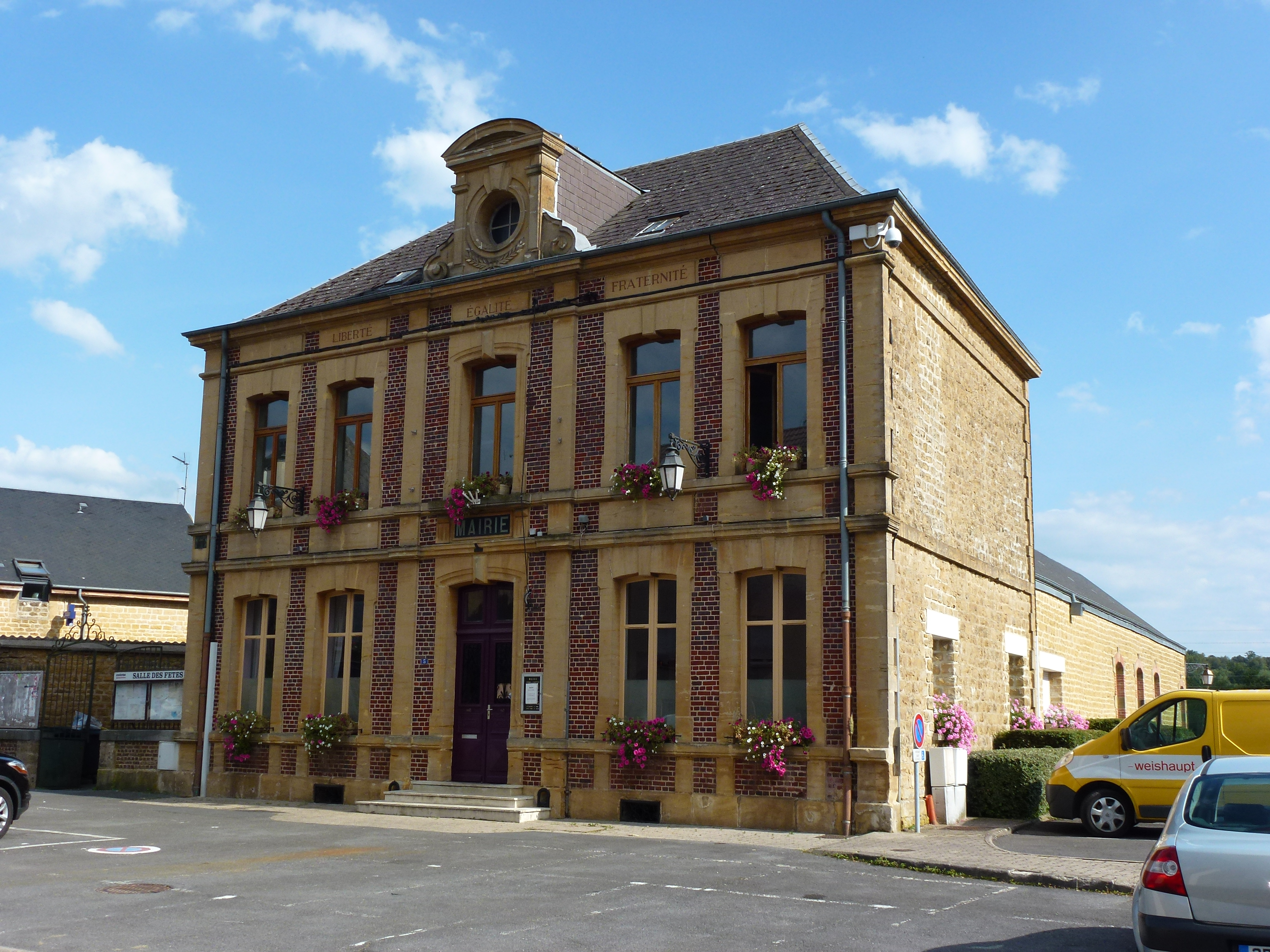
- The town hall in La Francheville

- Coat of arms
- Location of La Francheville
- Location within France Location within Grand Est
- Coordinates: 49°43′50″N 4°42′56″E
- Country: France
- Region: Grand Est
- Department: Ardennes
- Arrondissement: Charleville-Mézières
- Canton: Charleville-Mézières-4
- Intercommunality: CA Ardenne Métropole

Government
  - Mayor (2024–2026): Didier Leroux
- Area^{1}: 6.79 km^{2} (2.62 sq mi)
- Population (2023): 1,636
  - Density: 241/km^{2} (624/sq mi)
- Time zone: UTC+01:00 (CET)
  - Summer (DST): UTC+02:00 (CEST)
- INSEE/Postal code: 08180 /08000
- ^{1} French Land Register data, which excludes lakes, ponds, glaciers > 1 km^{2} (0.386 sq mi or 247 acres) and river estuaries.

La Francheville (French pronunciation: [la fʁɑ̃ʃvil]) is a commune in the Ardennes department in northern France. It lies on the river Vence.

== Population ==
Historical population
Year	Pop.	±% p.a.
1968	1,367	—
1975	1,270	−1.05%
1982	1,077	−2.33%
1990	1,375	+3.10%
1999	1,590	+1.63%
2007	1,592	+0.02%
2012	1,611	+0.24%
2017	1,685	+0.90%
2023	1,636	−0.49%
Source: INSEE

== See also ==
- Communes of the Ardennes department
