= Castle of the fairies =

Ruined castle in Montcy-Notre-Dame, France

- Château défait, or Château du Waridon
- Montcy-Notre-Dame, Ardennes in France
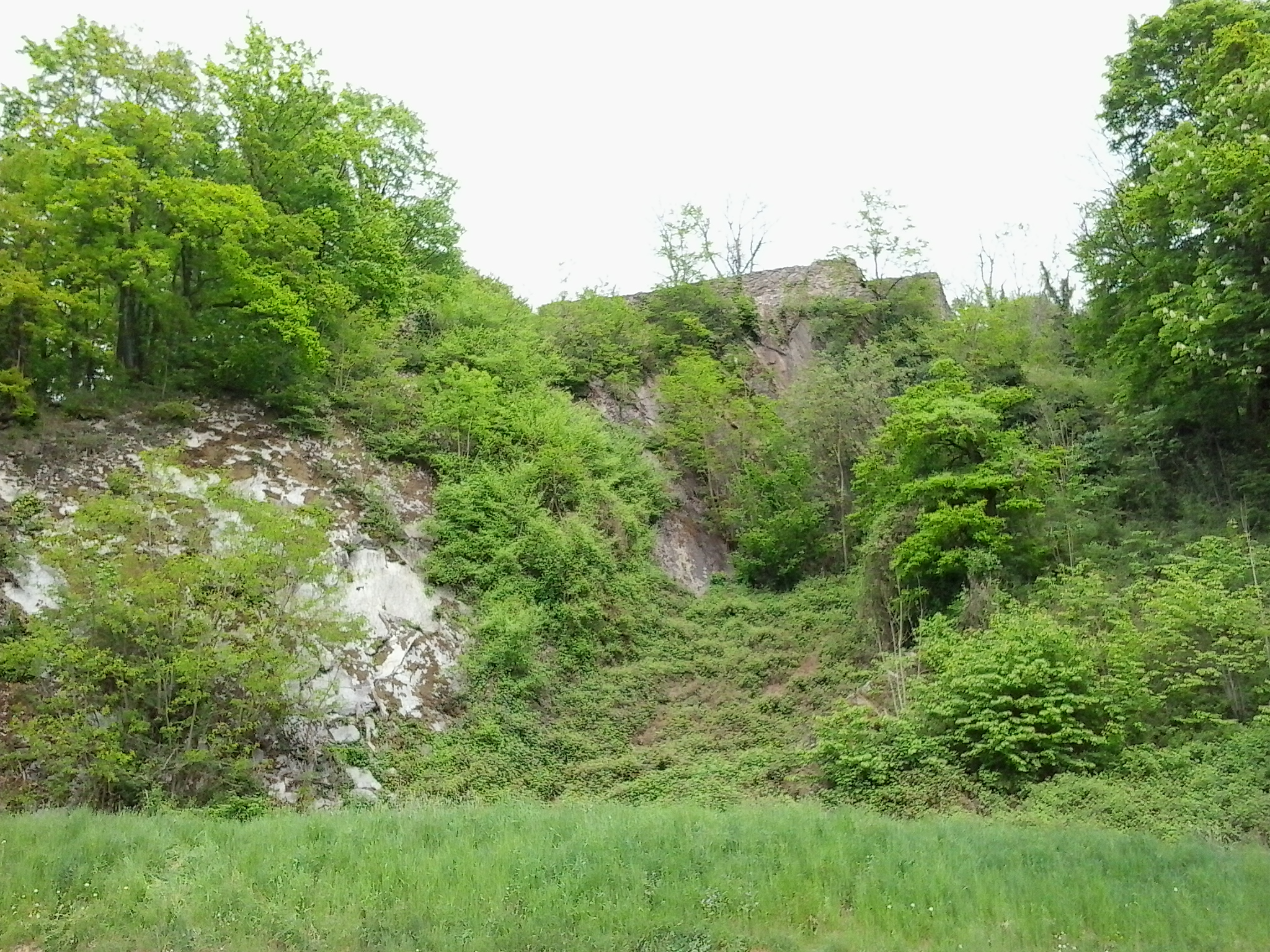

Site information
- Type: Castle
- Condition: Ruined

Location
- Coordinates: 49°46′32″N 4°44′37″E

Site history
- Built: 9th or 11th century to 16th century

The château des fées, château défait or château du Waridon is a medieval fortress whose ruins lie on the upper Meuse near Le Waridon in the commune of Montcy-Notre-Dame) of the Ardennes. Its origins date back to between the 9th and 16th centuries.

This castle seems to have inspired the château d'Oridon mentioned in various manuscripts and chansons de geste, as well as the château de Montessor in The Four Sons of Aymon.

== Location ==
The ruins of this ancient fortress sit on a rocky crag overlooking the Meuse and the Charleville-Mézières neighborhood of Montcy-Saint-Pierre.

== History ==
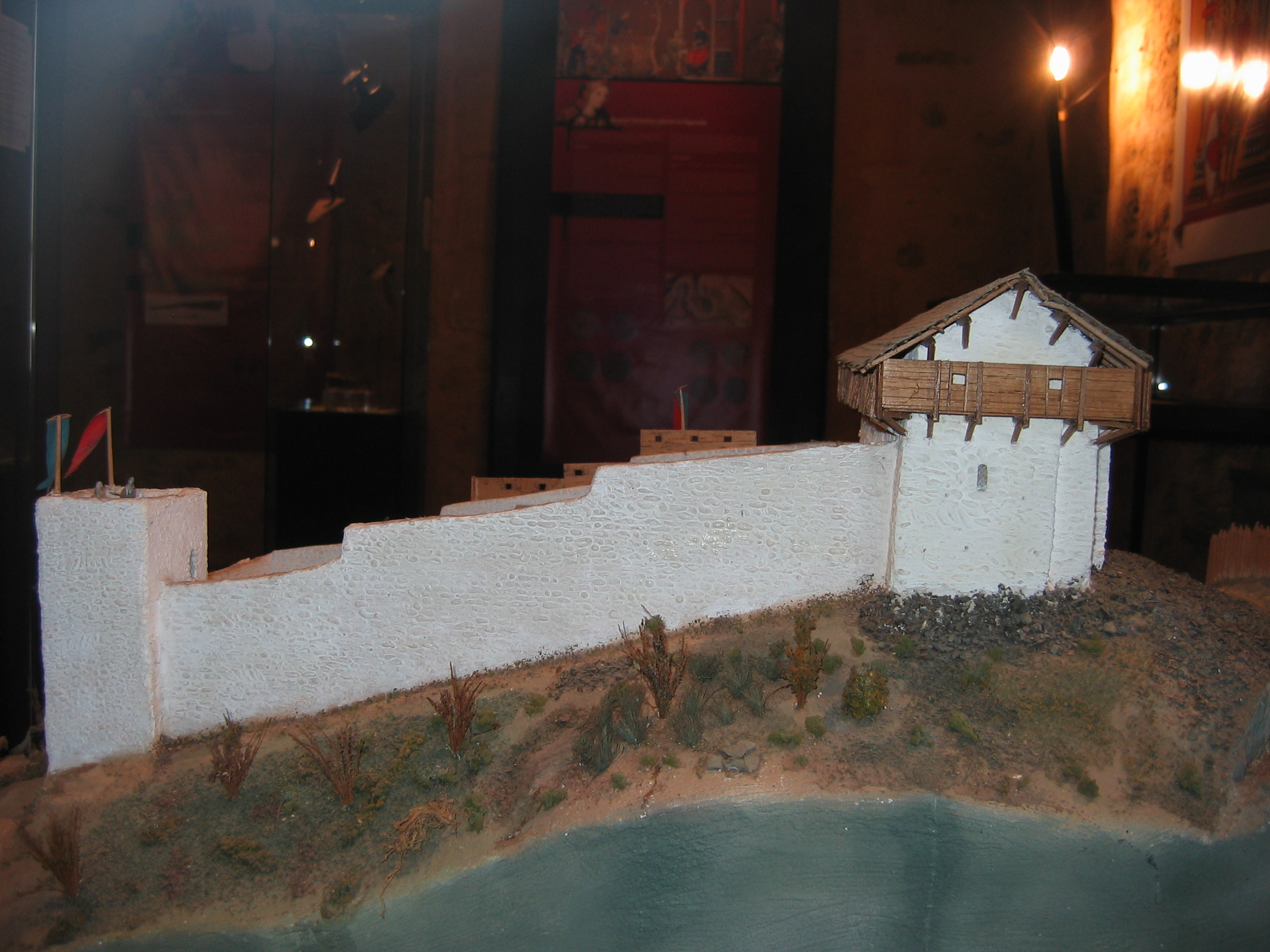
A reconstruction of the château des fées (musée de l'Ardenne, Charleville-Mézières)

Construction of the fortress first began in 870, when the Meuse became a border between successor states of the former Carolingian Empire with the Treaty of Meerssen.

Excavations have uncovered strata with traces of a conflagration at the end of the 10th or the beginning of the 11th century, as dated by coins discovered in the castle keep and outside the fortress walls.

The stone building, the window lead, the very carnivorous diet (Note: The excavation of a rectangular building destroyed in a fire in the beginning of the 11th century found that the kitchen trash primarily consisted of scraps from game animals) speak to the importance of the stewards. At the time, wood was a necessity.

The castle's name at the time is unknown. The name "château des fées" dates back to 1020, no doubt the date of its destruction by the troops of the Roman Catholic Archdiocese of Reims. While legends surrounded the place for centuries, it seems that the name château des fées was a corruption of château défait (ruined castle).

At the beginning of the 16th century the castle was rebuilt by François d’Aspremont, who made it his home. This fort, along with that of Château de Lumes, allowed him to control the riverways to Charleville and to extract ransom from both ships and travellers. He allied himself with Charles Quint, who was interested by the strategic locations of d'Aspremont's domains. D'Aspremont agreed to give hommage to one of Charles Quint"s vassals, the grand bailli de Hainaut. Francis I of France banned and destituted d'Aspremont in 1534, but he held out against royal troops until 1542, pillaging the region. He was forced to flee in 1542.

In 1629, the fortress of Woiru (Woiridon) was attested as destroyed.

== Excavations ==
Excavations have uncovered a dry-stone wall, suggesting a rectangular building of 18 × 10 meters.

These excavations indicate the following chronology:

1. a primitive rectangular building, constructed of perishable materials, since post holes have been discovered;
2. a large rectangular tower of herringbone masonry followed. Its foundations were cut from the rock, then additions were built on the east and west;
3. destruction by fire in the 11th century, as dated by two silver deniers and an obole;
4. rebuilding in the 16th century.

Archeological finds are kept at the musée de l'Ardenne and include lead from the windows, glassware, coins, arrowheads, crossbow quarrels, deadbolts, grain, pottery, and bone fragments from game animals.

== Literature and chansons de geste ==
The castle may have inspired the legendary Montessor, the fortress of The Four Sons of Aymon in the Ardennes, named after Renaud de Montauban. At least, Prosper Tarbé in 1861 tentatively identified the legendary fortress as the château de Waridon in Montcy-Notre-Dame.

As well, a château d'Oridon, "a very tall tower atop a rocky crag in the Ardenne forest", is mentioned in several medieval epic poems: its description and other associated details seem to coincide with the château du Waridon.

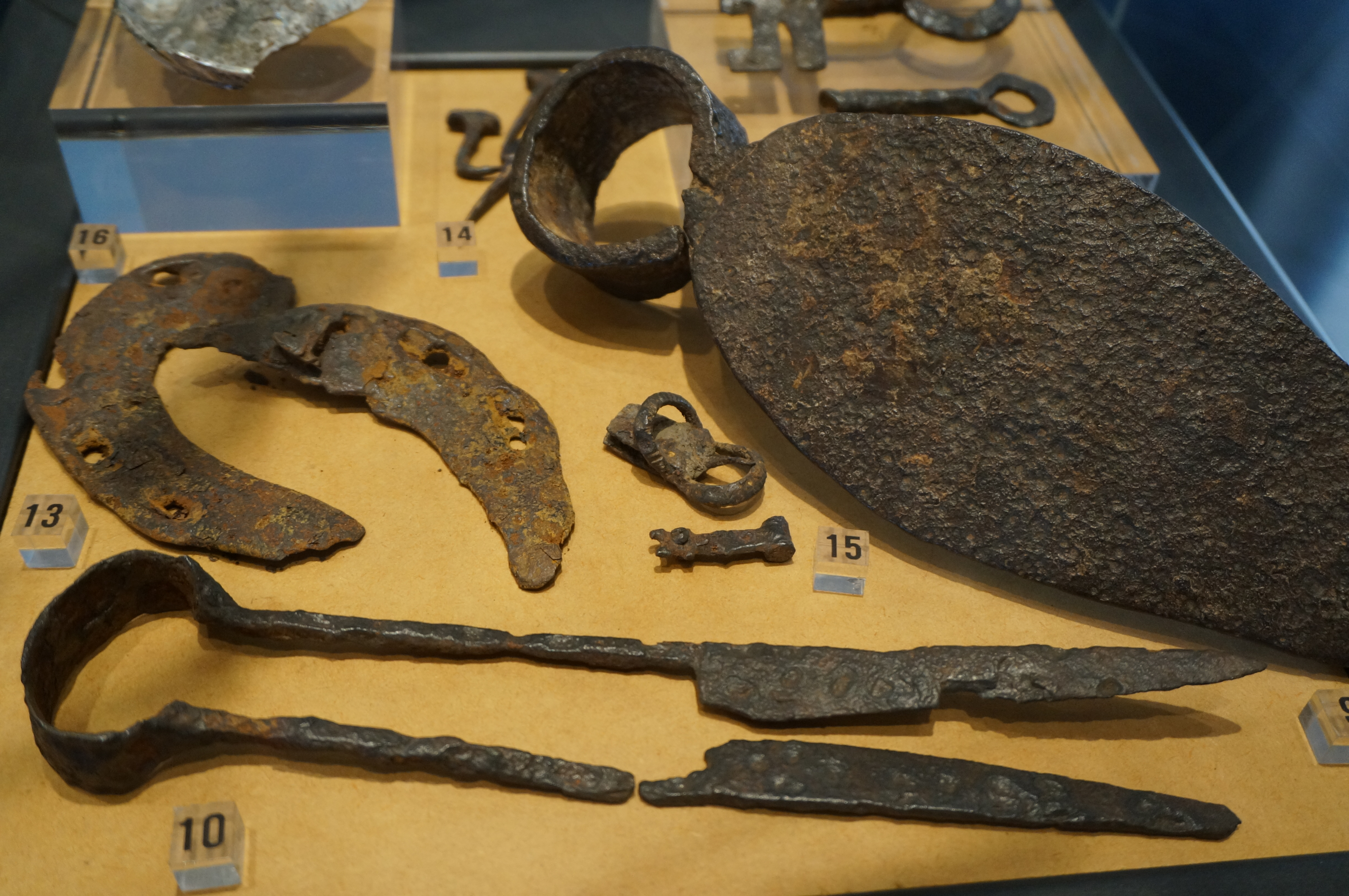
Excavation finds donated to the musée de l'Ardenne.

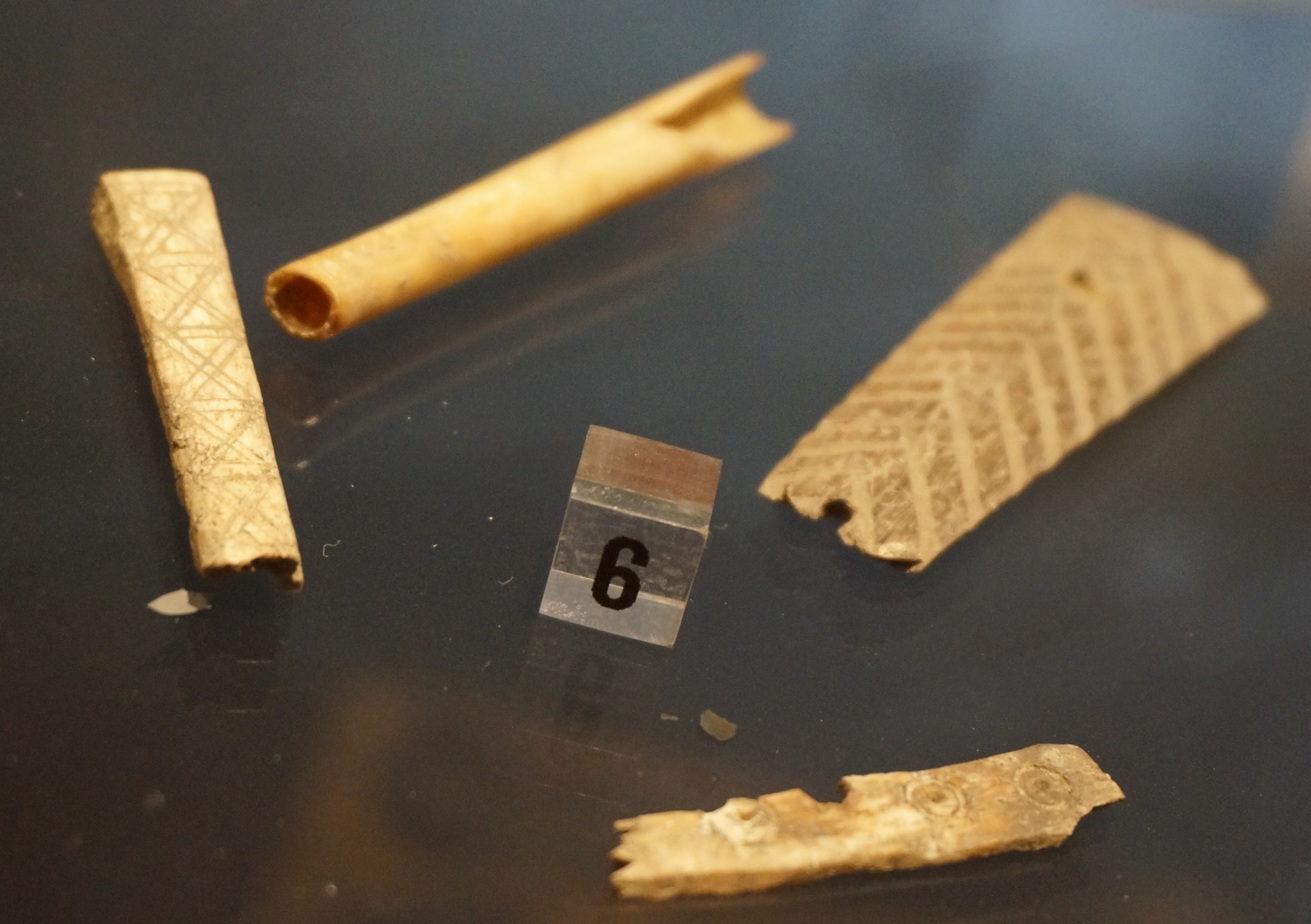
Carved bones found in excavations.
