= David Hallou =

French footballer (born 1966)

Personal information
- Full name: David Hallou
- Date of birth: September 5, 1966 (age 60)
- Place of birth: Montcy-Notre-Dame, France
- Height: 1.78 m (5 ft 10 in)
- Position: Defender

Senior career*
Years	Team	Apps	(Gls)
1986–1992	Sedan	123	(5)
1992–1993	Chamois Niortais	5	(0)
1993–1994	Cluses	?	(?)
- * Club domestic league appearances and goals

David Hallou (born September 5, 1966) is a former professional footballer who played as a defender.
