= Louis Du Four de Longuerue =

Louis Dufour de Longuerue (1652, Charleville-Mézières, Ardennes) – 22 November 1733), abbé of Sept-Fontaines (from 1674) and of Saint-Jean-du-Jard near Melun (from 1684), known simply as the abbé de Longuerue, was an antiquarian, a linguist and historian, a child prodigy who became the protégé of Fénelon; in his turn Longuerue encouraged the Abbé Alary and the young cartographer-to-be, Jean Baptiste Bourguignon d'Anville (1697–1782), perhaps the greatest geographical author of the eighteenth century. As a philologist, he remarked on the astonishing progress the French language had made, in its refinement and conscious purification from 1630 to 1670. The abbé was a free-thinker, for a man ostensibly of the cloth: Helvétius quoted his remark that, if all the good and all the evil done in the name of religion were weighed together, the evil would preponderate.

His great work was his Description de France, one of the secondary sources used by Edward Gibbon for his Decline and Fall of the Roman Empire.

Louis was born in Charleville-Mézières, the son of Pierre Dufour, seigneur de Longuevue et Goisel, a Gentilhomme de Normandie and governor of Charleville. His elder brother, who had been expected to succeed to the title and was already a field marshal awarded the Order of St. Louis, was killed at the battle of Ramillies, 1706.

After his death in Paris a volume of Longueruana was published, based on the recollections of a devoted amanuensis who had transcribed Longuerue's savant conversations. In 1769 a further selection of fugitive pieces from among his papers was published.
