= Montcy-Notre-Dame =

- Commune
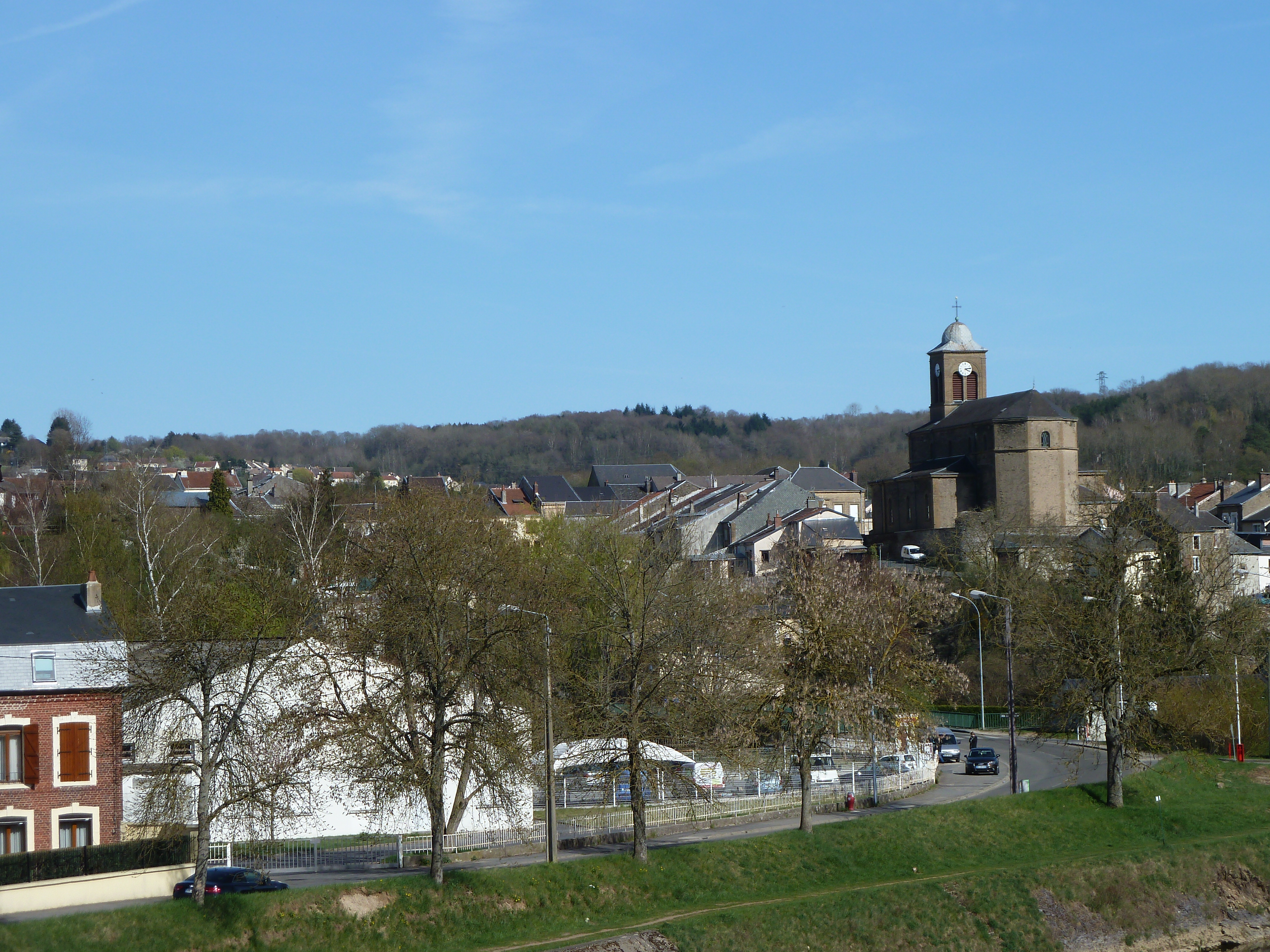
- The church and surroundings in Montcy-Notre-Dame

- Coat of arms
- Location of Montcy-Notre-Dame
- Location within France Location within Grand Est
- Coordinates: 49°46′32″N 4°44′37″E
- Country: France
- Region: Grand Est
- Department: Ardennes
- Arrondissement: Charleville-Mézières
- Canton: Charleville-Mézières-3
- Intercommunality: CA Ardenne Métropole

Government
  - Mayor (2020–2026): Christophe Laurent
- Area^{1}: 6.13 km^{2} (2.37 sq mi)
- Elevation: 160 m (520 ft)
- Highest elevation: 276 m (906 ft)
- Lowest elevation: 133 m (436 ft)
- Population (2023): 1,535
  - Density: 250/km^{2} (649/sq mi)
- Time zone: UTC+01:00 (CET)
  - Summer (DST): UTC+02:00 (CEST)
- INSEE/Postal code: 08298 /08090
- ^{1} French Land Register data, which excludes lakes, ponds, glaciers > 1 km^{2} (0.386 sq mi or 247 acres) and river estuaries.

Montcy-Notre-Dame (French pronunciation: [mɔ̃si nɔtʁ dam]) is a commune in the Ardennes department and Grand Est region of north-eastern France.

== Population ==
Historical population
Year	Pop.	±% p.a.
1968	1,203	—
1975	1,582	+3.99%
1982	1,516	−0.61%
1990	1,419	−0.82%
1999	1,482	+0.48%
2007	1,536	+0.45%
2012	1,607	+0.91%
2017	1,600	−0.09%
2023	1,535	−0.69%
Source: INSEE

== Personalities ==
- David Hallou (born 1966), former professional footballer

== See also ==
- Communes of the Ardennes department
- Castle of the fairies
