= Charleville-Mézières =

- Prefecture and commune
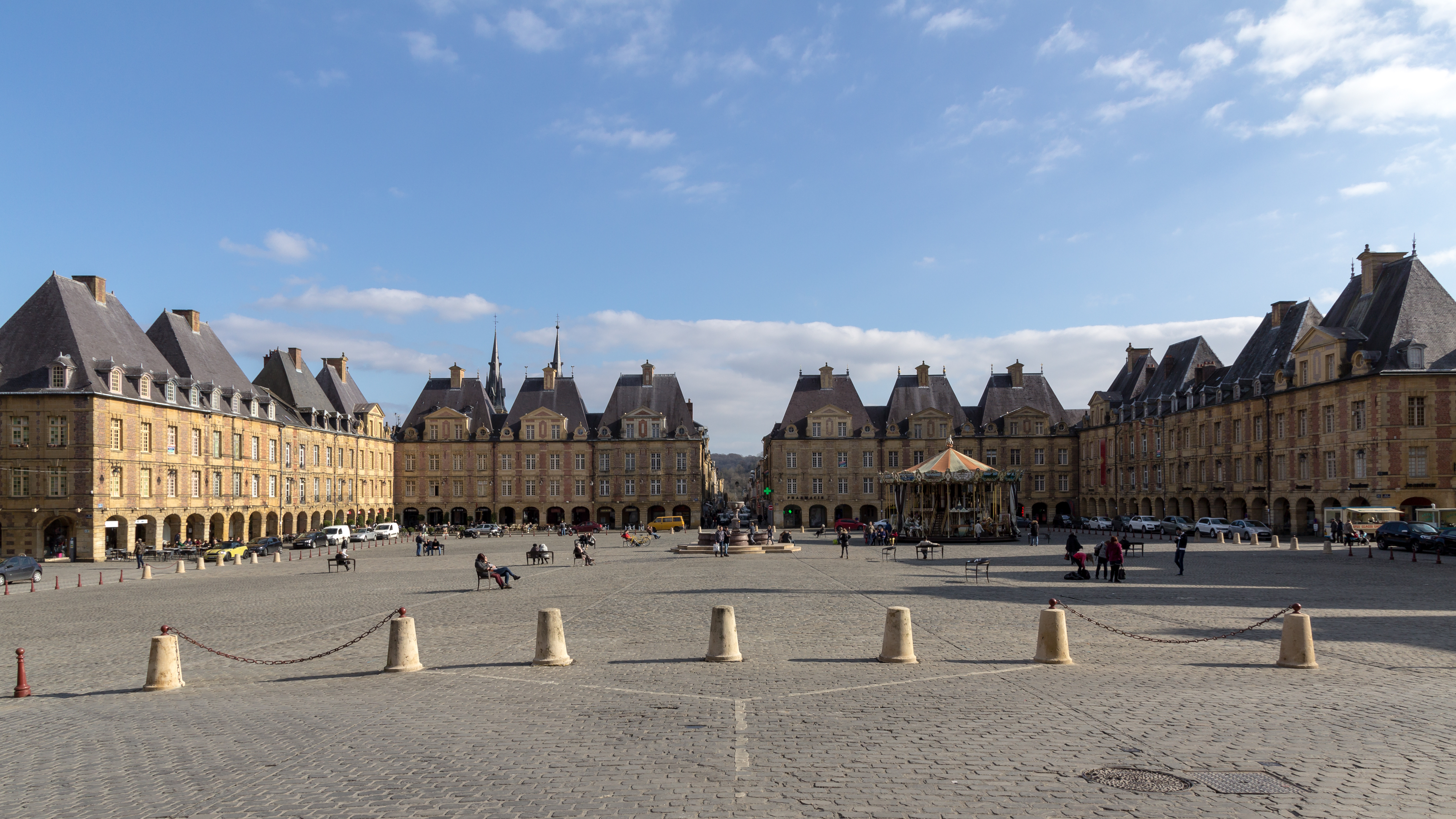
- Place Ducale

- Flag Coat of arms
- Location of Charleville-Mézières
- Location within France Location within Grand Est
- Coordinates: 49°46′19″N 4°42′58″E
- Country: France
- Region: Grand Est
- Department: Ardennes
- Arrondissement: Charleville-Mézières
- Canton: Charleville-Mézières-1, 2, 3 and 4
- Intercommunality: CA Ardenne Métropole

Government
  - Mayor (2020–2026): Boris Ravignon
- Area^{1}: 31.44 km^{2} (12.14 sq mi)
- Elevation: 148 m (486 ft)
- Highest elevation: 323 m (1,060 ft)
- Lowest elevation: 133 m (436 ft)
- Population (2023): 45,560
  - Density: 1,449/km^{2} (3,753/sq mi)
- Demonym: French: Carolomacérien or Carolomacérienne
- Time zone: UTC+01:00 (CET)
  - Summer (DST): UTC+02:00 (CEST)
- INSEE/Postal code: 08105 /08000
- ^{1} French Land Register data, which excludes lakes, ponds, glaciers > 1 km^{2} (0.386 sq mi or 247 acres) and river estuaries.

Charleville-Mézières (French pronunciation: [ʃaʁləvil mezjɛʁ]) is a commune of northern France and the prefecture of the Ardennes department, in the Grand Est region. Charleville-Mézières is located on the banks of the river Meuse.

== History ==
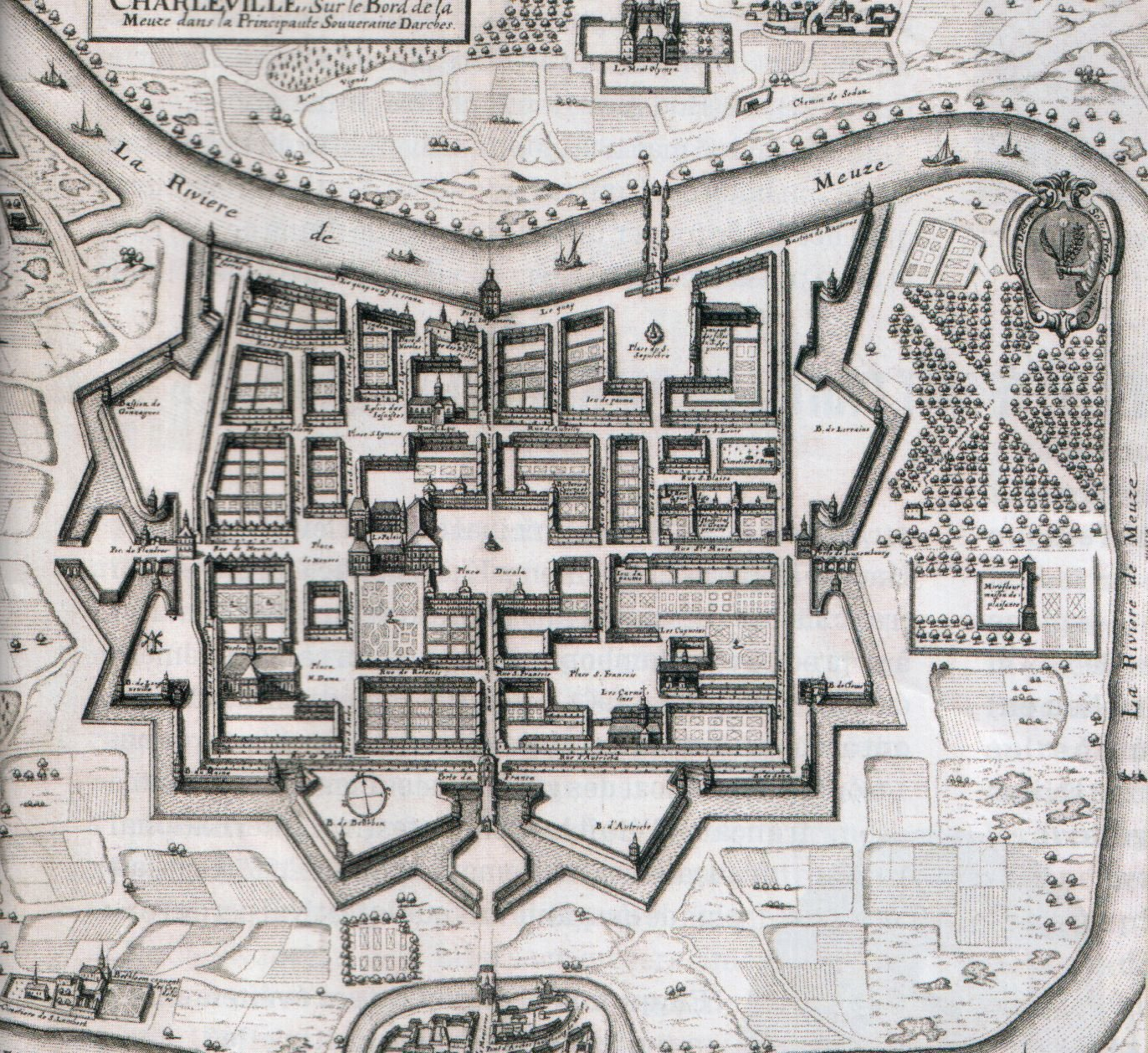
Charleville in 1625

Charleville and Mézières were originally separate communities on opposite banks of the Meuse, about 1.2 km (0.75 mi) from one another.

Charleville was founded by Charles Gonzaga, the 8th duke of Mantua, in 1606. Its inhabitants were known as Carolopolitans (Carolopolitains or Carolopolitaines). It was prosperous from the 17th century, although its fortifications were dismantled under Louis XIV in 1687 and it passed into French hands in 1708. It was plundered by the Prussians in 1815. France's royal armaments factory was formerly located there and gave its name to the Charleville musket, before being relocated and divided between Tulle and Châtellerault. In the 19th century, the city continued to produce arms through private firms, as well as nails, hardware, wine, spirits, coal, iron, and slate. It boasted a spacious port, a theatre, a large public library, and a museum of natural history.

The name Mézières derives from the Latin maceriae, meaning 'ramparts'.

The inhabitants of Mézières were known as Macerians (Macériens or Macériennes).

By the mid-19th century, the two towns were linked by a suspension bridge. It was occupied by the German Empire in the First World War and by Nazi Germany in World War II - the town served as the center of the Oberste Heeresleitung (OHL) for 26 days during World War I. The present commune was established in 1966, the year after another commune, Le Theux, had been merged into Mézières. The entire resultant commune has a population of about 51,000.

The Hôtel de Ville was completed in July 1933.

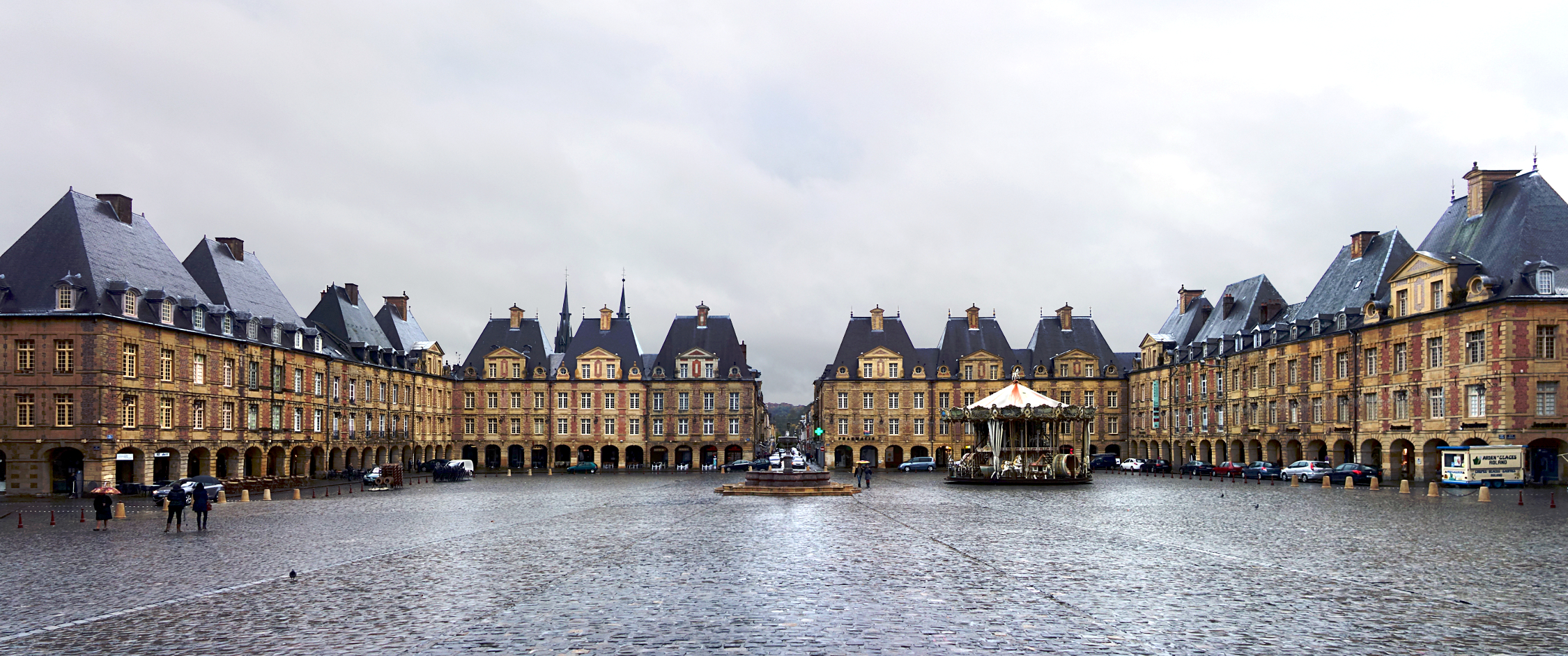
Panorama of Place Ducale, laid out in 1606

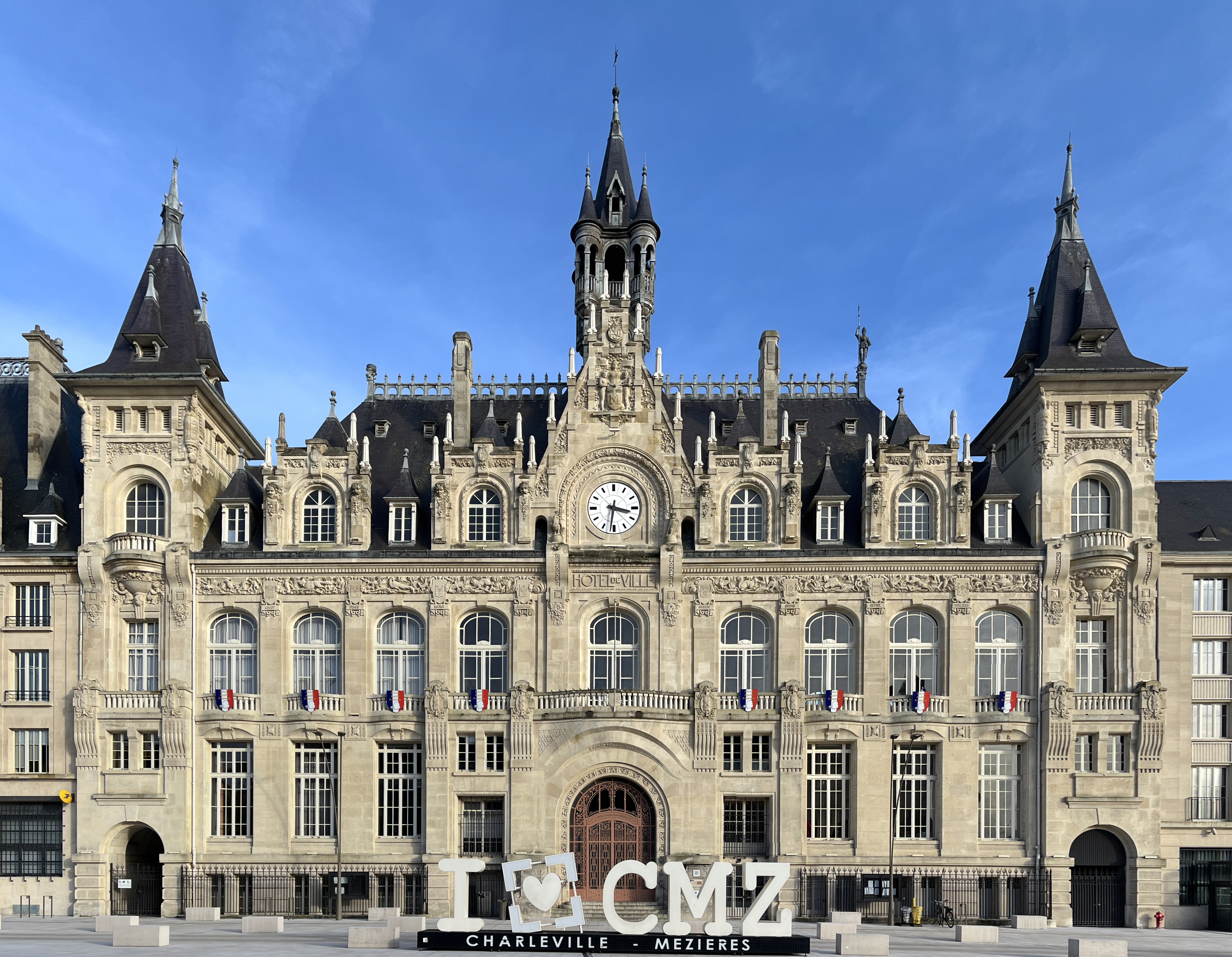
The Hôtel de Ville

== Climate ==
With an annual average of 10 °C (50 °F), Charleville-Mézières is generally the coolest city of France. Winters are long, cold and gloomy while summers are interchangeably warm or hot but sometimes, even in the middle of July, night temperatures can drop below 5 °C (41 °F). Under the Köppen-Geiger climate classification, Charleville-Mézières features a temperate oceanic climate (Cfb) with strong continental influences (Dfb). The climate is vastly affected by the low mountain Ardennes range nearby. The proximity results in moisture being trapped and excessive precipitation occurs as a result when compared to other parts of northern France. Temperature inversion is also common, which results in strong cold snaps compared to the oceanic climates further west. This results in overnight temperatures below −10 °C (14 °F) happening during most winters as the cold air descends at night. Similar patterns replicate year round, causing Charleville-Mezières to have cooler summer nights than Nordic coastal areas near the Arctic Circle. The intermittent frosts in May and September also result in a short growing season.

Climate data for Charleville-Mézières, elevation: 145 m (476 ft) (1991-2020 normals, extremes 1990-present)
Month	Jan	Feb	Mar	Apr	May	Jun	Jul	Aug	Sep	Oct	Nov	Dec	Year
Record high °C (°F)	15.0 (59.0)	21.7 (71.1)	24.4 (75.9)	28.1 (82.6)	31.4 (88.5)	38.8 (101.8)	39.2 (102.6)	37.5 (99.5)	34.4 (93.9)	27.7 (81.9)	19.9 (67.8)	15.7 (60.3)	39.2 (102.6)
Mean daily maximum °C (°F)	5.6 (42.1)	6.9 (44.4)	11.3 (52.3)	15.3 (59.5)	19.0 (66.2)	22.1 (71.8)	24.1 (75.4)	23.9 (75.0)	20.0 (68.0)	15.0 (59.0)	9.3 (48.7)	6.1 (43.0)	14.9 (58.8)
Daily mean °C (°F)	2.7 (36.9)	3.1 (37.6)	6.2 (43.2)	9.1 (48.4)	12.8 (55.0)	16.0 (60.8)	18.0 (64.4)	17.6 (63.7)	14.1 (57.4)	10.4 (50.7)	6.1 (43.0)	3.3 (37.9)	9.9 (49.8)
Mean daily minimum °C (°F)	−0.3 (31.5)	−0.6 (30.9)	1.0 (33.8)	2.8 (37.0)	6.6 (43.9)	9.9 (49.8)	11.8 (53.2)	11.2 (52.2)	8.2 (46.8)	5.8 (42.4)	2.8 (37.0)	0.4 (32.7)	5.0 (41.0)
Record low °C (°F)	−17.5 (0.5)	−16.7 (1.9)	−13.8 (7.2)	−8.5 (16.7)	−4.4 (24.1)	−2.4 (27.7)	1.7 (35.1)	0.4 (32.7)	−3.4 (25.9)	−6.7 (19.9)	−11.8 (10.8)	−16.4 (2.5)	−17.5 (0.5)
Average precipitation mm (inches)	100.4 (3.95)	78.3 (3.08)	68.6 (2.70)	56.6 (2.23)	67.6 (2.66)	66.8 (2.63)	72.3 (2.85)	74.4 (2.93)	63.4 (2.50)	80.1 (3.15)	83.8 (3.30)	116.1 (4.57)	928.4 (36.55)
Average precipitation days (≥ 1.0 mm)	13.3	11.3	11.1	9.2	10.2	9.8	10.0	10.0	9.1	11.2	12.8	14.0	132.1
Average snowy days	3.0	5.6	3.0	0.8	0.0	0.0	0.0	0.0	0.0	0.0	1.3	4.3	18.0
Average relative humidity (%)	89	82	76	70	73	73	71	75	79	86	89	90	79
Average dew point °C (°F)	1 (34)	0 (32)	2 (36)	4 (39)	8 (46)	12 (54)	13 (55)	13 (55)	10 (50)	8 (46)	5 (41)	3 (37)	7 (44)
Mean monthly sunshine hours	50.4	69.0	128.1	176.7	197.3	202.9	214.2	198.6	152.5	96.8	48.4	40.7	1,575.5
Source 1: Meteociel (snowy days 1981-2010)
Source 2: Time and Date

== Population ==
In the table below, data for 1962 and earlier refer to the old commune of Charleville, before the merger with Étion, Mézières, Mohon and Montcy-Saint-Pierre.

Historical population

Year	Pop.	±% p.a.
1793	7,240	—
1800	7,724	+0.93%
1806	8,430	+1.47%
1821	8,320	−0.09%
1831	7,773	−0.68%
1836	8,878	+2.69%
1841	9,875	+2.15%
1846	9,353	−1.08%
1851	9,162	−0.41%
1866	11,244	+1.37%
1872	12,676	+2.02%
1876	13,759	+2.07%
1881	16,185	+3.30%
1886	16,906	+0.88%
1891	17,390	+0.57%
1896	17,805	+0.47%
1901	18,772	+1.06%
1906	20,702	+1.98%

Year	Pop.	±% p.a.
1911	22,654	+1.82%
1921	21,689	−0.43%
1926	22,634	+0.86%
1931	22,708	+0.07%
1936	22,557	−0.13%
1946	20,193	−1.10%
1954	22,536	+1.38%
1962	24,668	+1.14%
1968	55,543	+14.49%
1975	60,176	+1.15%
1982	58,667	−0.36%
1990	57,008	−0.36%
1999	55,490	−0.30%
2007	51,070	−1.03%
2012	49,759	−0.52%
2017	46,428	−1.38%
2023	45,560	−0.31%

Source: EHESS and INSEE (1968-2023)

== Culture ==
Puppetry is an important part of the cultural life of Charleville-Mézières, which is called the "World Capital of Puppetry Arts". An international puppet festival has been held there every three years since 1961, and became a biennial event in 2011. The town is also home to the world headquarters of UNIMA as well as the International Puppetry Institute (French: Institut International de la Marionnette), which is housed in a historic building featuring a giant automaton of a puppeteer who performs a puppet show every hour on the hour. The École Nationale Supérieure des Arts de la Marionnette (ESNAM), a college which offers a higher education in puppetry, is also situated in Charleville-Mézières.

The poet Arthur Rimbaud (1854–1891) was born in Charleville. The Rimbaud museum is located in the old water mill (Le Vieux Moulin) to the north of the town.

== Transport ==
The local network of public buses within the Ardenne Métropole, TAC, is operated by RATP Dev. The Charleville-Mézières railway station offers connections to Paris (by TGV), Reims, Lille, Metz and regional destinations.

== Sport ==
OFC Charleville represent the town at association football. Étoile de Charleville-Mézières is a basketball club.

== Notable people ==
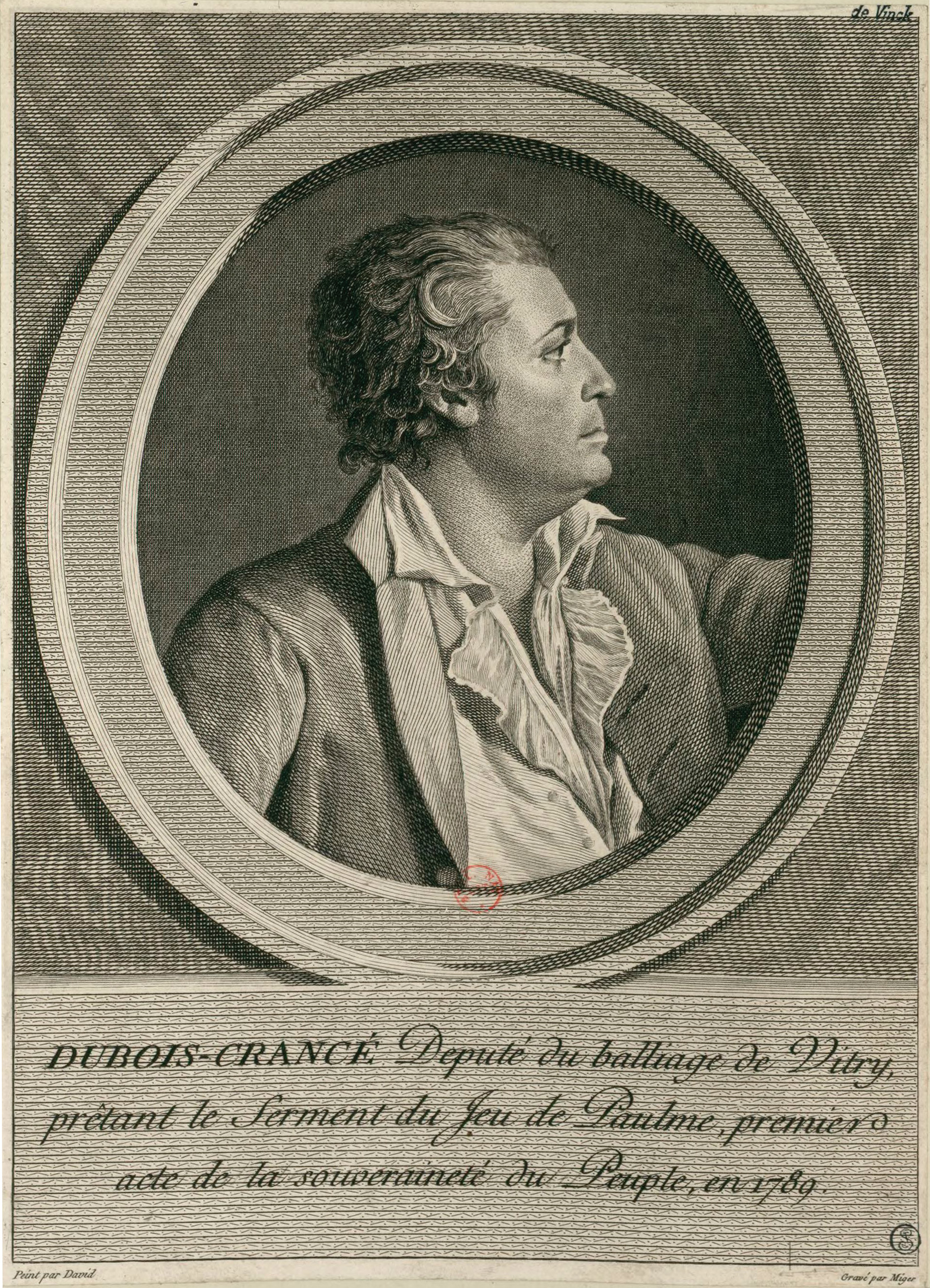
Edmond Louis Alexis Dubois-Crancé, 1791

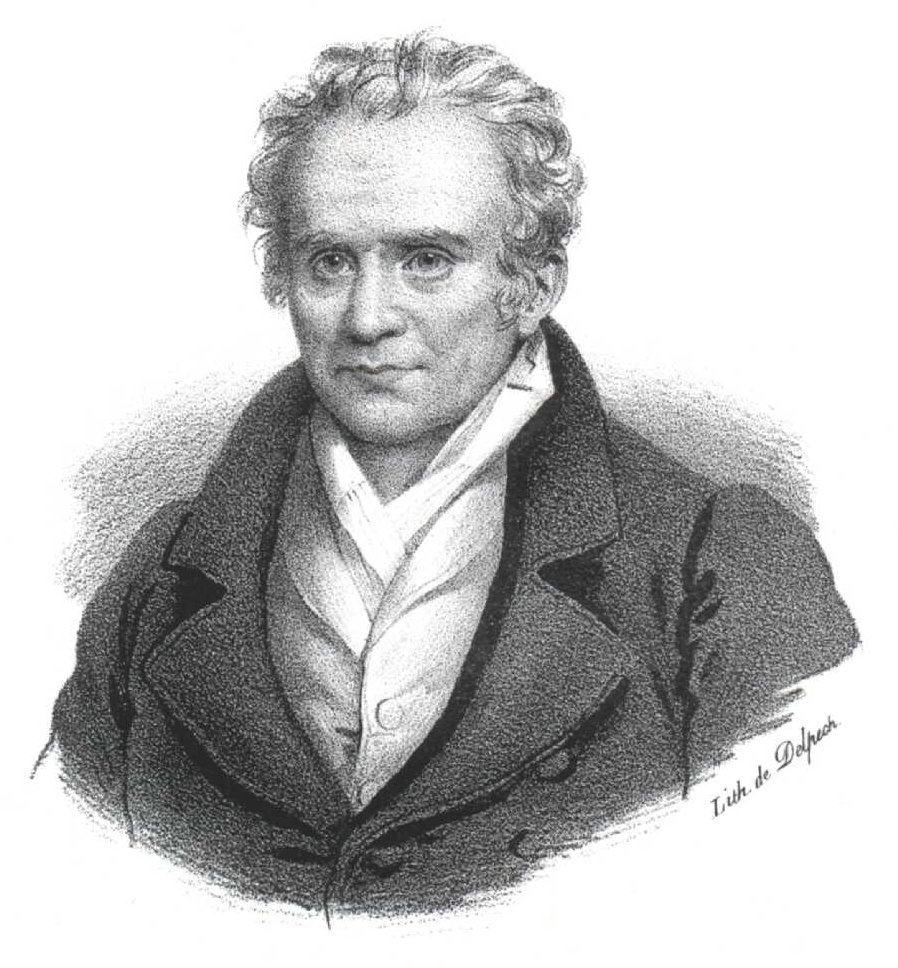
Gaspard Monge

- Rheinart d'Arfeuille (1840–1902), colonial administrator and explorer of French Indochina
- Louise Bellocq (1919–1968), French writer, winner of the 1960 Prix Femina, was born in Charleville
- Olivier Brochard (born 1967), former football player
- Antoine Louis Dugès (1797–1838), obstetrician and naturalist
- François Habeneck (1781–1849), violinist born in Mézières
- Adolphe-Hippolyte Couveley (1802–1867), painter born in Charleville
- Edmond Louis Alexis Dubois-Crancé (1747–1814), general, French revolutionary, minister of war, 12th President of the National Convention.
- Louis Dufour (1652–1733), the abbé of Longuerue, was born in Charleville.
- Jean Nicolas Pierre Hachette (1769–1834), mathematician born in Mézières.
- Henri Mialaret (1855–1919), sailor
- Gaspard Monge (1746–1818), mathematician, taught at the École royale du génie de Mézières.
- Étienne Riché (1883–1934), politician and banker, twice under-secretary of state and deputy for the Ardennes, born in Charleville
- Arthur Rimbaud (1854–1891), the French poet, was born in Charleville.
- Félix Savart (1791–1841), physicist and mathematician born in Mézières
- Louis Tirman (1837–1899), lawyer and civil servant, Governor General of Algeria from 1881 to 1891
- Natalis de Wailly (1805–1886), 19th-century historian and palaeographer born in Charleville

== International relations ==
Charleville-Mézières is twinned with:

- Dülmen, Germany
- Euskirchen, Germany
- Nordhausen, Germany
- Nevers, France
- Mantua, Italy
- Tolosa, Spain

== See also ==
- Pierre Terrail, seigneur de Bayard
- Clément-Bayard
- Communes of the Ardennes department
- Jet Lag: The Game - Charleville Mézières was the starting location of seasons 3, 7, and 15 of the show.
