= Adolphe-Hippolyte Couveley =

French painter and lithographer (1802–1867)

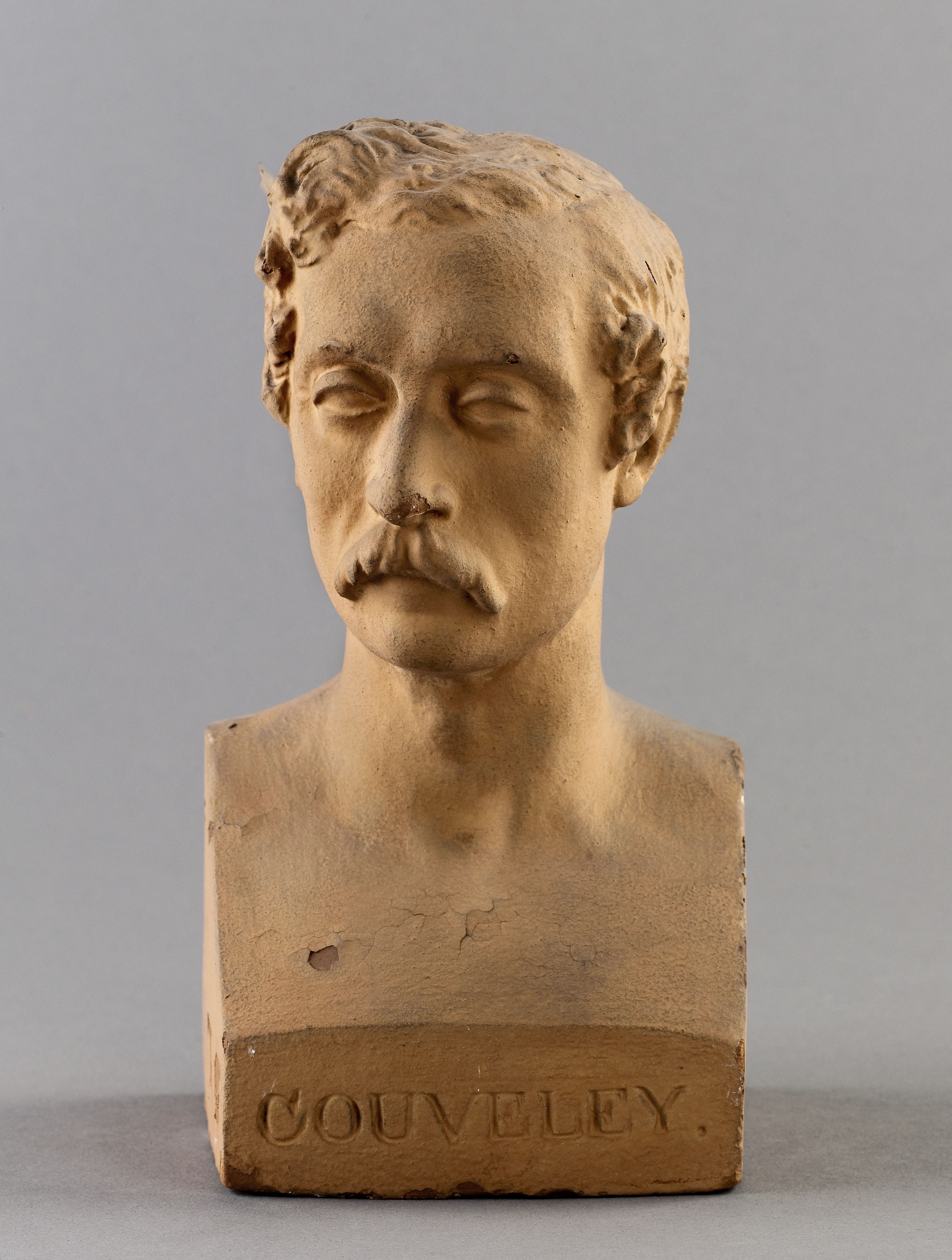

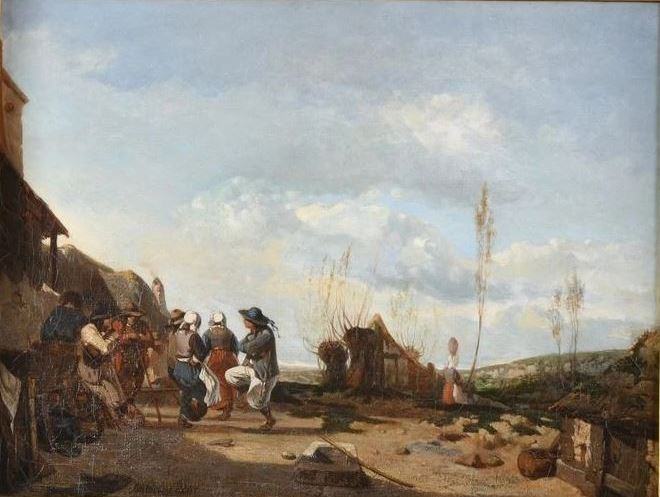
Village Dances

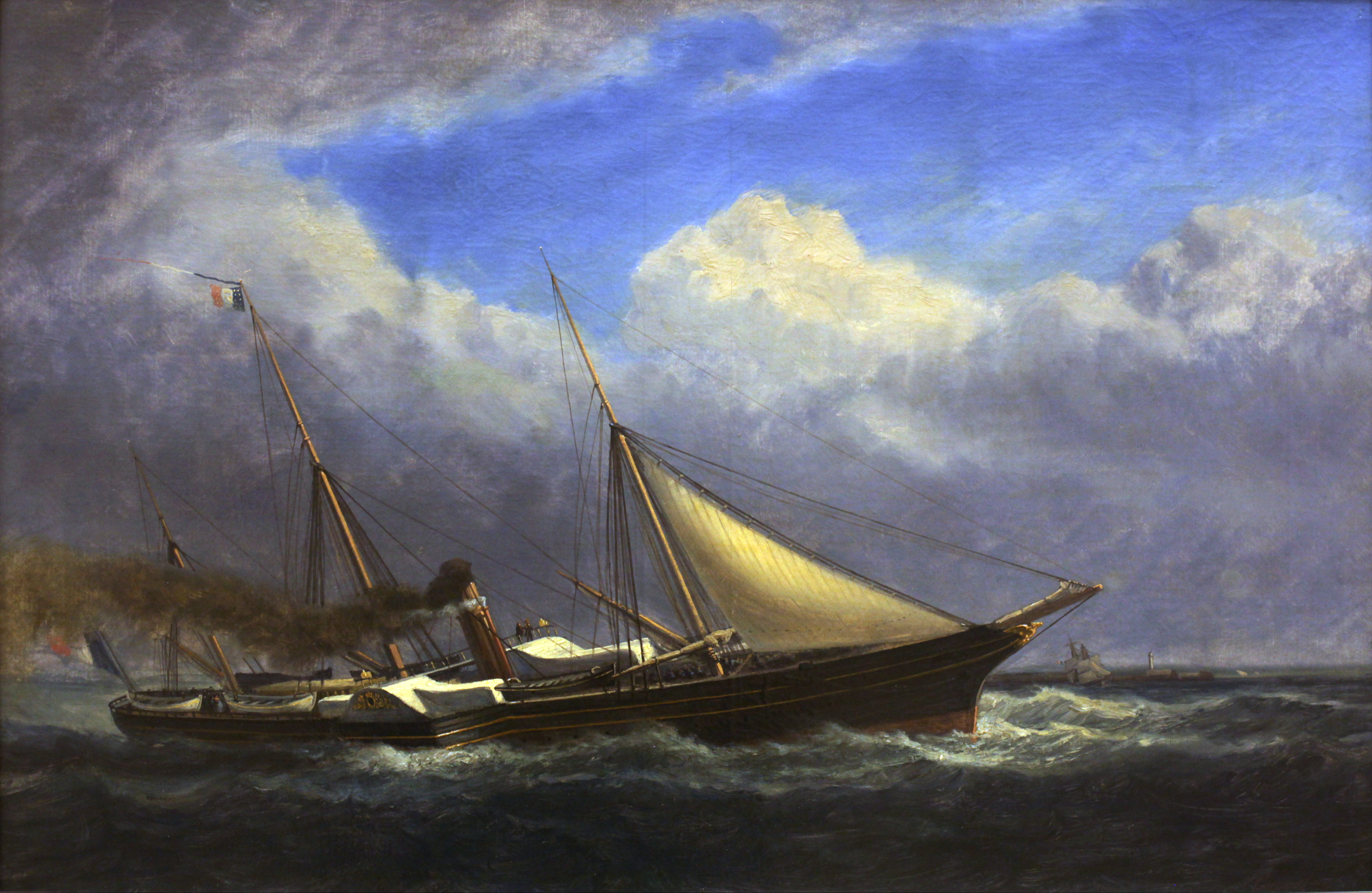
Imperial Yacht, L'Aigle

Adolphe-Hippolyte Couveley, originally Couvelet (16 November 1802, Charleville-Mézières – 27 April 1867, Le Havre) was a French painter and lithographer who specialized in maritime subjects.

== Biography ==
His father, Jean-Baptiste Couvelet, was a well known painter and provided him with his first lessons. He had his debut at the Salon of 1834. This was followed by a trip to Brittany and London in 1835. While in England, he was taken by a bit of Anglomania and began spelling his last name with a "y". The paintings he displayed at the Salon of Dijon, in 1837, were the first to be signed in that style. His children would retain the spelling.

In 1845, the city of Le Havre asked him to help organize the new city museum, and he became its first curator. While serving in that role, he met the young painter, Eugène Boudin, and became his sponsor. In 1851, he was able to obtain a grant from Le Havre that would enable Boudin to study in Paris. In 1859, he was named a Knight in the Legion of Honor.

Despite these successes, his paintings always fared poorly. One had been refused at the Salon of 1841. His "View of Marseille", exhibited at the Salon of 1861, was scathingly dismissed by the painter and critic, Charles-Olivier Merson. After that, his financial situation worsened considerably. On one occasion, he was caught putting his signature on some of Boudin's works. When he died, a large part of his debt was paid by selling the paintings he had loaned to the museum in Le Havre, depriving it of much of its collection.

His works may be seen at the Musée d'art moderne André-Malraux and the Musée National de la Marine.
