= Italian frigate Giuseppe Garibaldi =

Italian frigate

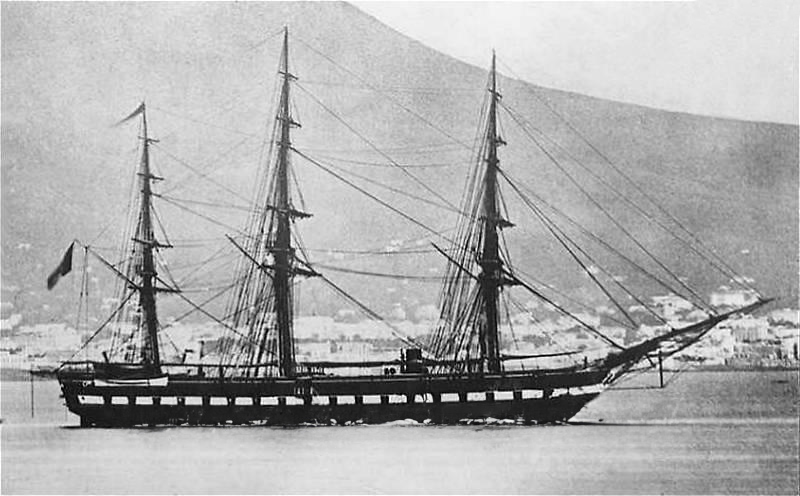
- The Garibaldi in the Bay of Naples

History

Naples
- Name: Borbone
- Namesake: House of Bourbon
- Builder: Royal shipyard, Castellammare di Stabia
- Cost: 2,363,000 lira
- Laid down: 1 August 1857
- Launched: 18 January 1860
- Commissioned: 10 July 1860
- Fate: Transferred to the Kingdom of Italy, 7 September 1860

Italy
- Name: Giuseppe Garibaldi
- Namesake: Giuseppe Garibaldi
- Commissioned: 1860
- Decommissioned: 1870
- Recommissioned: 1872
- Decommissioned: 1894
- Fate: Disarmed, converted to a hospital ship and renamed Saati, 1893; Sold for scrapping, 1899

General characteristics
- Type: Screw frigate
- Displacement: 3,680 long tons (3,739 t) standard; 3,980 long tons (4,044 t) full load
- Length: 68.20 m (223 ft 9 in) o/a; 65.9 m (216 ft 2 in) p/p
- Beam: 15.2 m (49 ft 10 in)
- Draught: 7.1 m (23 ft 4 in)
- Propulsion: 4 × Coal-fired boilers; 1 × 1,175 ihp (876 kW) Maudslay, Sons and Field horizontal cylinder steam engine; 1 × Screw propeller (retractable); 370 tons fuel
- Sail plan: Full-rigged ship; 2,725 m^{2} (29,330 sq ft) sail area
- Speed: 11 knots (20 km/h; 13 mph)
- Range: 1,800 nmi (3,300 km; 2,100 mi) at 7 knots (13 km/h; 8.1 mph)
- Complement: 658
- Armament: As built: 8 × 160-pounder rifles; 12 × 72-pounder smoothbore guns; 26 × 68-pounder smoothbore guns; 4 × 80-pounder smoothbore guns; from 1861: 1 × 117-pdr smoothbore cannon; 2 × 30-pdr smoothbore guns; 10 × 60-pdr rifles; 24 × 30-pdr smoothbore guns; 18 × 80-pdr smoothbore guns; from 1866: 16 × 200 mm (7.9 in) smoothbore guns; 12 × 160 mm (6.3 in) smoothbore guns; 4 × 160 mm (6.3 in) rifles; from 1871: 8 × 160 mm (6.3 in) rifles; 4 × 80 mm (3.1 in) cannon; 4 × 75 mm (3.0 in) cannon
- Armour: None

The Italian frigate Giuseppe Garibaldi was a steam frigate of the Regia Marina of Italy. It was the first ship to be named after General Giuseppe Garibaldi.

== Service ==
She was laid down in the royal shipyard at Castellammare di Stabia on 1 April 1857 and launched in January 1860, entering service in the Real Marina of the Kingdom of the Two Sicilies on 10 July 1860, under the name Borbone.

In August 1860 she reached Messina to assist other naval ships based there to hold up Garibaldi's advance, exchanging fire with the former Bourbon ship Veloce, which had been captured by the Garibaldian forces and renamed Tüköry after Lajos Tüköry, a Hungarian official who had been killed on 6 July 1860 at Palermo while taking part in the Expedition of the Thousand. On 7 September 1860 Garibaldi issued a decree that all the ships and arsenals of the former Bourbon fleet were to be incorporated into the King of Italy's fleet and two days after the Borbone (now renamed the Giuseppe Garibaldi) entered the Sardinian fleet it took part in the siege of Gaeta, the last Bourbon stronghold. She was incorporated into the Regia Marina on its creation in 1861 and was due for decommissioning in 1870, but was instead refitted after the Battle of Lissa due to a scarcity of available naval ships, with her armament improved, her superstructure lowered and her sails and rigging removed, at a cost of £200,000.

On 16 November 1872 she left Naples for a circumnavigation of the globe, stopping at Gibraltar and Rio de Janeiro, rounding the Cape of Good Hope, and in 1873 visiting Australia, the Fiji Islands and Japan. After stopping there for around two months, she visited San Francisco and several ports in Mexico and Central and South America. She then rounded Cape Horn, stopped at Montevideo and set off for Italy, reaching Spezia on 22 October 1874.

She was reclassified as a corvette in 1877 and the following year her boilers were replaced. She made a second circumnavigation between 1879 and 1882, defending Italian communities in Latin America. Due to the Urabi revolt and the subsequent Anglo-French blockade of Egypt, she took 135 Italin and Austrian refugees from Port Said and transited through the Suez Canal in spite of the blockade. Future commander of the Italian navy, Paolo Thaon di Revel was on board during this voyage. The voyage concluded with Garibaldi's arrival in Naples, with the ship having travelled 42,000 nautical miles over three years and three months at sea.

She was modified in 1883 and stationed in the Red Sea, taking part in the defence of Massawa before being disarmed and converted into a hospital ship in 1893, upon which she was renamed Saati to free up the name for the new armoured cruiser then being planned. She was finally decommissioned on 16 December 1894 and broken up in 1899.
