= Ouvrage La Ferté =

Ouvrage in Maginot Line, Ardennes, France

- Part of Maginot Line
- North-East France
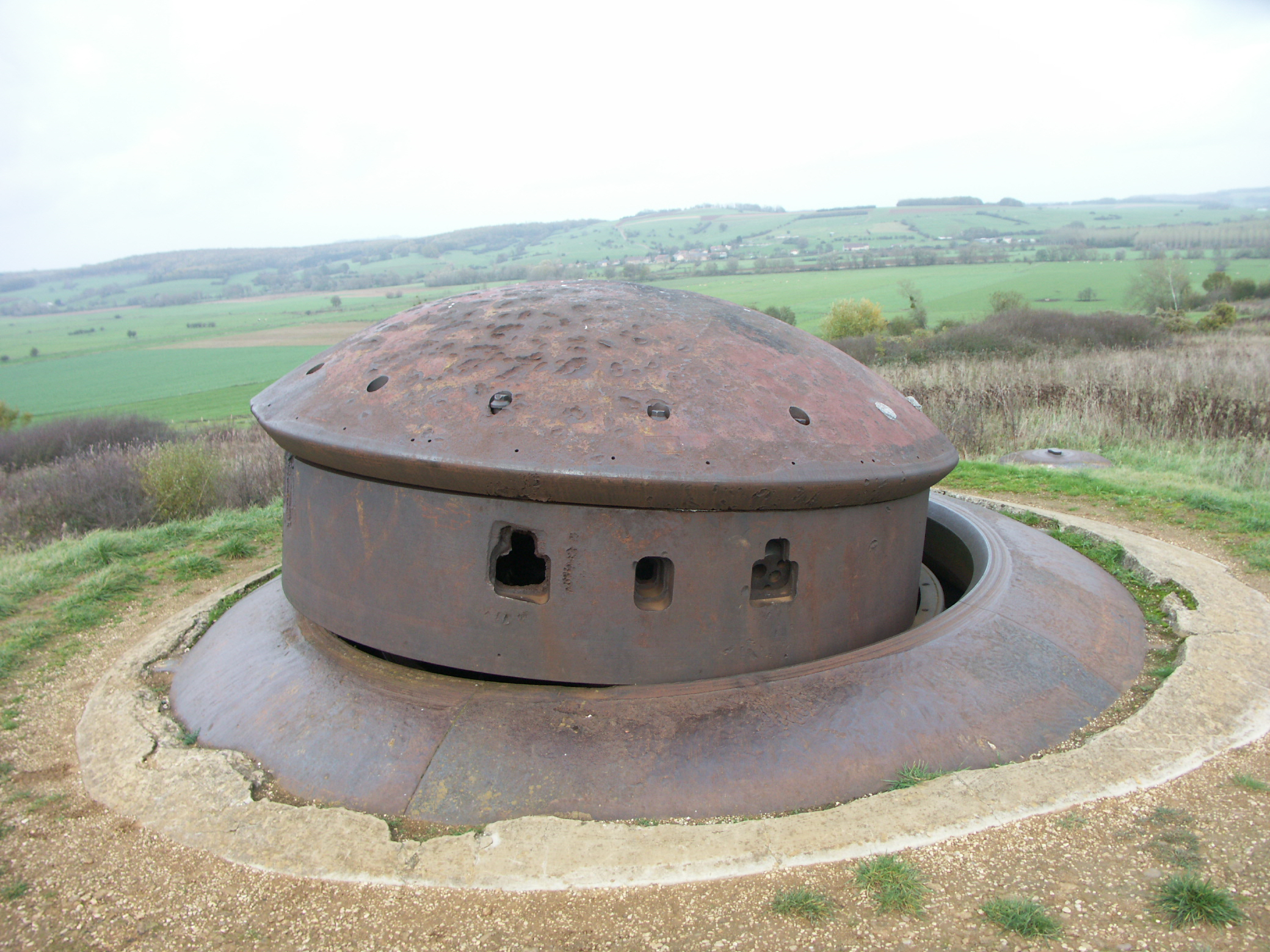
- Mixed arms turret, La Ferté

Site information
- Owner: Ministry of Defense
- Controlled by: France
- Open to the public: Yes
- Condition: Preserved as a war memorial

Location
- Coordinates: 49.58482°N 5.23293°E

Site history
- Built by: CORF
- Materials: Concrete, steel, deep excavation
- Battles/wars: Battle of France

Monument historique
- Official name: Ouvrage de la Ferté
- Designated: 1980
- Reference no.: PA00078437
- Denomination: Fortification

Ouvrage La Ferté, also known as Ouvrage Villy-La Ferté, is a petit ouvrage of the Maginot Line, located in the Fortified Sector of Montmédy, facing Belgium. The ouvrage lies between the towns of Villy and La Ferté-sur-Chiers. It possesses two combat blocks linked by an underground gallery. The westernmost position in its sector, it was a comparatively weakly armed fortification in an exposed position that left it vulnerable to isolation and attack. After a sustained attack during the Battle of France, the position was overwhelmed by German forces and was destroyed with its entire garrison killed. The fighting at La Ferté was the heaviest of any position in the Maginot Line. It is preserved as a war memorial.

== Design and construction ==
La Ferté is one of four positions in the so-called Tête du Pont de Montmédy ("Montmédy Bridgehead"), a salient in the French defensive lines along the Belgian border. The isolated area was one of the "New Fronts" to the west of the main Maginot Line, created to defend against the increased threat of a German advance through Belgium. The New Front positions suffered from restricted funding, as well as discontinuity in the fortification lines. Large distances between fortifications compared to earlier portions of the Line made mutual support between ouvrages difficult.

The site was approved in 1934, under the supervision of CORF (Commission d'Organisation des Régions Fortifiées), the Maginot Line's design and construction agency. Work by the contractor Chanel of Antibes began in 1935 at a cost of 14.5 million francs. A second phase was planned to add an artillery block. This was scaled back to a pair of separate artillery casemates. A separate entrance block was proposed in April 1940, linking to the casemates. As the initial confrontation with Germany was already underway, it was too late to be built, with a projected construction time of 18 months.

Compared to earlier Maginot positions, the La Ferté site suffered from a number of design and construction deficiencies. The site contours around Block 2 required a great deal of rubble fill to cover the sides of the block. This rubble had not yet stabilised by the spring of 1940 and could be dislodged by artillery fire. Block 2 suffered from restricted fields of fire to the west and south-west, which were covered only by an automatic rifle cloche. The nearby road ran in a cutting that could not be swept by direct fire. Since La Ferté lacked mortars, the road was dead ground.

The separate artillery casemates were not habitable for any extended period and lacked close-in defences. With unusually large gun embrasures measuring 1.3 metres (4.3 ft) by 1.7 metres (5.6 ft), they afforded little protection to their crews against accurate fire, while coverage from the main ouvrage was poor.

== Description ==
La Ferté is a petit ouvrage. (Note: English-language sources use the French term ouvrage as the preferred term for the Maginot positions, in preference to "fort", a term usually reserved for older fortifications with passive defenses in the form of walls and ditches. The literal translation of ouvrage in the sense of a fortification in English is "work." A gros ouvrage is a large fortification with a significant artillery component, while a petit ouvrage is smaller, with lighter arms.) It is located immediately to the west of the Chiers River, with two semi-buried reinforced concrete combat blocks containing the position's armament and observation posts, linked by a deep underground gallery.

- Block 1: infantry/entry block with one automatic rifle cloche (GFM-B), one observation cloche (VDP), two mixed-arm cloches (AM), one twin machine gun embrasure and one machine gun/47 mm anti-tank gun (JM/AC47) embrasure.
- Block 2: infantry block with one retractable mixed-arm turret, one AM cloche, one GFM-B cloche and one GFM-B observation cloche. Block 2 was the principal focus of the German assault.

A separate entry block was planned, adjacent to the Villy Est casemate. The underground gallery system at La Ferté is simple, limited to a gallery linking the two blocks, which were initially designed to function as separate units with separate generating plants and ventilation facilities in each block. The 275-metre (902 ft) gallery contained some shared facilities, such as a kitchen, a laundry and an infirmary, at an average depth of 24 metres (79 ft) below the surface. The gallery's small size made it most useful as a link, rather than as the garrison, magazine, command post and long-term shelter afforded by the gallery systems of most Maginot ouvrages. Unlike most ouvrages, La Ferté's living spaces were near the surface in the two combat blocks. A more typical Maginot position would have such spaces under 30 metres (98 ft) of earth or rock cover. Unlike many Maginot positions, the main drain at La Ferté was not configured as an emergency exit. The mixed-arm turret used on Block 2 was known to be mechanically trouble-prone, and La Ferté's turret particularly so.

=== Casemates ===
A number of small blockhouses are associated with La Ferté, as well as unconnected casemates:

- Casemate de Margut: Double block with one JM/AC47 embrasure, one JM embrasure, two AM cloches and one GFM-B cloche, about 2 kilometres (1.2 mi) to the east-southeast on the far side of the Chiers.
- Casemate de Villy Ouest: Artillery block with one 75 mm gun.
- Casemate de Villy Est: Artillery block with one 75 mm gun.

The Villy gun casemates are close to Block 2, directly adjacent to the 1940 road. They replaced the planned 75 mm gun turret block. The casemates are not connected to each other or to the main ouvrage, a weakness that influenced the 1940 combat action.

=== Villy ===
The village of Villy lies about one kilometre to the north-west of ouvrage La Ferté. Villy itself was fortified with more than a dozen blockhouses, along with networks of barbed wire and tank obstacles. The blockhouses were primarily prepared, reinforced firing positions and did not necessarily possess fixed armament.

== Manning ==
The 1940 manning of the ouvrage under the command of Lieutenant Bourguignon comprised 97 men and 3 officers of the 155th Fortress Infantry Regiment (155th RIF) and the 169th Position Artillery Regiment (169th RAP). The units were under the umbrella of the Second Army, Army Group 1. The Casernement de Montmédy provided peacetime above-ground barracks and support services to La Ferté and other fortifications in the area.

Lieutenant Bourguignon had exchanged commands with Lieutenant Guiard on 20 March 1940, Guiard taking Bourguignon's former position at the casemate of Thonne-le-Thil. Bourguignon was assisted by Sub-Lieutenant Thouémont, who commanded Block 2. Thouémont, who had been previously posted to a machine gun battalion in the 149th and 132nd RIF, lacked specific training on Maginot systems. He replaced Captain André, a reservist and mayor of Villy, who had been promoted. Bourguignon was responsible for command of Block 1, as well as for overall command. Compared to similar positions, La Ferté was understaffed with officers.

== Strategic situation ==
The Second Army was commanded by General Charles Huntziger, who was responsible for the defence of the Ardennes region of the frontier, including the Fortified Sector of Montmédy. The sector was composed of two parts. The eastern portion was defended by the Maginot positions of La Ferté, Chesnois, Thonnelle and Vélosnes, widely spaced and small, compared to the massive fortifications of other sectors like Thionville. The western portion of the Montmédy sector was even more lightly defended, with several lines of fortifications ranging from fortified houses near the border to small blockhouses farther back. None of the western defences were of a scale sufficient to support La Ferté or to act as a significant block to an invading force without the organized support of mobile army formations. The relatively weak La Ferté position effectively acted as the western end of fixed fortifications.

On 13–14 May, German forces crossed the Meuse near Sedan using integrated land and air tactics that broke the morale of the French 55th Infantry Division, driving them out of the blockhouse line and allowing the Germans to gain a strong position from which to exploit the breakthrough. A progressive collapse of the French Second and Ninth Armies from 14 May to 17 May allowed German forces to move to the west of La Ferté, cutting La Ferté off from much of its mobile support.

== 1940 ==
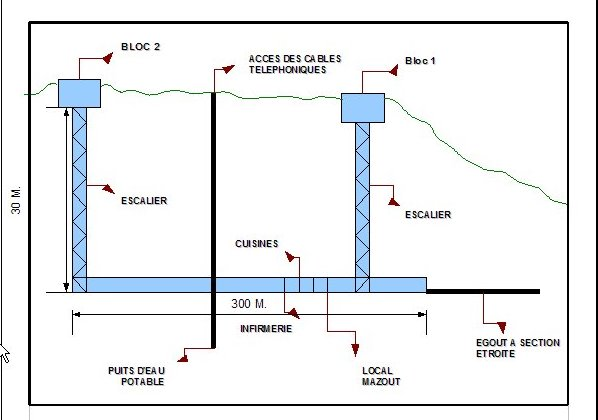
Profile of La Ferté

See Fortified Sector of Montmédy for a broader discussion of the events of 1940 in the Montmédy sector of the Maginot Line.

On 13 May advance elements of the German 71st Infantry Division approached La Ferté (which the Germans called Panzerwerk 505) and occupied the surrounding area, out of range of fire from the ouvrage. The 71st ID had trained specifically for an assault on the Maginot Line, and were provided with shaped charge explosives of the type used in the assault on the Belgian Fort Eben-Emael a few days before. The night of the 13th and 14th La Ferté installed a periscope in its machine gun turret, which had just been delivered on the 11th. On 15 May the Villy Est casemate opened fire on German troops advancing on a nearby farm. On the 16th the Germans took nearby Hill 226, which overlooked La Ferté from the west and attacked the higher Hill 311 (overlooking La Ferté from the south-west) despite fire from the Villy Ouest casemate. That evening, German reconnaissance around La Ferté and the Moiry and Sainte Marie casemates drew supporting fire from Ouvrage Chesnois's 75 mm guns. Chesnois fired 1200 rounds in seven hours. On 17 May, German forces made a series of determined attacks on Hill 311, and German artillery began bombardment of La Ferté with 21 cm mortars and 88 mm high-velocity anti-tank guns. About midday on the 17th, La Ferté's telephone communications were cut, forcing the position to communicate by radio, which could be monitored by the Germans, and which required Bourguignon to transmit through Chesnois to reach headquarters.

The Germans eventually captured Hill 311 just before nightfall, driving off the 1st Battalion of the 23rd Colonial Infantry Regiment with losses. During the afternoon of the 17th, the Villy artillery casemates were evacuated, while the German bombardment continued amid French fire from Chesnois. At about this time, General Huntziger ordered that Villy and La Ferté be relieved to prevent their encirclement, emphasising the importance of French possession of Hill 311, and directing that the town of Inor to the south-west be held at all costs. General Brochard, responsible for the area, decided to counterattack from the south through Hill 311 to La Ferté using the 3rd North African Infantry Division and the newly arrived 6th Infantry Division. Through the ensuing night, La Ferté requested and received supporting fire from Chesnois to suppress German movements on top of the ouvrage.

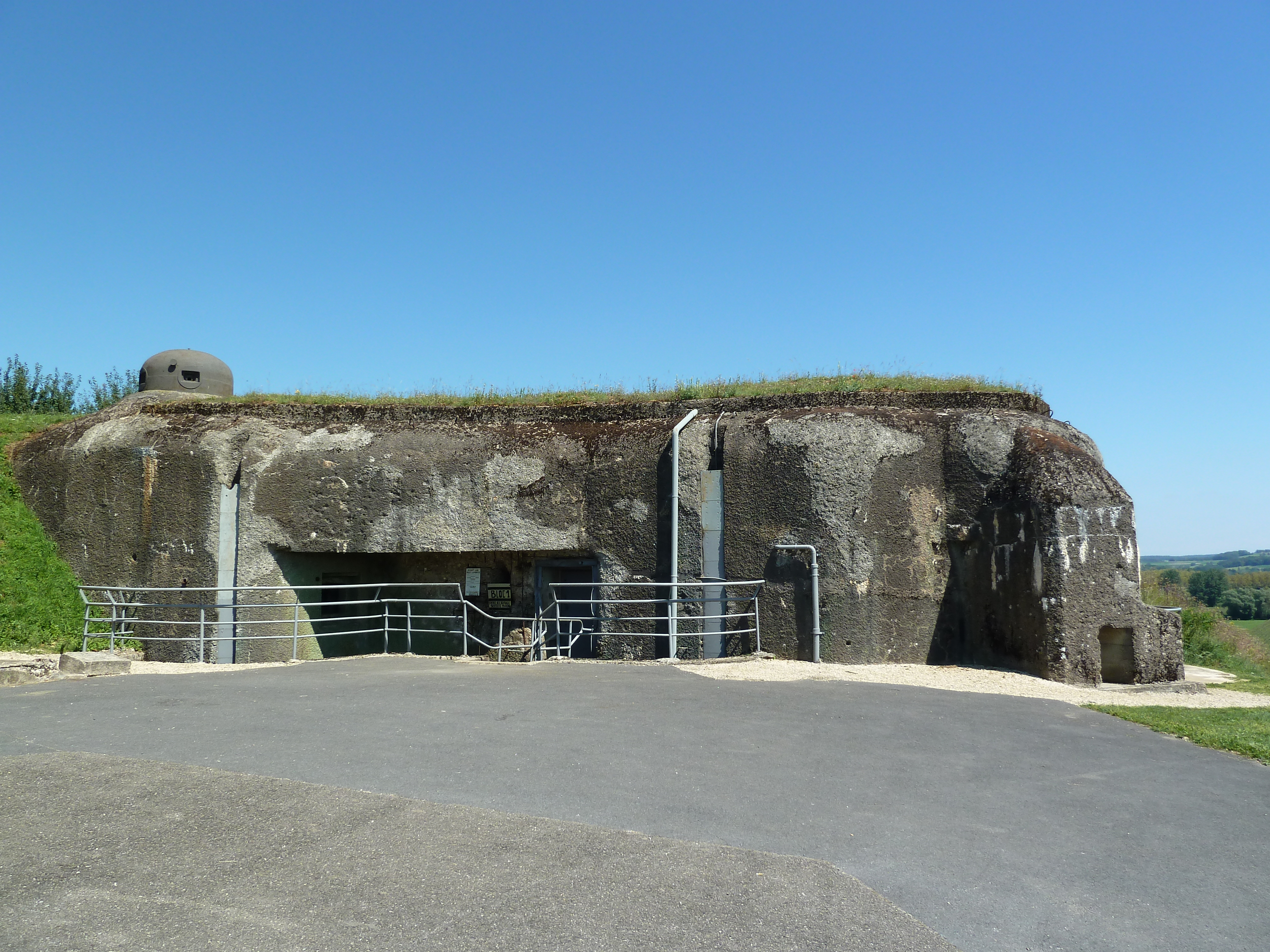
Block 1 in 2012

Telephone service was restored on the morning of 18 May, allowing better artillery coordination in support of La Ferté. By the afternoon, the Germans had occupied the village of Villy, completing the encirclement of the ouvrage. Between 1400 and 1500, Block 2's automatic rifle/observation (GFM) cloche was hit by German fire, killing three. At about the same time, the retractable mixed arms turret on Block 2 became stuck in the opened position, facing to the rear and unable to aim. As this comprised La Ferté's heaviest armament, it significantly reduced the position's defensive strength. At 1700, Germans entered the vacant Villy Est casemate, occupying Villy Ouest an hour later. Both had been evacuated by the French amid concerns about the German presence on Hill 311. From 1800 to 1830, three batteries of German 210 mm howitzers fired on La Ferté with supporting fire on the fort's surroundings from 155 mm howitzers. At 1810, four German 88 mm guns opened fire on the exposed portions of the main ouvrage. The combined artillery fire destroyed the barbed wire entanglements surrounding La Ferté and cratered the ground. Firing ceased after 20 minutes to allow German sappers to destroy the previously damaged GFM cloche. They then threw smoke bombs into the resulting hole and destroyed the stuck turret and two more cloches, leaving Block 2 incapable of further resistance. Supporting fire from Chesnois was hampered by smoke shells that obscured French observation posts' view of La Ferté.

The French counterattack was ordered from French lines using ten Char B tanks supported by two battalions of the 119th Infantry Regiment of the 6th Infantry Division. The attack was launched at 1930. With the infantry making a late start, the tanks halted at the saddle between Hill 311 and La Ferté to let them catch up. The infantry was met on the slopes of Hill 311 by two battalions of the 119th German Infantry Regiment, while three tanks were lost, two to enemy fire. The counterattack failed to reach La Ferté. In the meantime, Chesnois was ordered to cease supporting fire for fear of hitting the French rescue force, allowing the Germans to move freely about the surface. After dark, the Germans opened artillery fire on Block 1, while at the same time blasting the Block 2 mixed arms turret into the air so that it landed askew in its opening. At 2300, a ground assault on Block 1 was launched. Two hours later, all of Block 1's cloches were out of action. Chesnois was directly ordered not to fire on La Ferté by the 6th ID artillery director, despite continuing assertions from observers that the Germans were on top of the position. Lieutenant Bourguignon repeatedly asked General Aymé, his commander at the 3rd Colonial Infantry Division, for permission to abandon the position. Aymé refused to grant it, saying "Your mission has not changed." The commander of Chesnois, Bourguignon's former commander who pleaded with the divisional staff to allow Bourguignon to evacuate, advised him that "A Maginot Line ouvrage is like a submarine. One doesn't leave a submarine: one sinks with it." Contact was lost with La Ferté overnight.

By the morning of the 19th, resistance ceased. There was no response to repeated telephone calls from French headquarters. It became apparent that the interior of Block 2 was on fire. On the 20th, equipped with respirators, the Germans entered Block 2, encountering no one. The next day they were able to enter Block 1. Finding no resistance, the Germans moved on to other objectives. French patrols reached La Ferté on the 28th and 29th, reporting dense smoke within, but were unable to advance. On 2 June a German patrol made a full survey of the ouvrage, finding "the most difficult conditions imaginable," and discovering the corpses of the garrison in the underground gallery, apparently suffocated, most wearing gas masks. By 9 June the area was firmly under German control. The bodies of the garrison were recovered by a German disciplinary battalion and buried. Examination indicated that the garrison died of carbon monoxide poisoning. While the gas masks were effective against low concentrations of carbon monoxide, they could not cope with a concentration greater than 2%.

The entire garrison was posthumously awarded the Ordre de l'Armée and Bourguignon was made a chevalier of the Legion d'Honneur. On the German side, Oberleutnant Alfred Germer, who led the assault on Block 2, was awarded the Knight's Cross. Belated Unteroffizier Walter Pape was also awarded the Knight's Cross for conquering Panzerwerk 505 and for his leading of a storm troop (Sturmtruppführer) against Verdun in June 1940.

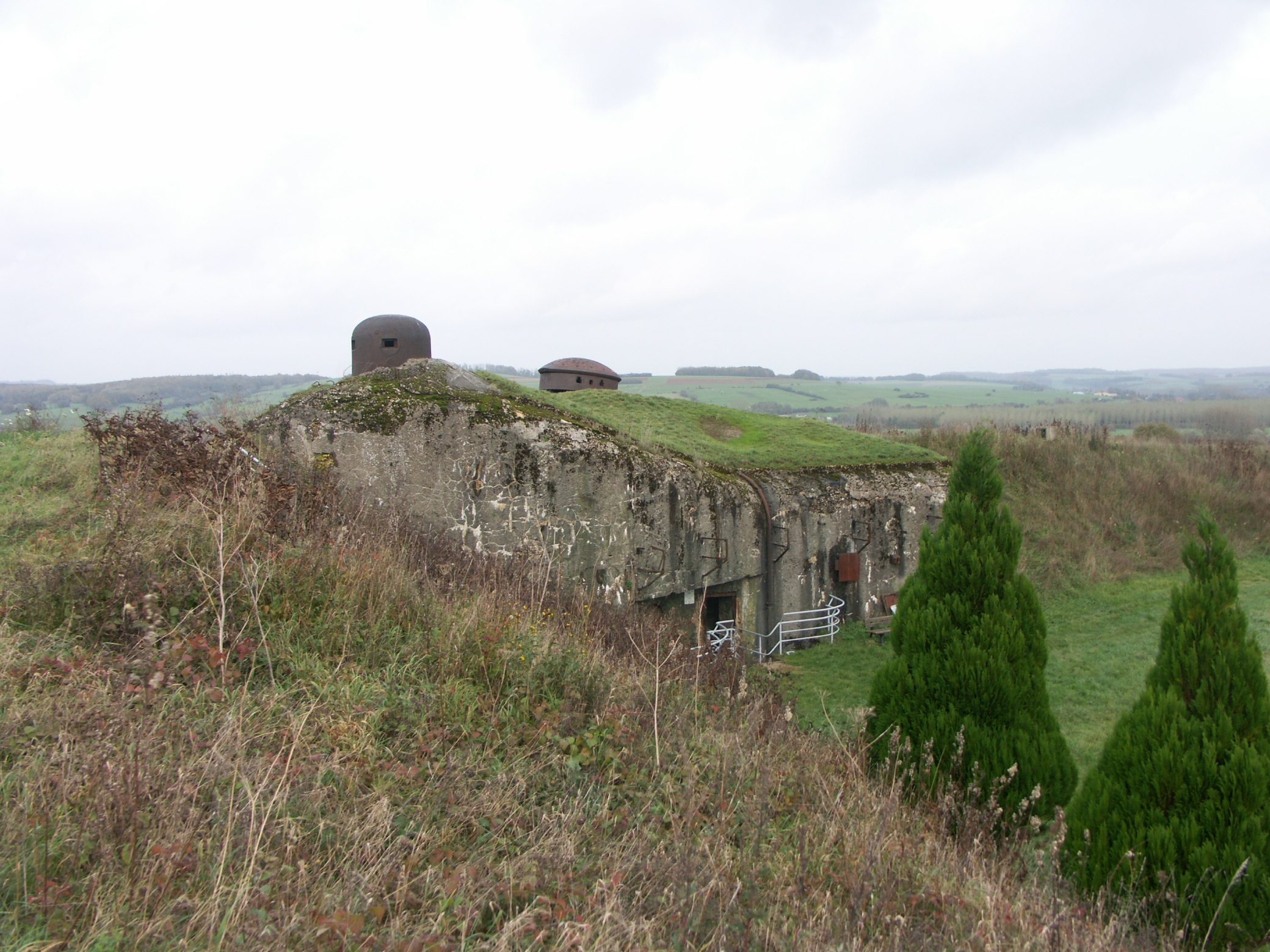
La Ferté Block 2

== Current condition ==
La Ferté is preserved as it was in 1940, with the scars of shellfire visible on cloches and concrete. The site includes a military memorial facing the new road alignment. A small cemetery, established in 1960 opposite the memorial, is the burial site for the majority of the garrison. The ouvrage and surrounding casemates are recorded as French historic monuments. The interior is open to the public on stated days. There is a short documentary (in English) made in May 2019, which tours the fort inside and outside

== See also ==
- List of all works on Maginot Line
- Siegfried Line
- Atlantic Wall
- Czechoslovak border fortifications

== Sources ==
- Allcorn, William. The Maginot Line 1928–45. Oxford: Osprey Publishing, 2003. ISBN 1-84176-646-1
- Degon, André; Zylberyng, Didier, La Ligne Maginot: Guide des Forts à Visiter, Editions Ouest-France, 2014. ISBN 978-2-7373-6080-0 (in French)
- Kaufmann, J.E. and Kaufmann, H.W. Fortress France: The Maginot Line and French Defenses in World War II, Stackpole Books, 2006. ISBN 0-275-98345-5
- Kaufmann, J.E., Kaufmann, H.W., Jancovič-Potočnik, A. and Lang, P. The Maginot Line: History and Guide, Pen and Sword, 2011. ISBN 978-1-84884-068-3
- Mary, Jean-Yves; Hohnadel, Alain; Sicard, Jacques. Hommes et Ouvrages de la Ligne Maginot, Tome 1. Paris: Histoire & Collections, 2001. ISBN 2-908182-88-2 (in French)
- Mary, Jean-Yves; Hohnadel, Alain; Sicard, Jacques. Hommes et Ouvrages de la Ligne Maginot, Tome 2. Paris: Histoire & Collections, 2003. ISBN 2-908182-97-1 (in French)
- Mary, Jean-Yves; Hohnadel, Alain; Sicard, Jacques. Hommes et Ouvrages de la Ligne Maginot, Tome 3. Paris: Histoire & Collections, 2003. ISBN 2-913903-88-6 (in French)
- Mary, Jean-Yves; Hohnadel, Alain; Sicard, Jacques. Hommes et Ouvrages de la Ligne Maginot, Tome 5. Paris: Histoire & Collections, 2009. ISBN 978-2-35250-127-5 (in French)
- Romanych, Marc; Rupp, Martin. Maginot Line 1940: Battles on the French Frontier. Oxford: Osprey Publishing, 2010. ISBN 1-84176-646-1
