= Bréville =

Bréville may refer:

== Communes in France ==
- Bréville, Charente
- Bréville-les-Monts, in the Calvados département
- Bréville-sur-Mer, in the Manche département

== Other uses ==
- Breville Group or Breville, an Australian manufacturer of small home appliances
  - Breville, a brand of Breville Group
- Pierre de Bréville (1861–1949), French composer
- Louis Breville (1918–1928), a chief engineer with Chemins de Fer du Nord

== See also ==
- Brévillers (disambiguation)
- Brévilly
