= Moiry =

Moiry may refer to:

- Moiry, Ardennes, France
- Moiry, Switzerland
