= Arrondissement of Sedan =

Coordinates: 49°42′N 4°56′E

Sedan
- Arrondissement
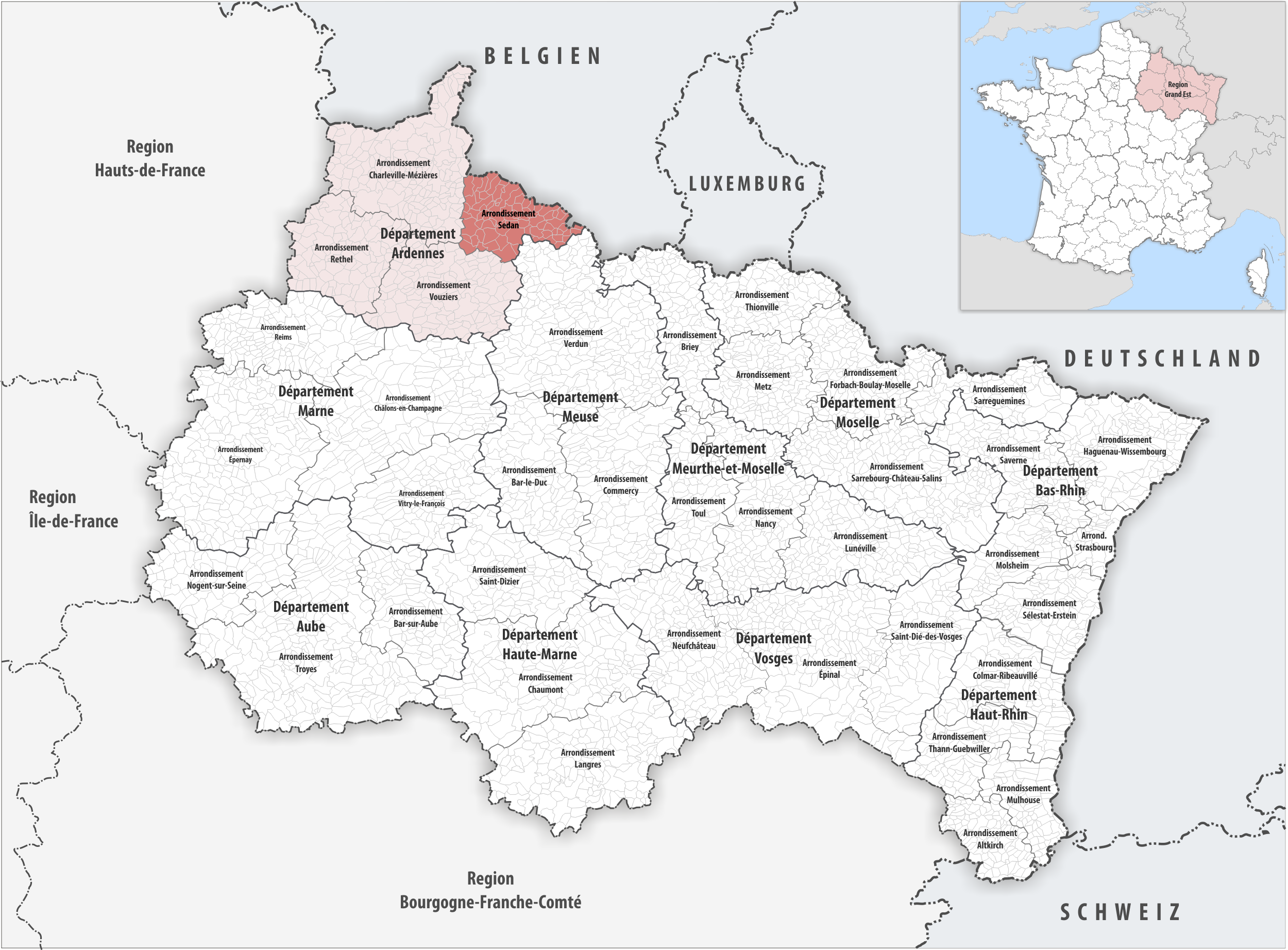
- Location within the region Grand Est
- Country: France
- Region: Grand Est
- Department: Ardennes
- No. of communes: {{{nbcomm}}}
- Area: 792.2 km^{2} (305.9 sq mi)
- Population (2023): 56,088
  - Density: 70.80/km^{2} (183.4/sq mi)
- INSEE code: 083

The arrondissement of Sedan is an arrondissement of France in the Ardennes department in the Grand Est region. It has 71 communes. As of 2021, its population is 56,483, and it covers an area of 792.2 km² (305.9 sq mi).

== Composition ==
The communes of the arrondissement of Sedan, and their INSEE codes, are:

1. Angecourt (08013)
2. Artaise-le-Vivier (08023)
3. Auflance (08029)
4. Autrecourt-et-Pourron (08034)
5. Balan (08043)
6. Bazeilles (08053)
7. Beaumont-en-Argonne (08055)
8. La Besace (08063)
9. Bièvres (08065)
10. Blagny (08067)
11. Brévilly (08083)
12. Bulson (08088)
13. Carignan (08090)
14. La Chapelle (08101)
15. Cheveuges (08119)
16. Chémery-Chéhéry (08115)
17. Daigny (08136)
18. Les Deux-Villes (08138)
19. Donchery (08142)
20. Douzy (08145)
21. Escombres-et-le-Chesnois (08153)
22. Euilly-et-Lombut (08159)
23. La Ferté-sur-Chiers (08168)
24. Fleigneux (08170)
25. Floing (08174)
26. Francheval (08179)
27. Fromy (08184)
28. Givonne (08191)
29. Glaire (08194)
30. Haraucourt (08211)
31. Herbeuval (08223)
32. Illy (08232)
33. Linay (08255)
34. Létanne (08252)
35. Maisoncelle-et-Villers (08268)
36. Malandry (08269)
37. Margny (08275)
38. Margut (08276)
39. Matton-et-Clémency (08281)
40. Messincourt (08289)
41. Mogues (08291)
42. Moiry (08293)
43. Mouzon (08311)
44. La Neuville-à-Maire (08317)
45. Noyers-Pont-Maugis (08331)
46. Osnes (08336)
47. Pouru-Saint-Remy (08343)
48. Pouru-aux-Bois (08342)
49. Puilly-et-Charbeaux (08347)
50. Pure (08349)
51. Raucourt-et-Flaba (08354)
52. Remilly-Aillicourt (08357)
53. Sachy (08375)
54. Sailly (08376)
55. Saint-Aignan (08377)
56. Saint-Menges (08391)
57. Sapogne-sur-Marche (08399)
58. Sedan (08409)
59. Signy-Montlibert (08421)
60. Stonne (08430)
61. Thelonne (08445)
62. Tremblois-lès-Carignan (08459)
63. Tétaigne (08444)
64. Vaux-lès-Mouzon (08466)
65. Villers-devant-Mouzon (08477)
66. Villers-sur-Bar (08481)
67. Villy (08485)
68. Vrigne-aux-Bois (08491)
69. Wadelincourt (08494)
70. Williers (08501)
71. Yoncq (08502)

== History ==
The arrondissement of Sedan was created in 1800, disbanded in 1926 and restored in 1942.

As a result of the reorganisation of the cantons of France which came into effect in 2015, the borders of the cantons are no longer related to the borders of the arrondissements. The cantons of the arrondissement of Sedan were, as of January 2015:

1. Carignan
2. Mouzon
3. Raucourt-et-Flaba
4. Sedan-Est
5. Sedan-Nord
6. Sedan-Ouest

== Sub-prefects ==
- Louis Thibon : 2 April 1904
