= Osnes =

Osnes may refer to:

== People ==
- Asbjørn Osnes (1932–2011), Norwegian ski jumper
- Knut Osnes (1922–2015), Norwegian football player and coach
- Laura Osnes (born 1985), American actress and singer known
- Tarald Osnes Brautaset (born 1946), Norwegian diplomat

== Places ==
- Osnes, Ardennes, commune in the Ardennes department in northern France
- Osnes, Rogaland, Norway
