= Messincourt =

- Commune
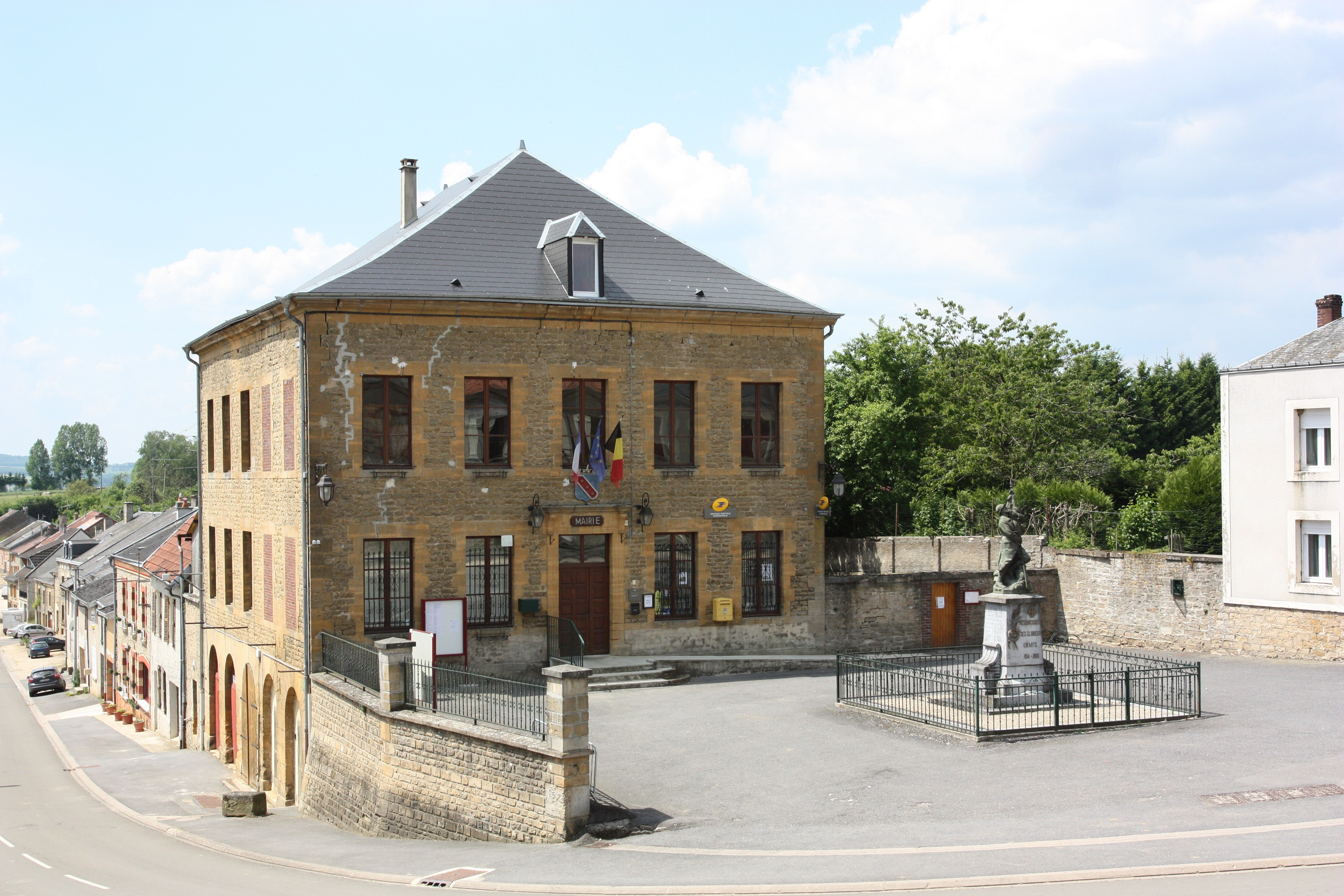
- The town hall in Messincourt

- Coat of arms
- Location of Messincourt
- Location within France Location within Grand Est
- Coordinates: 49°40′51″N 5°09′16″E
- Country: France
- Region: Grand Est
- Department: Ardennes
- Arrondissement: Sedan
- Canton: Carignan
- Intercommunality: Portes du Luxembourg

Government
  - Mayor (2020–2026): Michel Sabatier
- Area^{1}: 8.15 km^{2} (3.15 sq mi)
- Elevation: 240 m (790 ft)
- Population (2023): 580
  - Density: 71/km^{2} (180/sq mi)
- Time zone: UTC+01:00 (CET)
  - Summer (DST): UTC+02:00 (CEST)
- INSEE/Postal code: 08289 /08110
- ^{1} French Land Register data, which excludes lakes, ponds, glaciers > 1 km^{2} (0.386 sq mi or 247 acres) and river estuaries.

Messincourt (French pronunciation: [mesɛ̃kuʁ]) is a commune in the Ardennes department and Grand Est region of north-eastern France.

== Population ==
Historical population
Year	Pop.	±% p.a.
1968	677	—
1975	704	+0.56%
1982	618	−1.84%
1990	555	−1.34%
1999	530	−0.51%
2007	588	+1.31%
2012	617	+0.97%
2017	612	−0.16%
2023	580	−0.89%
Source: INSEE

== See also ==
- Communes of the Ardennes department
