= Sapogne-sur-Marche =

- Commune
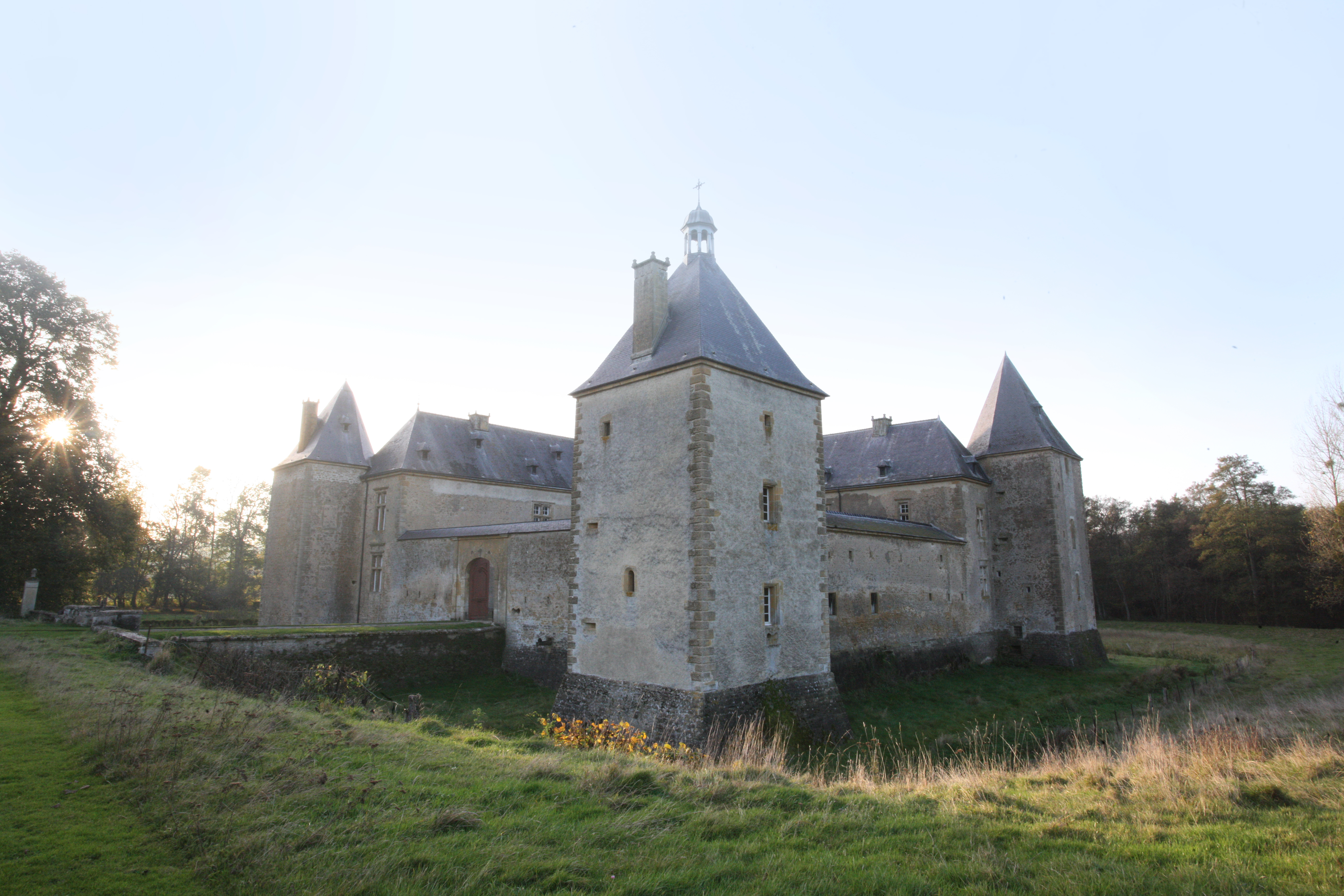
- Chateau of Tassigny

- Coat of arms
- Location of Sapogne-sur-Marche
- Location within France Location within Grand Est
- Coordinates: 49°36′00″N 5°19′07″E
- Country: France
- Region: Grand Est
- Department: Ardennes
- Arrondissement: Sedan
- Canton: Carignan
- Intercommunality: Portes du Luxembourg

Government
  - Mayor (2020–2026): Pascal Nicolas
- Area^{1}: 5.41 km^{2} (2.09 sq mi)
- Elevation: 186 m (610 ft)
- Population (2023): 154
  - Density: 28.5/km^{2} (73.7/sq mi)
- Time zone: UTC+01:00 (CET)
  - Summer (DST): UTC+02:00 (CEST)
- INSEE/Postal code: 08399 /08370
- ^{1} French Land Register data, which excludes lakes, ponds, glaciers > 1 km^{2} (0.386 sq mi or 247 acres) and river estuaries.

Sapogne-sur-Marche (German pronunciation: [sapɔɲ syʁ maʁʃ]) is a commune in the Ardennes department and Grand Est region of north-eastern France.

== Population ==
Historical population
Year	Pop.	±% p.a.
1968	216	—
1975	182	−2.42%
1982	162	−1.65%
1990	133	−2.44%
1999	130	−0.25%
2007	142	+1.11%
2012	140	−0.28%
2017	138	−0.29%
2023	154	+1.85%
Source: INSEE

== See also ==
- Communes of the Ardennes department
