= Euilly-et-Lombut =

- Commune
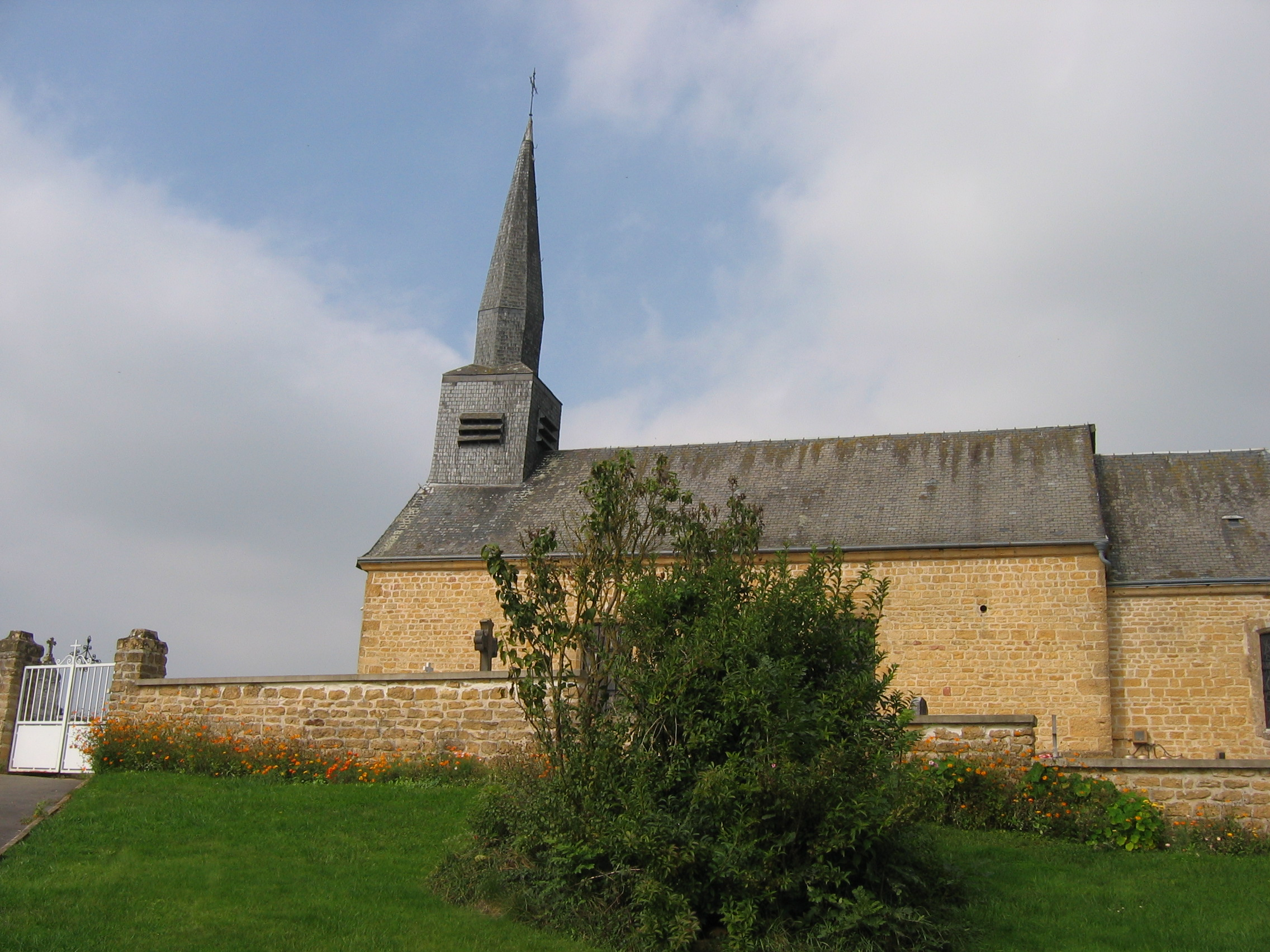
- The church in Euilly

- Coat of arms
- Location of Euilly-et-Lombut
- Location within France Location within Grand Est
- Coordinates: 49°37′48″N 5°07′16″E
- Country: France
- Region: Grand Est
- Department: Ardennes
- Arrondissement: Sedan
- Canton: Carignan
- Intercommunality: Portes du Lexembourg

Government
  - Mayor (2020–2026): Daniel Dozieres
- Area^{1}: 10.11 km^{2} (3.90 sq mi)
- Elevation: 205 m (673 ft)
- Population (2023): 119
  - Density: 11.8/km^{2} (30.5/sq mi)
- Time zone: UTC+01:00 (CET)
  - Summer (DST): UTC+02:00 (CEST)
- INSEE/Postal code: 08159 /08210
- ^{1} French Land Register data, which excludes lakes, ponds, glaciers > 1 km^{2} (0.386 sq mi or 247 acres) and river estuaries.

Euilly-et-Lombut (French pronunciation: [œji e lɔ̃by]) is a commune in the Ardennes department and Grand Est region of north-eastern France.

The fortress of Euilly-et-Lombut, which was mostly destroyed in the 18th century, is known as one of the Quatre Filles d'Yvois (four daughters of Yvois). Nowadays, there are only two towers remaining.

== Population ==
Historical population
Year	Pop.	±% p.a.
1968	157	—
1975	137	−1.93%
1982	129	−0.86%
1990	123	−0.59%
1999	114	−0.84%
2007	109	−0.56%
2012	110	+0.18%
2017	114	+0.72%
2023	119	+0.72%
Source: INSEE

== See also ==
- Communes of the Ardennes department
