= Yoncq =

- Commune
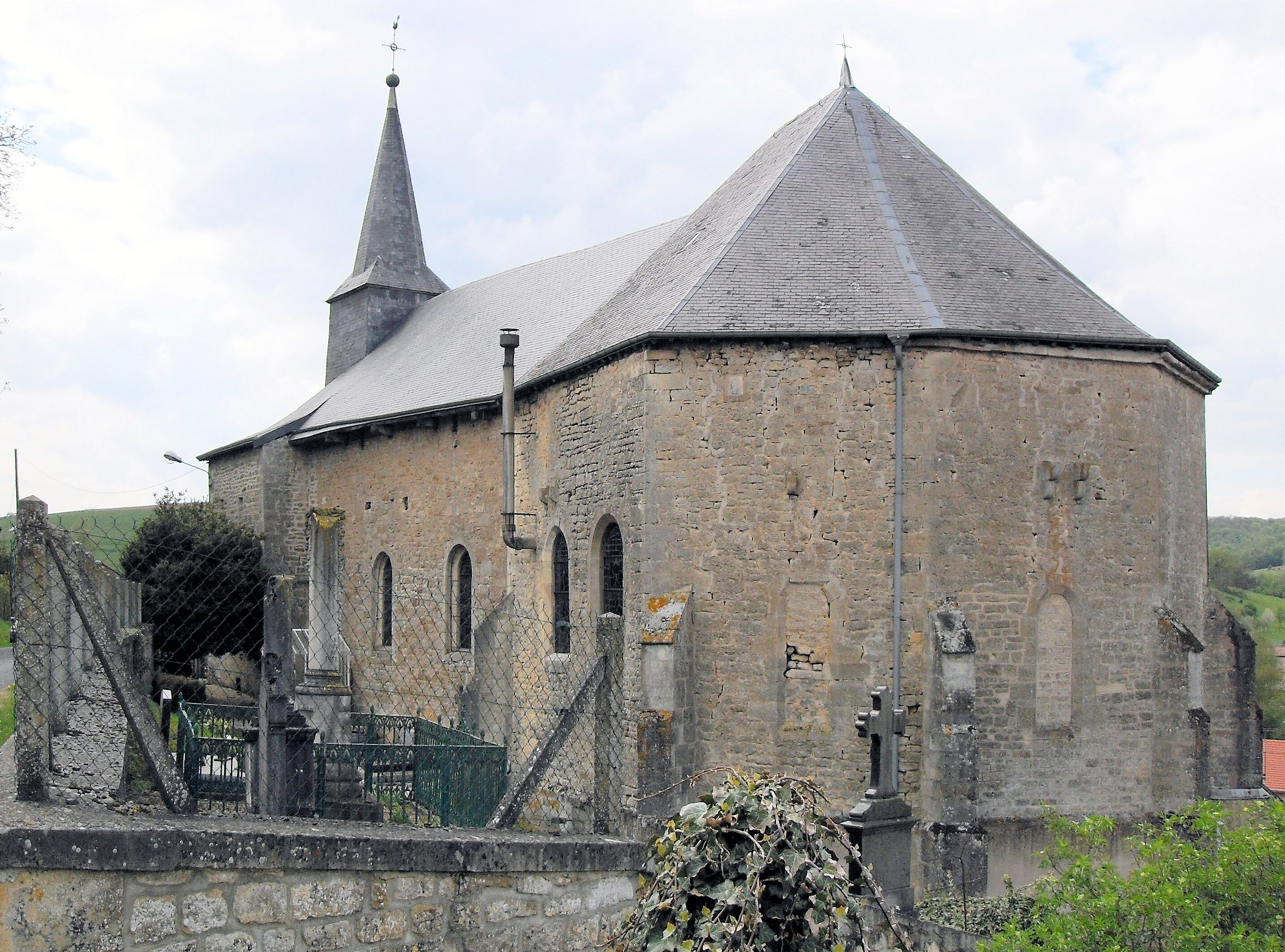
- The church in Yoncq

- Coat of arms
- Location of Yoncq
- Location within France Location within Grand Est
- Coordinates: 49°34′01″N 5°01′01″E
- Country: France
- Region: Grand Est
- Department: Ardennes
- Arrondissement: Sedan
- Canton: Carignan
- Intercommunality: Portes du Luxembourg

Government
  - Mayor (2020–2026): Marie-Pascale Ponsignon
- Area^{1}: 15.5 km^{2} (6.0 sq mi)
- Elevation: 180 m (590 ft)
- Population (2023): 80
  - Density: 5.2/km^{2} (13/sq mi)
- Time zone: UTC+01:00 (CET)
  - Summer (DST): UTC+02:00 (CEST)
- INSEE/Postal code: 08502 /08210
- ^{1} French Land Register data, which excludes lakes, ponds, glaciers > 1 km^{2} (0.386 sq mi or 247 acres) and river estuaries.

Yoncq (French pronunciation: [jɔ̃k]) is a commune in the Ardennes department in the Grand Est region in northern France.

== Population ==
Historical population
Year	Pop.	±% p.a.
1968	161	—
1975	145	−1.48%
1982	126	−1.99%
1990	112	−1.46%
1999	86	−2.89%
2007	94	+1.12%
2012	105	+2.24%
2017	101	−0.77%
2023	80	−3.81%
Source: INSEE

== See also ==
- Communes of the Ardennes department
