= Malandry =

- Commune
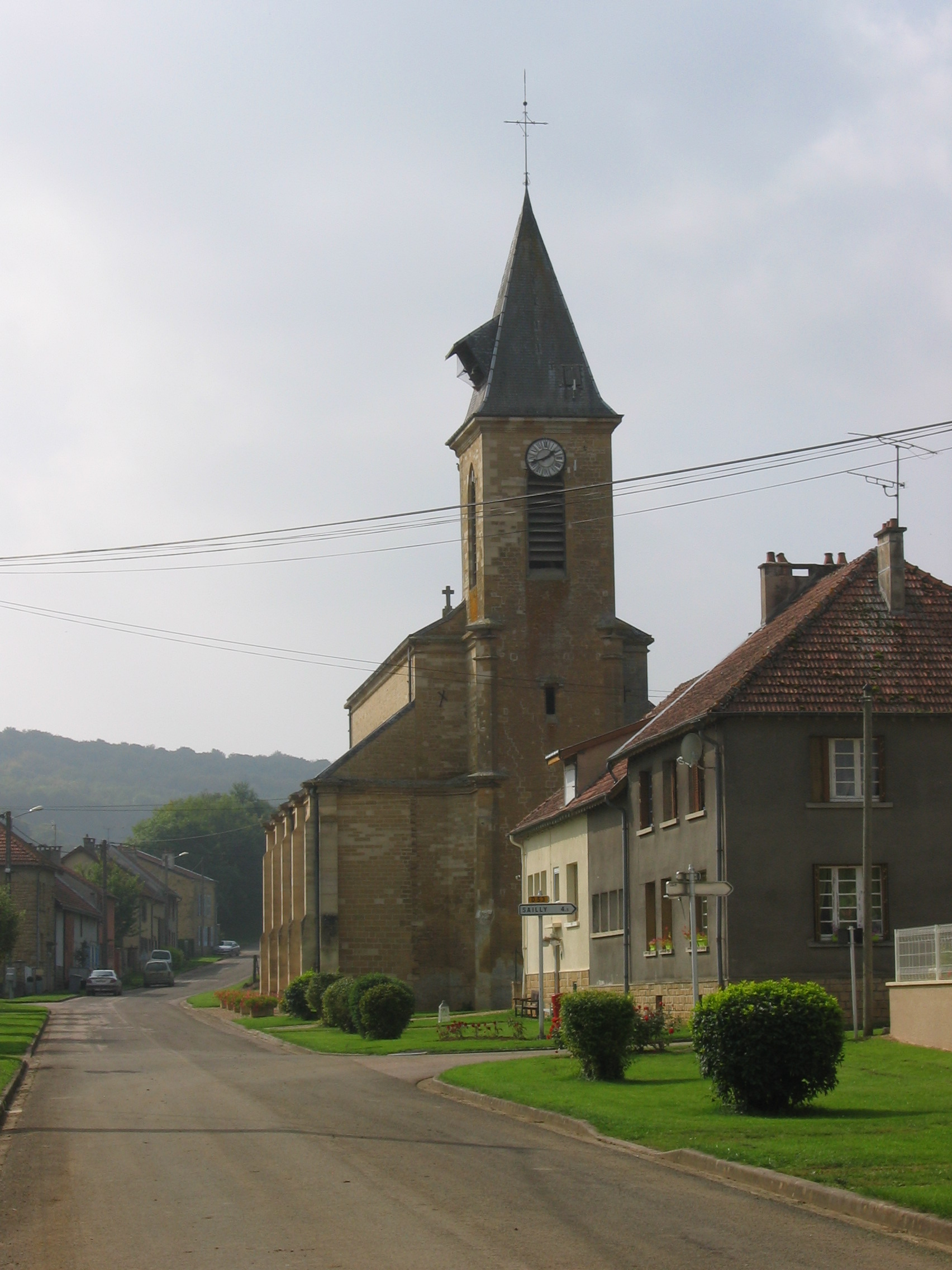
- The church and surroundings in Malandry

- Coat of arms
- Location of Malandry
- Location within France Location within Grand Est
- Coordinates: 49°34′50″N 5°11′48″E
- Country: France
- Region: Grand Est
- Department: Ardennes
- Arrondissement: Sedan
- Canton: Carignan
- Intercommunality: Portes du Luxembourg

Government
  - Mayor (2020–2026): Annick Dufils
- Area^{1}: 6.87 km^{2} (2.65 sq mi)
- Elevation: 188 m (617 ft)
- Population (2023): 80
  - Density: 12/km^{2} (30/sq mi)
- Time zone: UTC+01:00 (CET)
  - Summer (DST): UTC+02:00 (CEST)
- INSEE/Postal code: 08269 /08370
- ^{1} French Land Register data, which excludes lakes, ponds, glaciers > 1 km^{2} (0.386 sq mi or 247 acres) and river estuaries.

Malandry (French pronunciation: [malɑ̃dʁi]) is a commune in the Ardennes department and Grand Est region of north-eastern France.

== Population ==
Historical population
Year	Pop.	±% p.a.
1968	96	—
1975	87	−1.40%
1982	83	−0.67%
1990	62	−3.58%
1999	60	−0.36%
2007	64	+0.81%
2012	78	+4.04%
2017	82	+1.01%
2023	80	−0.41%
Source: INSEE

== See also ==
- Communes of the Ardennes department
