= Fromy =

- Commune
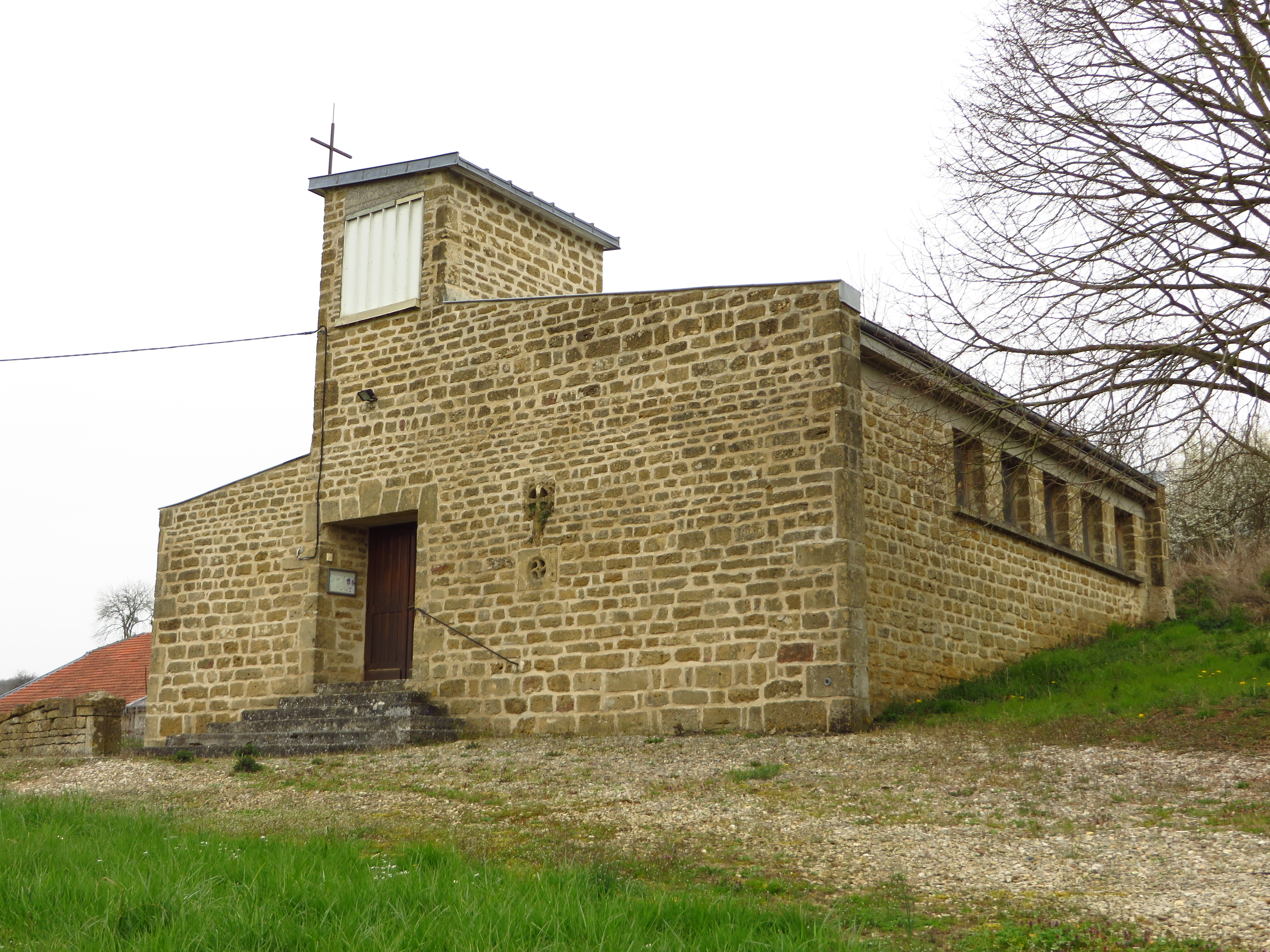
- The church in Fromy

- Coat of arms
- Location of Fromy
- Location within France Location within Grand Est
- Coordinates: 49°35′52″N 5°15′05″E
- Country: France
- Region: Grand Est
- Department: Ardennes
- Arrondissement: Sedan
- Canton: Carignan

Government
  - Mayor (2020–2026): Dominique Gerard
- Area^{1}: 3.71 km^{2} (1.43 sq mi)
- Elevation: 168 m (551 ft)
- Population (2023): 87
  - Density: 23/km^{2} (61/sq mi)
- Time zone: UTC+01:00 (CET)
  - Summer (DST): UTC+02:00 (CEST)
- INSEE/Postal code: 08184 /08370
- ^{1} French Land Register data, which excludes lakes, ponds, glaciers > 1 km^{2} (0.386 sq mi or 247 acres) and river estuaries.

Fromy (French pronunciation: [fʁɔmi]) is a commune in the Ardennes department in northern France.

== Population ==
Historical population
Year	Pop.	±% p.a.
1968	152	—
1975	152	+0.00%
1982	125	−2.76%
1990	90	−4.02%
1999	84	−0.76%
2007	82	−0.30%
2012	81	−0.25%
2017	82	+0.25%
2023	87	+0.99%
Source: INSEE

== See also ==
- Communes of the Ardennes department
