= Les Deux-Villes =

- Commune
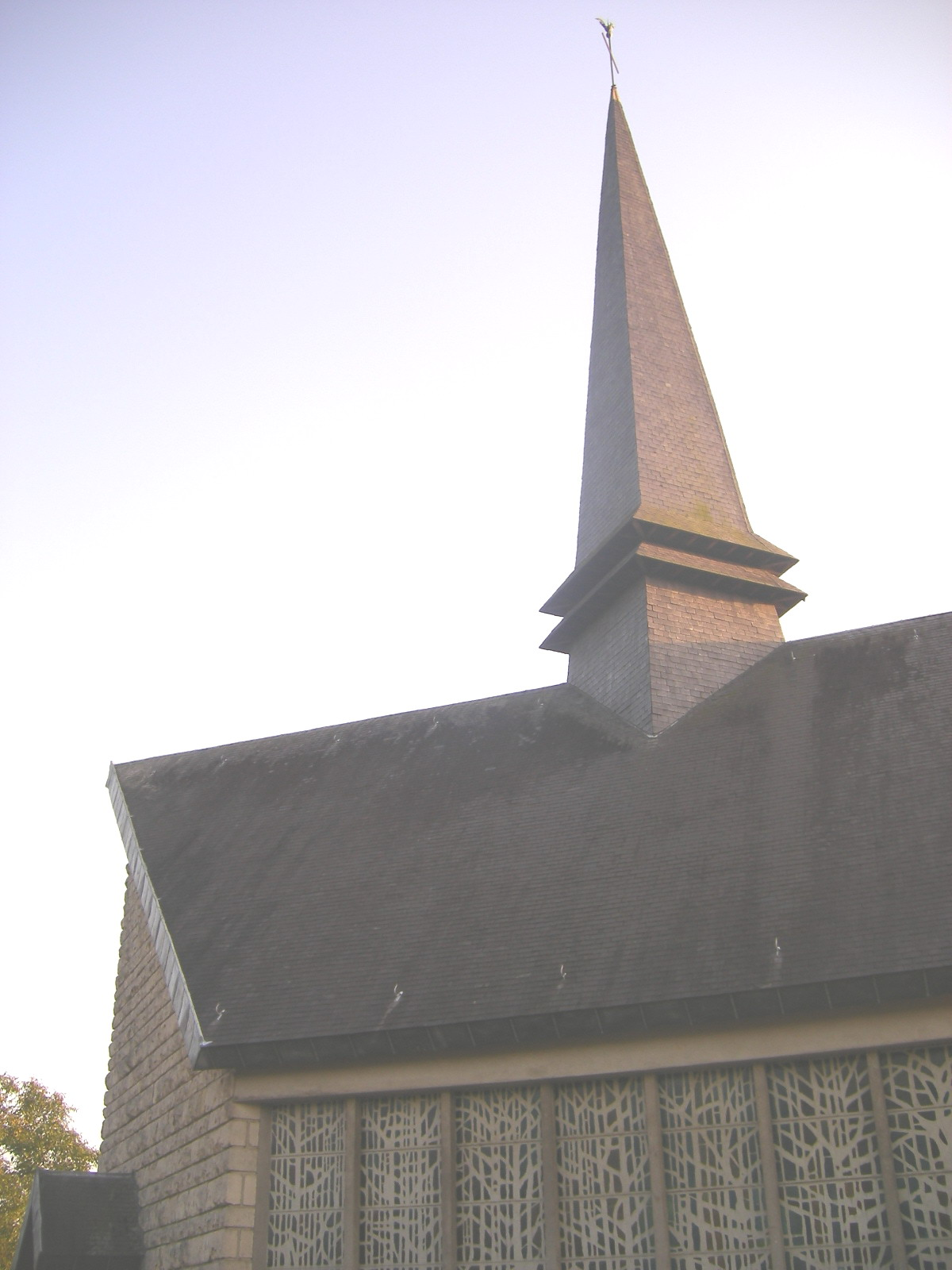
- The church in Les Deux-Villes

- Coat of arms
- Location of Les Deux-Villes
- Location within France Location within Grand Est
- Coordinates: 49°39′04″N 5°13′58″E
- Country: France
- Region: Grand Est
- Department: Ardennes
- Arrondissement: Sedan
- Canton: Carignan
- Intercommunality: Portes du Luxembourg

Government
  - Mayor (2020–2026): Géry Tronçon
- Area^{1}: 8.14 km^{2} (3.14 sq mi)
- Elevation: 223 m (732 ft)
- Population (2023): 248
  - Density: 30.5/km^{2} (78.9/sq mi)
- Time zone: UTC+01:00 (CET)
  - Summer (DST): UTC+02:00 (CEST)
- INSEE/Postal code: 08138 /08110
- ^{1} French Land Register data, which excludes lakes, ponds, glaciers > 1 km^{2} (0.386 sq mi or 247 acres) and river estuaries.

Les Deux-Villes (French pronunciation: [le dø vil], literally The Two Towns) is a commune in the Ardennes department in northern France.

== Population ==
Historical population
Year	Pop.	±% p.a.
1968	240	—
1975	230	−0.61%
1982	206	−1.56%
1990	195	−0.68%
1999	219	+1.30%
2007	257	+2.02%
2012	271	+1.07%
2017	254	−1.29%
2023	248	−0.40%
Source: INSEE

== See also ==
- Communes of the Ardennes department
