= Williers =

- Commune
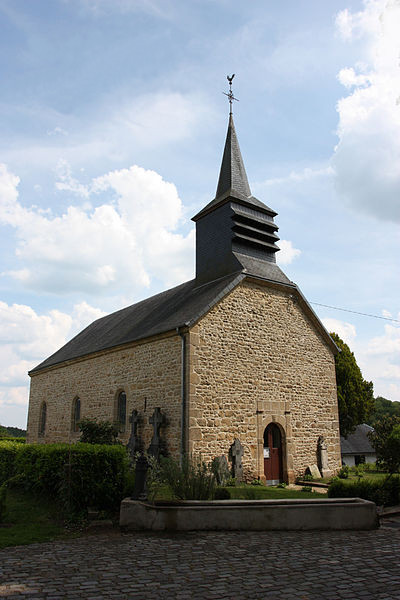
- The church in Williers

- Coat of arms
- Location of Williers
- Location within France Location within Grand Est
- Coordinates: 49°40′07″N 5°18′39″E
- Country: France
- Region: Grand Est
- Department: Ardennes
- Arrondissement: Sedan
- Canton: Carignan
- Intercommunality: Portes du Luxembourg

Government
  - Mayor (2020–2026): Marie-Françoise Collin
- Area^{1}: 2.26 km^{2} (0.87 sq mi)
- Elevation: 329 m (1,079 ft)
- Population (2023): 39
  - Density: 17/km^{2} (45/sq mi)
- Time zone: UTC+01:00 (CET)
  - Summer (DST): UTC+02:00 (CEST)
- INSEE/Postal code: 08501 /08110
- ^{1} French Land Register data, which excludes lakes, ponds, glaciers > 1 km^{2} (0.386 sq mi or 247 acres) and river estuaries.

Williers is a commune in the Ardennes department in northern France.

== Population ==
Historical population
Year	Pop.	±% p.a.
1968	53	—
1975	46	−2.00%
1982	40	−1.98%
1990	34	−2.01%
1999	38	+1.24%
2007	44	+1.85%
2012	51	+3.00%
2017	42	−3.81%
2023	39	−1.23%
Source: INSEE

== See also ==
- Communes of the Ardennes department
- williers.com
