= Vaux-lès-Mouzon =

- Commune
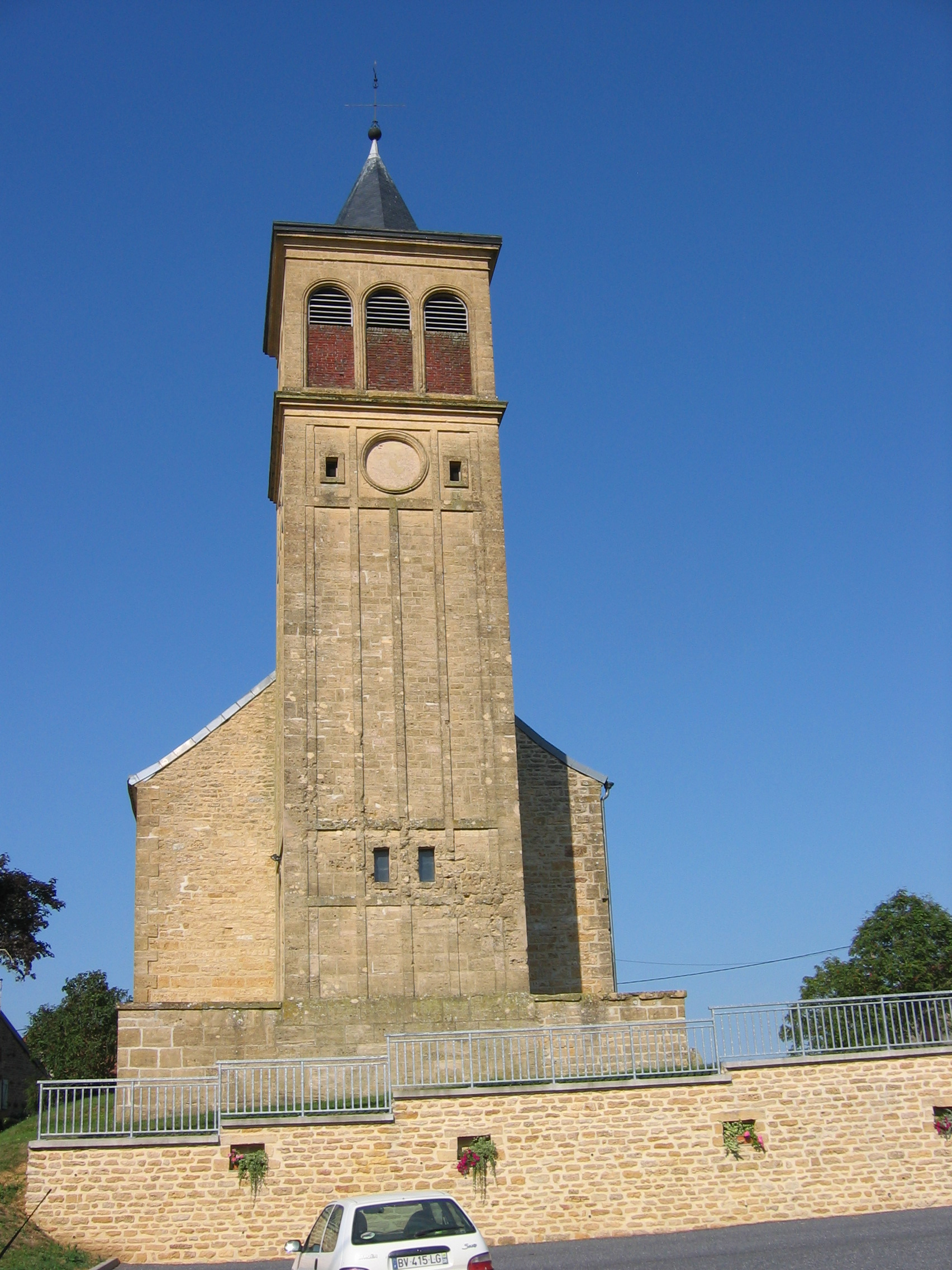
- The church in Vaux-lès-Mouzon

- Coat of arms
- Location of Vaux-lès-Mouzon
- Location within France Location within Grand Est
- Coordinates: 49°36′28″N 5°07′50″E
- Country: France
- Region: Grand Est
- Department: Ardennes
- Arrondissement: Sedan
- Canton: Carignan

Government
  - Mayor (2020–2026): Denis Petitpas
- Area^{1}: 7.64 km^{2} (2.95 sq mi)
- Elevation: 250 m (820 ft)
- Highest elevation: 349 m (1,145 ft)
- Lowest elevation: 161 m (528 ft)
- Population (2023): 74
  - Density: 9.7/km^{2} (25/sq mi)
- Time zone: UTC+01:00 (CET)
  - Summer (DST): UTC+02:00 (CEST)
- INSEE/Postal code: 08466 /08210
- ^{1} French Land Register data, which excludes lakes, ponds, glaciers > 1 km^{2} (0.386 sq mi or 247 acres) and river estuaries.

Vaux-lès-Mouzon (French pronunciation: [vo lɛ muzɔ̃], literally Vaux near Mouzon) is a commune in the Ardennes department in northern France.

== Population ==
Historical population
Year	Pop.	±% p.a.
1968	130	—
1975	106	−2.87%
1982	90	−2.31%
1990	81	−1.31%
1999	78	−0.42%
2007	85	+1.08%
2012	87	+0.47%
2017	73	−3.45%
2023	74	+0.23%
Source: INSEE

== See also ==
- Communes of the Ardennes department
