= Margny, Ardennes =

Margny
- Commune
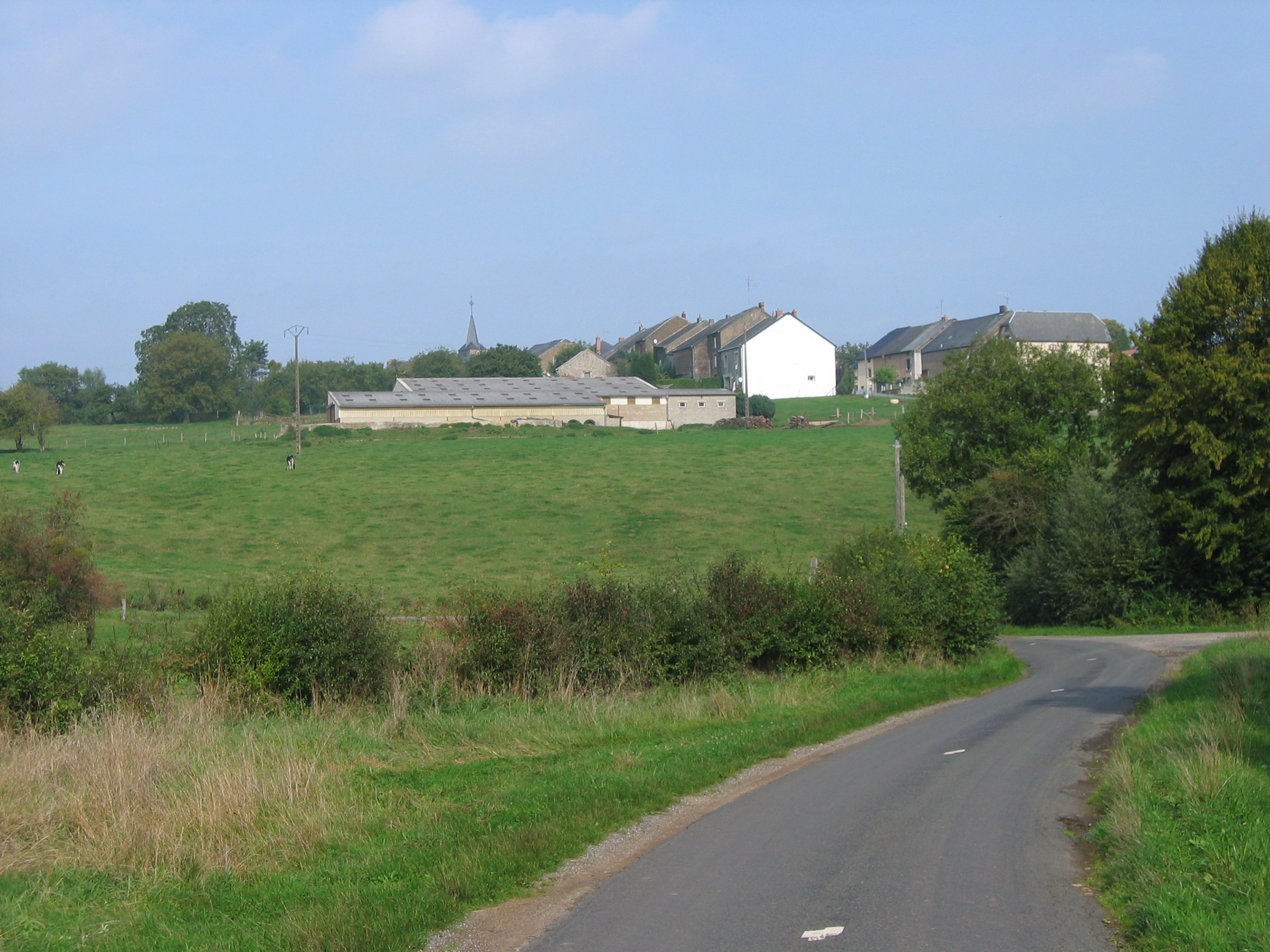
- A general view of Margny

- Coat of arms
- Location of Margny
- Location within France Location within Grand Est
- Coordinates: 49°36′56″N 5°21′08″E
- Country: France
- Region: Grand Est
- Department: Ardennes
- Arrondissement: Sedan
- Canton: Carignan

Government
  - Mayor (2020–2026): Michel Protin
- Area^{1}: 6.68 km^{2} (2.58 sq mi)
- Elevation: 250 m (820 ft)
- Population (2023): 210
  - Density: 31/km^{2} (81/sq mi)
- Time zone: UTC+01:00 (CET)
  - Summer (DST): UTC+02:00 (CEST)
- INSEE/Postal code: 08275 /08370
- ^{1} French Land Register data, which excludes lakes, ponds, glaciers > 1 km^{2} (0.386 sq mi or 247 acres) and river estuaries.

Margny (French pronunciation: [maʁɲi]) is a commune in the Ardennes department in northern France.

== Population ==
Historical population
Year	Pop.	±% p.a.
1968	212	—
1975	185	−1.93%
1982	164	−1.71%
1990	143	−1.70%
1999	172	+2.07%
2007	177	+0.36%
2012	172	−0.57%
2017	192	+2.22%
2023	210	+1.50%
Source: INSEE

== See also ==
- Communes of the Ardennes department
