= Herbeuval =

- Commune
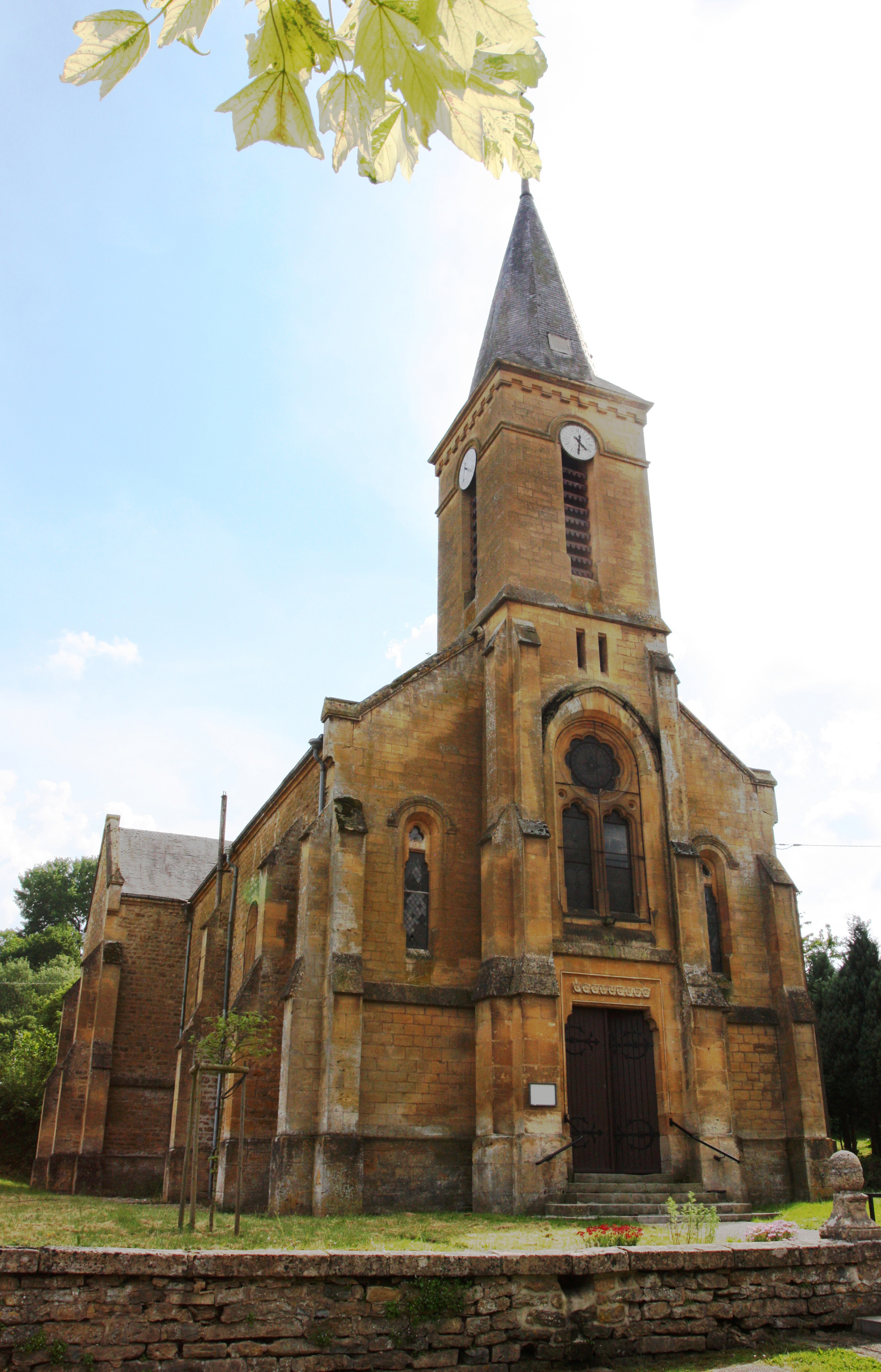
- The church in Herbeuval

- Coat of arms
- Location of Herbeuval
- Location within France Location within Grand Est
- Coordinates: 49°36′11″N 5°20′24″E
- Country: France
- Region: Grand Est
- Department: Ardennes
- Arrondissement: Sedan
- Canton: Carignan

Government
  - Mayor (2020–2026): Franck Jullien
- Area^{1}: 7.4 km^{2} (2.9 sq mi)
- Elevation: 218 m (715 ft)
- Population (2023): 124
  - Density: 17/km^{2} (43/sq mi)
- Time zone: UTC+01:00 (CET)
  - Summer (DST): UTC+02:00 (CEST)
- INSEE/Postal code: 08223 /08370
- ^{1} French Land Register data, which excludes lakes, ponds, glaciers > 1 km^{2} (0.386 sq mi or 247 acres) and river estuaries.

Herbeuval (French pronunciation: [ɛʁbœval]) is a commune in the Ardennes department in northern France.

== Population ==
Historical population
Year	Pop.	±% p.a.
1968	140	—
1975	110	−3.39%
1982	91	−2.67%
1990	77	−2.07%
1999	79	+0.29%
2007	81	+0.31%
2012	105	+5.33%
2017	121	+2.88%
2023	124	+0.41%
Source: INSEE

== See also ==
- Communes of the Ardennes department
