= Tétaigne =

- Commune
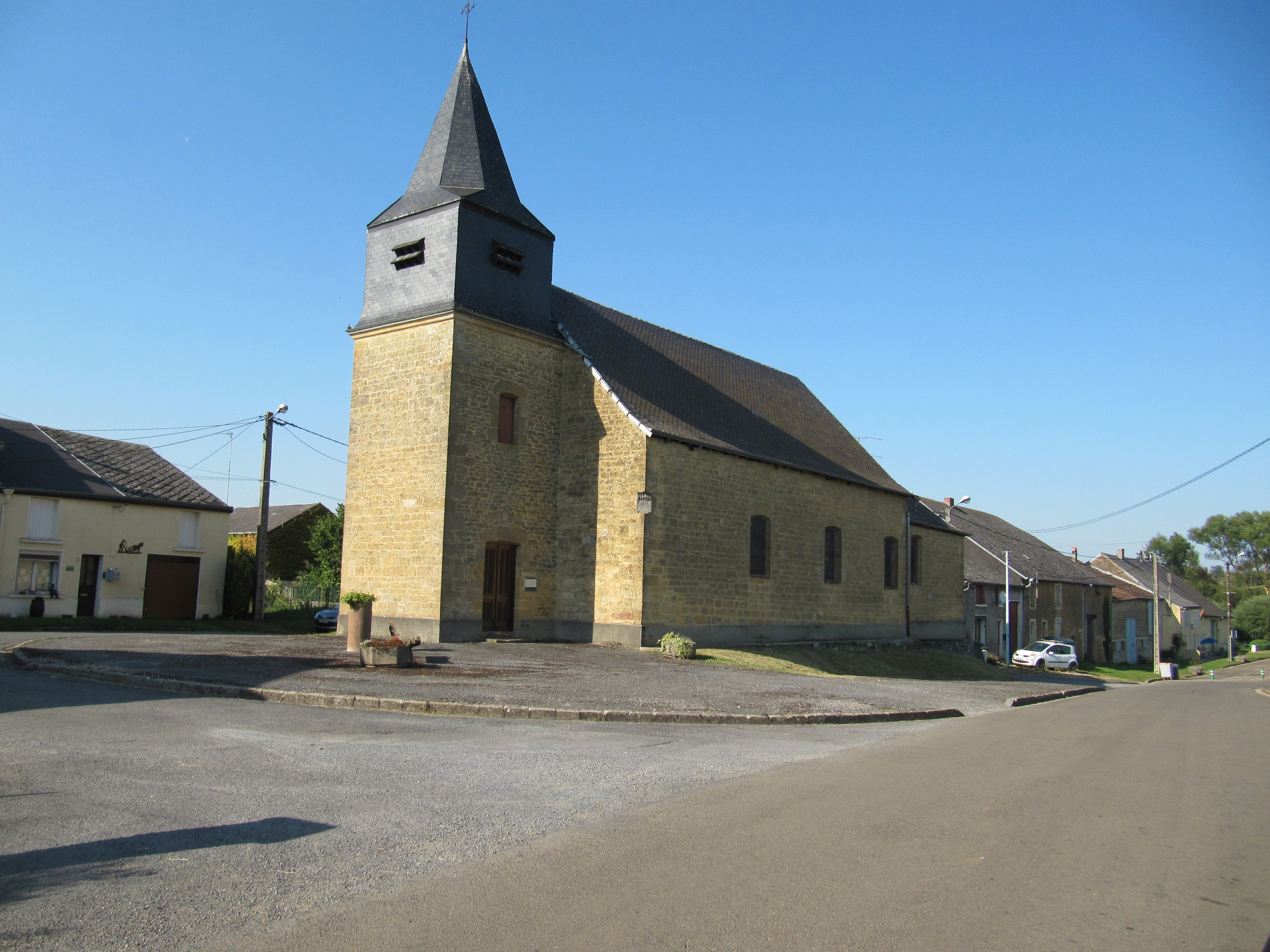
- The church in Tétaigne

- Coat of arms
- Location of Tétaigne
- Location within France Location within Grand Est
- Coordinates: 49°39′07″N 5°07′53″E
- Country: France
- Region: Grand Est
- Department: Ardennes
- Arrondissement: Sedan
- Canton: Carignan

Government
  - Mayor (2020–2026): Jean-Marie Pierre
- Area^{1}: 5.79 km^{2} (2.24 sq mi)
- Elevation: 170 m (560 ft)
- Population (2023): 134
  - Density: 23.1/km^{2} (59.9/sq mi)
- Time zone: UTC+01:00 (CET)
  - Summer (DST): UTC+02:00 (CEST)
- INSEE/Postal code: 08444 /08110
- ^{1} French Land Register data, which excludes lakes, ponds, glaciers > 1 km^{2} (0.386 sq mi or 247 acres) and river estuaries.

Tétaigne (French pronunciation: [tetɛɲ]) is a commune in the Ardennes department in northern France.

== Population ==
Historical population
Year	Pop.	±% p.a.
1968	142	—
1975	120	−2.38%
1982	95	−3.28%
1990	80	−2.13%
1999	82	+0.27%
2007	82	+0.00%
2012	79	−0.74%
2017	131	+10.64%
2023	134	+0.38%
Source: INSEE

== See also ==
- Communes of the Ardennes department
