= Pure, Ardennes =

Pure
- Commune
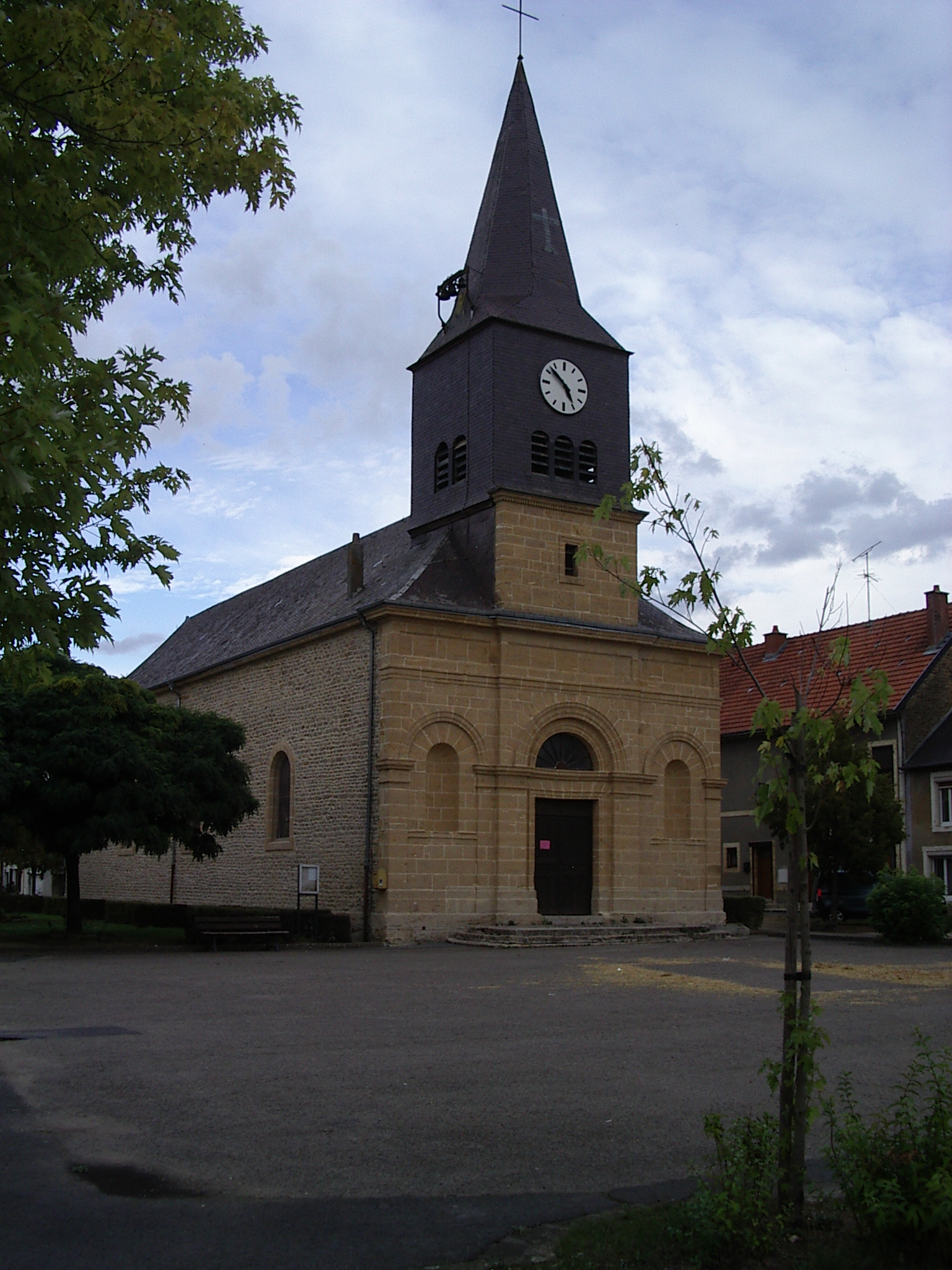
- The church in Pure

- Coat of arms
- Location of Pure
- Location within France Location within Grand Est
- Coordinates: 49°40′26″N 5°10′32″E
- Country: France
- Region: Grand Est
- Department: Ardennes
- Arrondissement: Sedan
- Canton: Carignan
- Intercommunality: Portes du Luxembourg

Government
  - Mayor (2020–2026): Yves Mozet
- Area^{1}: 6.5 km^{2} (2.5 sq mi)
- Elevation: 179 m (587 ft)
- Highest elevation: 286 m (938 ft)
- Lowest elevation: 179 m (587 ft)
- Population (2023): 570
  - Density: 88/km^{2} (230/sq mi)
- Time zone: UTC+01:00 (CET)
  - Summer (DST): UTC+02:00 (CEST)
- INSEE/Postal code: 08349 /08110
- ^{1} French Land Register data, which excludes lakes, ponds, glaciers > 1 km^{2} (0.386 sq mi or 247 acres) and river estuaries.

Pure (French pronunciation: [pyʁ]) is a commune in the Ardennes department and Grand Est region of north-eastern France.

== Population ==
Historical population
Year	Pop.	±% p.a.
1968	696	—
1975	694	−0.04%
1982	651	−0.91%
1990	619	−0.63%
1999	585	−0.63%
2007	625	+0.83%
2012	636	+0.35%
2017	604	−1.03%
2023	570	−0.96%
Source: INSEE

== See also ==
- Communes of the Ardennes department
