= Villers-devant-Mouzon =

- Commune
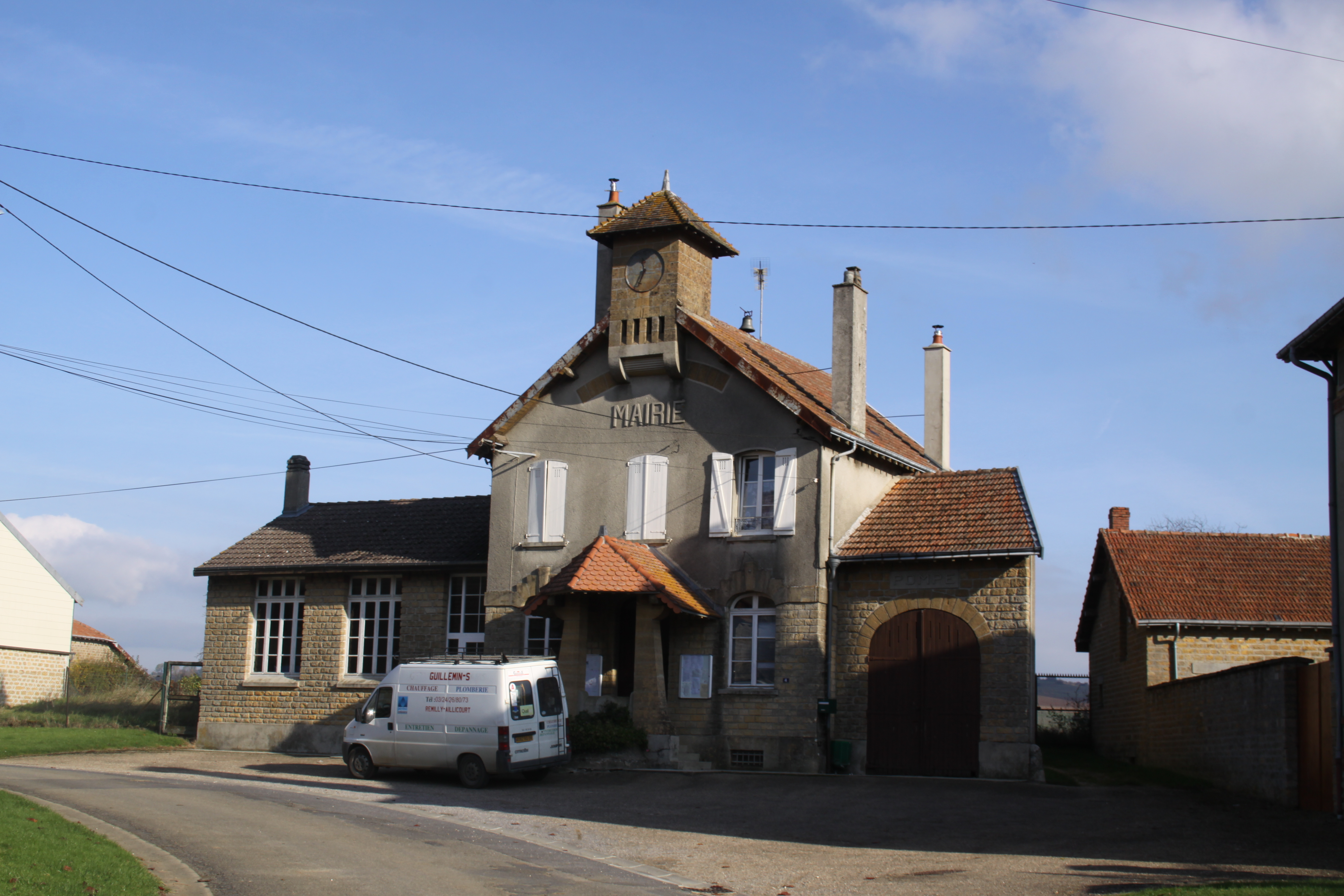
- Town hall

- Coat of arms
- Location of Villers-devant-Mouzon
- Location within France Location within Grand Est
- Coordinates: 49°37′30″N 5°01′53″E
- Country: France
- Region: Grand Est
- Department: Ardennes
- Arrondissement: Sedan
- Canton: Carignan

Government
  - Mayor (2020–2026): Ludovic Beaurain
- Area^{1}: 4.53 km^{2} (1.75 sq mi)
- Elevation: 165 m (541 ft)
- Population (2023): 102
  - Density: 22.5/km^{2} (58.3/sq mi)
- Time zone: UTC+01:00 (CET)
  - Summer (DST): UTC+02:00 (CEST)
- INSEE/Postal code: 08477 /08210
- ^{1} French Land Register data, which excludes lakes, ponds, glaciers > 1 km^{2} (0.386 sq mi or 247 acres) and river estuaries.

Villers-devant-Mouzon (French pronunciation: [vilɛʁ dəvɑ̃ muzɔ̃], literally Villers before Mouzon) is a commune in the Ardennes department in France.

== Population ==
Historical population
Year	Pop.	±% p.a.
1968	93	—
1975	69	−4.17%
1982	82	+2.50%
1990	130	+5.93%
1999	116	−1.26%
2007	113	−0.33%
2012	93	−3.82%
2017	101	+1.66%
2023	102	+0.16%
Source: INSEE

== See also ==
- Communes of the Ardennes department
