= Brévillers =

Brévillers may refer to:

- Brévillers, Pas-de-Calais, a commune in France
- Brévillers, Somme, a commune in France

== See also ==
- Bréville (disambiguation)
