= Escombres-et-le-Chesnois =

- Commune
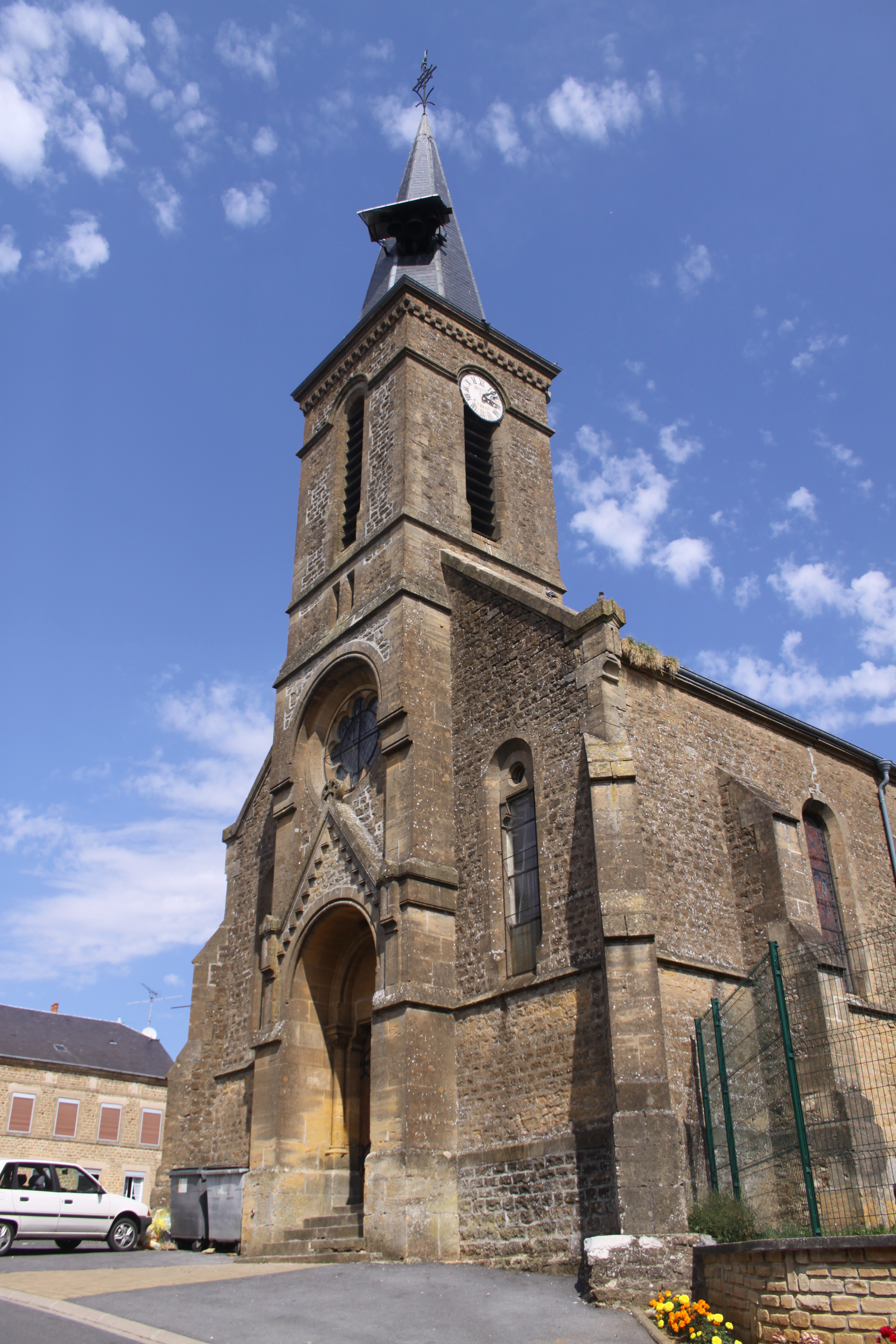
- The church in Escombres

- Coat of arms
- Location of Escombres-et-le-Chesnois
- Location within France Location within Grand Est
- Coordinates: 49°41′43″N 5°07′28″E
- Country: France
- Region: Grand Est
- Department: Ardennes
- Arrondissement: Sedan
- Canton: Carignan

Government
  - Mayor (2022–2026): Aurélie Body
- Area^{1}: 8.29 km^{2} (3.20 sq mi)
- Elevation: 250 m (820 ft)
- Population (2023): 342
  - Density: 41.3/km^{2} (107/sq mi)
- Time zone: UTC+01:00 (CET)
  - Summer (DST): UTC+02:00 (CEST)
- INSEE/Postal code: 08153 /08110
- ^{1} French Land Register data, which excludes lakes, ponds, glaciers > 1 km^{2} (0.386 sq mi or 247 acres) and river estuaries.

Escombres-et-le-Chesnois is a commune in the Ardennes department in northern France.

== Population ==
Historical population
Year	Pop.	±% p.a.
1968	303	—
1975	277	−1.27%
1982	240	−2.03%
1990	278	+1.85%
1999	282	+0.16%
2007	327	+1.87%
2012	361	+2.00%
2017	349	−0.67%
2023	342	−0.34%
Source: INSEE

== See also ==
- Communes of the Ardennes department
