= Linay =

- Commune
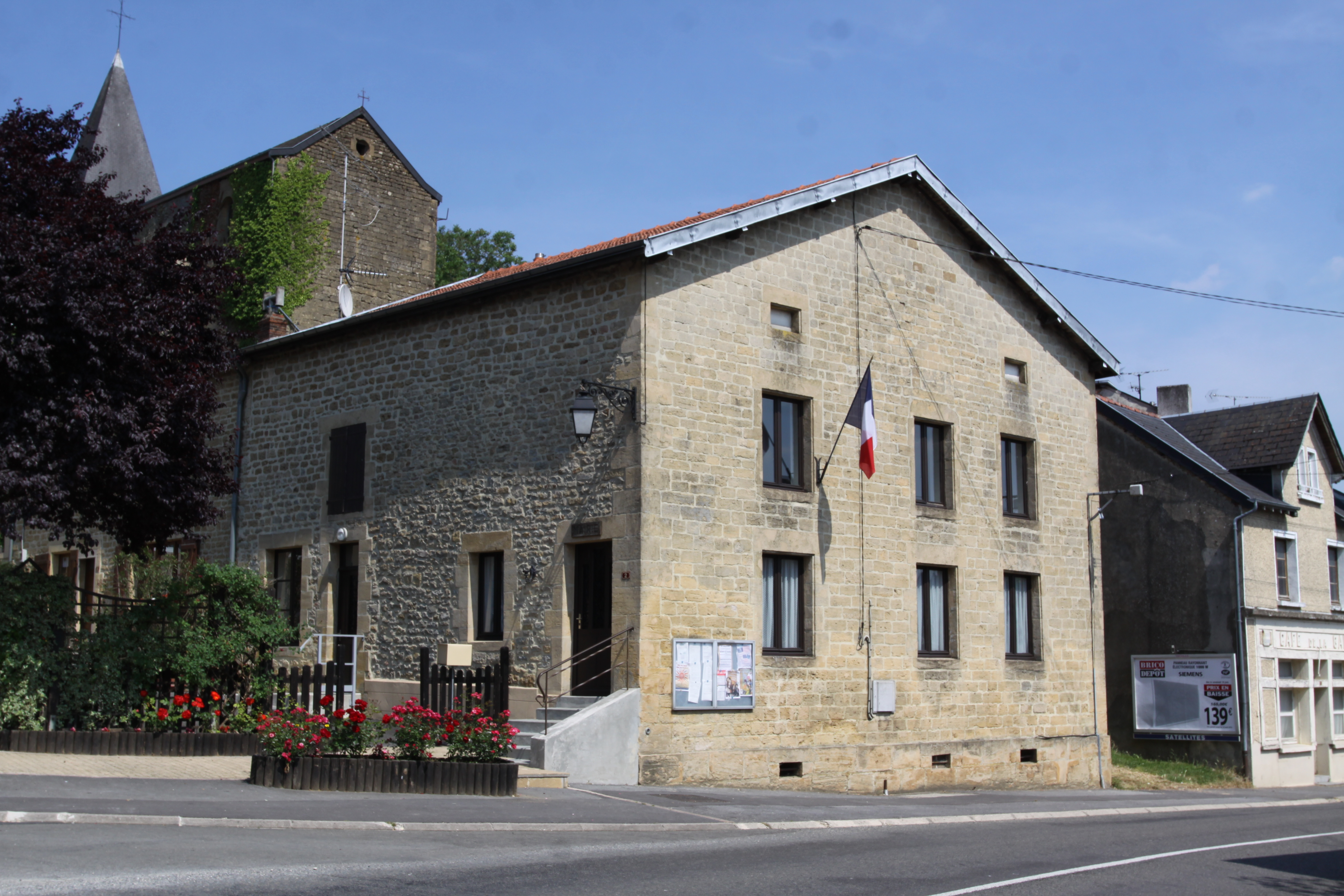
- The town hall in Linay

- Coat of arms
- Location of Linay
- Location within France Location within Grand Est
- Coordinates: 49°36′56″N 5°13′29″E
- Country: France
- Region: Grand Est
- Department: Ardennes
- Arrondissement: Sedan
- Canton: Carignan

Government
  - Mayor (2020–2026): Francis Annould
- Area^{1}: 7.28 km^{2} (2.81 sq mi)
- Elevation: 168 m (551 ft)
- Population (2023): 220
  - Density: 30/km^{2} (78/sq mi)
- Time zone: UTC+01:00 (CET)
  - Summer (DST): UTC+02:00 (CEST)
- INSEE/Postal code: 08255 /08110
- ^{1} French Land Register data, which excludes lakes, ponds, glaciers > 1 km^{2} (0.386 sq mi or 247 acres) and river estuaries.

Linay (French pronunciation: [linɛ]) is a commune in the Ardennes department in northern France.

== Population ==
Historical population
| Year | Pop. | ±% p.a. |
|---|---|---|
| 1968 | 303 | — |
| 1975 | 256 | −2.38% |
| 1982 | 222 | −2.02% |
| 1990 | 188 | −2.06% |
| 1999 | 210 | +1.24% |
| 2007 | 240 | +1.68% |
| 2012 | 252 | +0.98% |
| 2017 | 250 | −0.16% |
| 2023 | 220 | −2.11% |
Source: INSEE

== See also ==
- Communes of the Ardennes department
