= Sachy, Ardennes =

Sachy
- Commune
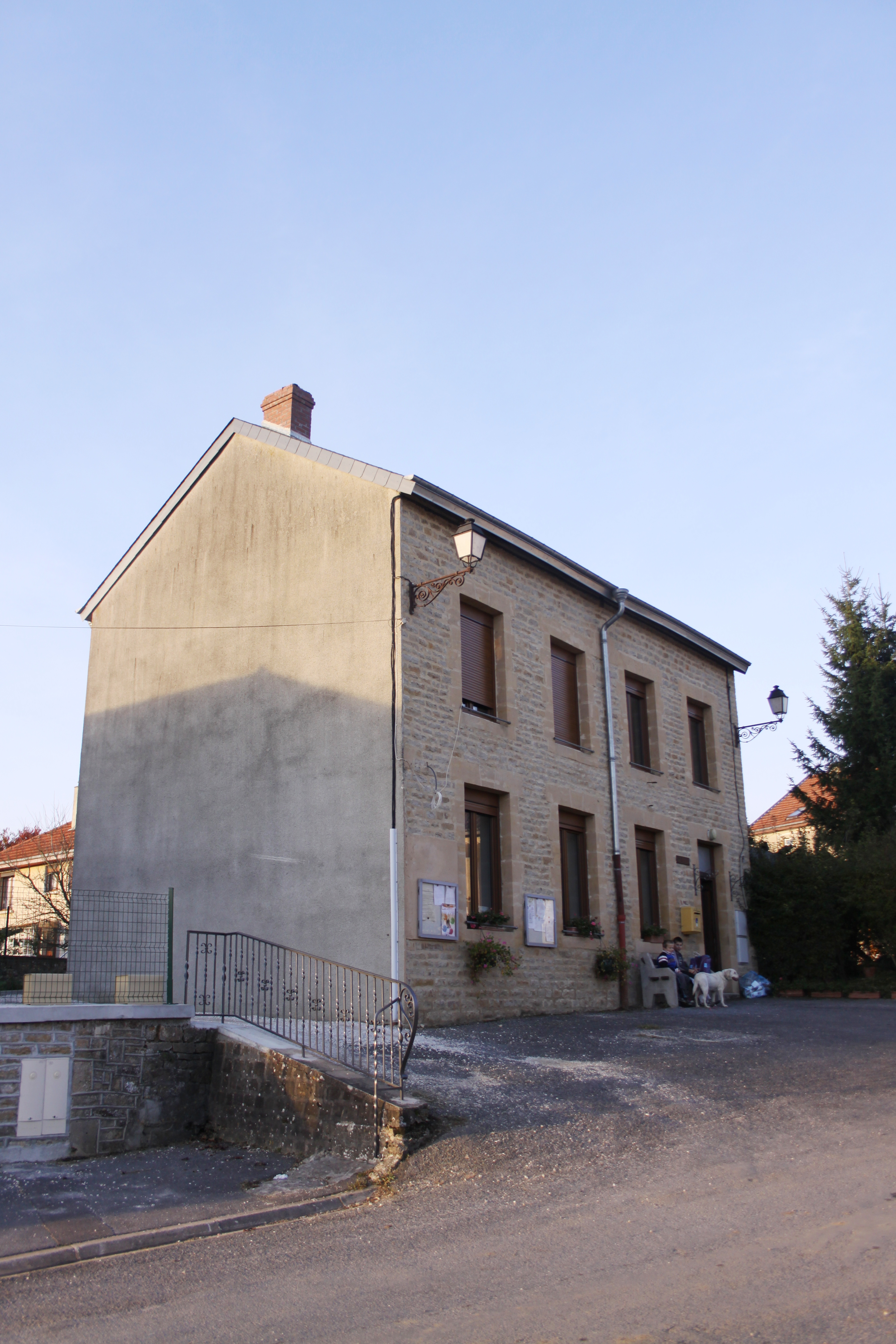
- Town hall

- Coat of arms
- Location of Sachy
- Location within France Location within Grand Est
- Coordinates: 49°40′09″N 5°08′01″E
- Country: France
- Region: Grand Est
- Department: Ardennes
- Arrondissement: Sedan
- Canton: Carignan
- Intercommunality: Portes du Luxembourg

Government
  - Mayor (2020–2026): Arlette Braconnier-Servais
- Area^{1}: 5.9 km^{2} (2.3 sq mi)
- Elevation: 161 m (528 ft)
- Population (2023): 175
  - Density: 30/km^{2} (77/sq mi)
- Time zone: UTC+01:00 (CET)
  - Summer (DST): UTC+02:00 (CEST)
- INSEE/Postal code: 08375 /08110
- ^{1} French Land Register data, which excludes lakes, ponds, glaciers > 1 km^{2} (0.386 sq mi or 247 acres) and river estuaries.

Sachy (French pronunciation: [saʃi]) is a commune in the Ardennes department in northern France.

== Population ==
Historical population
Year	Pop.	±% p.a.
1968	138	—
1975	119	−2.09%
1982	172	+5.40%
1990	150	−1.70%
1999	162	+0.86%
2007	161	−0.08%
2012	184	+2.71%
2017	182	−0.22%
2023	175	−0.65%
Source: INSEE

== See also ==
- Communes of the Ardennes department
