= Bièvres, Ardennes =

Bièvres
- Commune
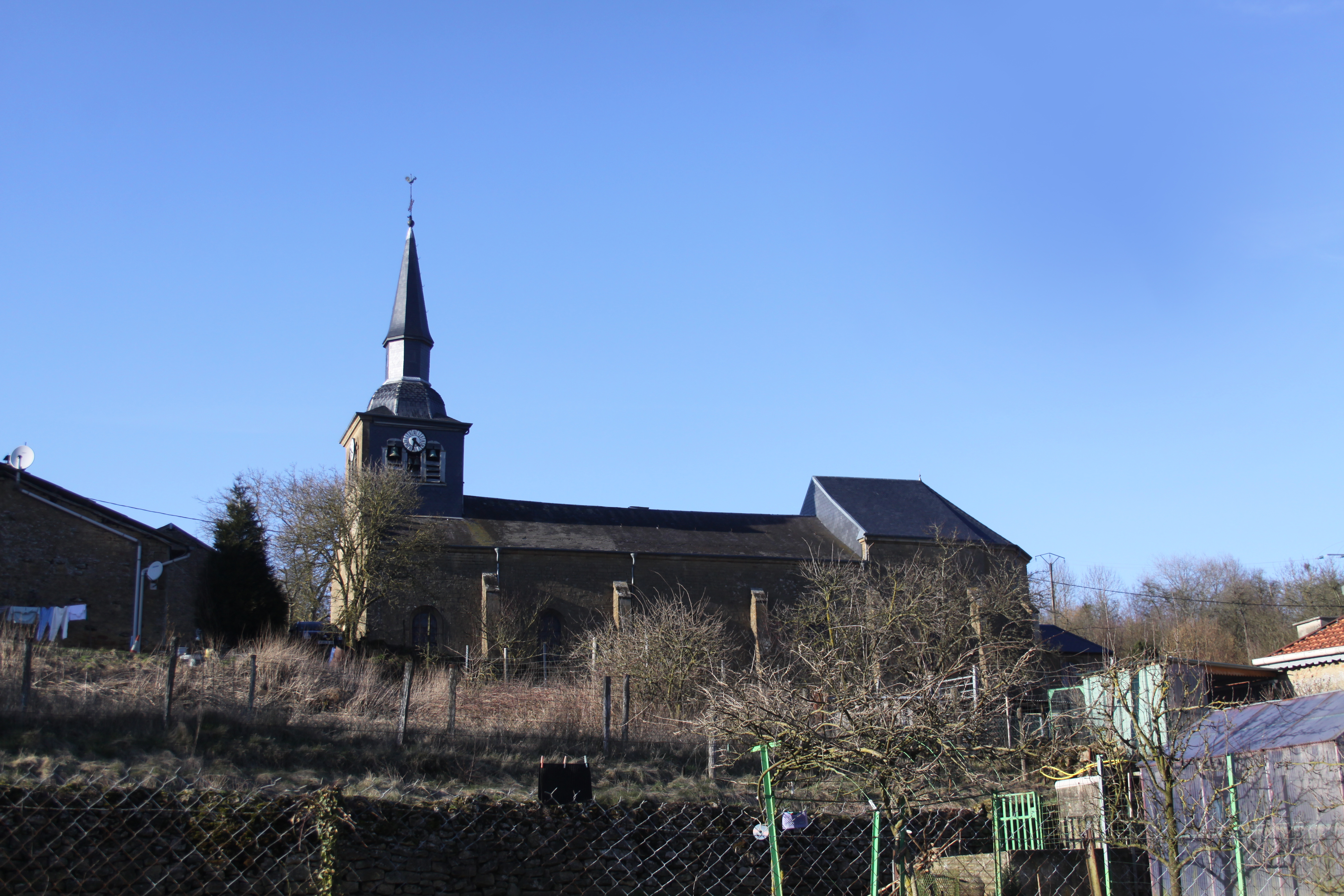
- The church in Bièvres

- Coat of arms
- Location of Bièvres
- Location within France Location within Grand Est
- Coordinates: 49°33′27″N 5°15′56″E
- Country: France
- Region: Grand Est
- Department: Ardennes
- Arrondissement: Sedan
- Canton: Carignan

Government
  - Mayor (2020–2026): Michel Vignol
- Area^{1}: 7.3 km^{2} (2.8 sq mi)
- Elevation: 241 m (791 ft)
- Highest elevation: 352 m (1,155 ft)
- Lowest elevation: 183 m (600 ft)
- Population (2023): 49
  - Density: 6.7/km^{2} (17/sq mi)
- Time zone: UTC+01:00 (CET)
  - Summer (DST): UTC+02:00 (CEST)
- INSEE/Postal code: 08065 /08370
- ^{1} French Land Register data, which excludes lakes, ponds, glaciers > 1 km^{2} (0.386 sq mi or 247 acres) and river estuaries.

Bièvres (French pronunciation: [bjɛvʁ]) is a commune in the Ardennes department in northern France.

== Population ==
Historical population
| Year | Pop. | ±% p.a. |
|---|---|---|
| 1968 | 119 | — |
| 1975 | 107 | −1.51% |
| 1982 | 87 | −2.91% |
| 1990 | 75 | −1.84% |
| 1999 | 66 | −1.41% |
| 2007 | 65 | −0.19% |
| 2012 | 59 | −1.92% |
| 2017 | 49 | −3.65% |
| 2023 | 49 | +0.00% |
Source: INSEE

== See also ==
- Communes of the Ardennes department
