= Létanne =

- Commune
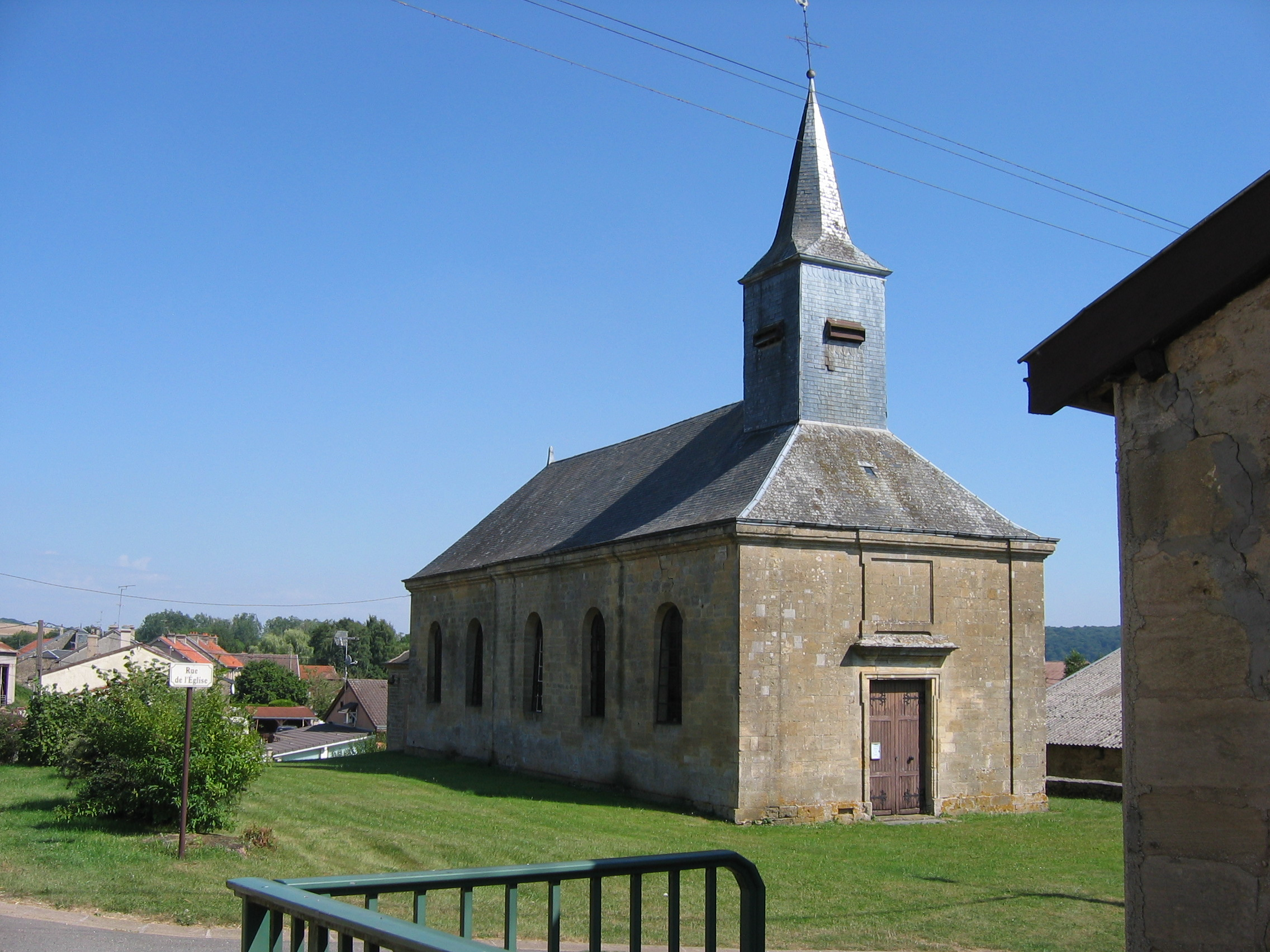
- The church in Létanne

- Coat of arms
- Location of Létanne
- Location within France Location within Grand Est
- Coordinates: 49°32′43″N 5°04′55″E
- Country: France
- Region: Grand Est
- Department: Ardennes
- Arrondissement: Sedan
- Canton: Carignan

Government
  - Mayor (2020–2026): Dominique Barré
- Area^{1}: 7.5 km^{2} (2.9 sq mi)
- Elevation: 162 m (531 ft)
- Population (2023): 107
  - Density: 14/km^{2} (37/sq mi)
- Time zone: UTC+01:00 (CET)
  - Summer (DST): UTC+02:00 (CEST)
- INSEE/Postal code: 08252 /08210
- ^{1} French Land Register data, which excludes lakes, ponds, glaciers > 1 km^{2} (0.386 sq mi or 247 acres) and river estuaries.

Létanne (French pronunciation: [letan]) is a commune in the Ardennes department in northern France.

== Population ==
Historical population
| Year | Pop. | ±% p.a. |
|---|---|---|
| 1968 | 123 | — |
| 1975 | 107 | −1.97% |
| 1982 | 106 | −0.13% |
| 1990 | 99 | −0.85% |
| 1999 | 104 | +0.55% |
| 2007 | 119 | +1.70% |
| 2012 | 144 | +3.89% |
| 2017 | 129 | −2.18% |
| 2023 | 107 | −3.07% |
Source: INSEE

== See also ==
- Communes of the Ardennes department
