= Osnes, Ardennes =

Osnes
- Commune
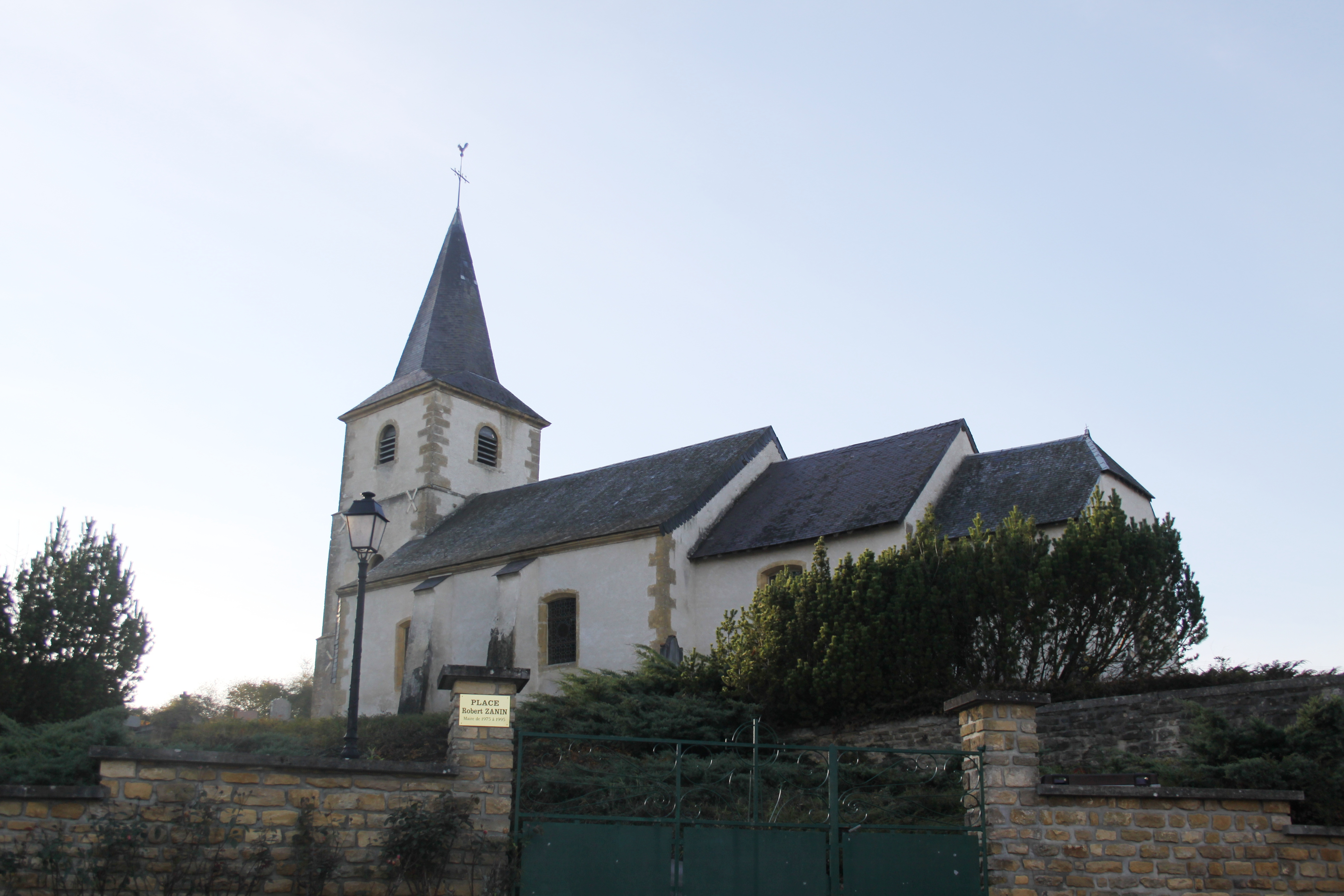
- The church in Osnes

- Coat of arms
- Location of Osnes
- Location within France Location within Grand Est
- Coordinates: 49°39′23″N 5°09′48″E
- Country: France
- Region: Grand Est
- Department: Ardennes
- Arrondissement: Sedan
- Canton: Carignan

Government
  - Mayor (2020–2026): Daniel Cola
- Area^{1}: 5.89 km^{2} (2.27 sq mi)
- Elevation: 162 m (531 ft)
- Highest elevation: 229 m (751 ft)
- Lowest elevation: 159 m (522 ft)
- Population (2023): 228
  - Density: 38.7/km^{2} (100/sq mi)
- Time zone: UTC+01:00 (CET)
  - Summer (DST): UTC+02:00 (CEST)
- INSEE/Postal code: 08336 /08110
- ^{1} French Land Register data, which excludes lakes, ponds, glaciers > 1 km^{2} (0.386 sq mi or 247 acres) and river estuaries.

Osnes (French pronunciation: [on]) is a commune in the Ardennes department in northern France.

== Population ==
Historical population
Year	Pop.	±% p.a.
1968	343	—
1975	367	+0.97%
1982	341	−1.04%
1990	274	−2.70%
1999	220	−2.41%
2007	228	+0.45%
2012	231	+0.26%
2017	230	−0.09%
2023	228	−0.15%
Source: INSEE

== See also ==
- Communes of the Ardennes department
