= Villy, Ardennes =

Villy
- Commune
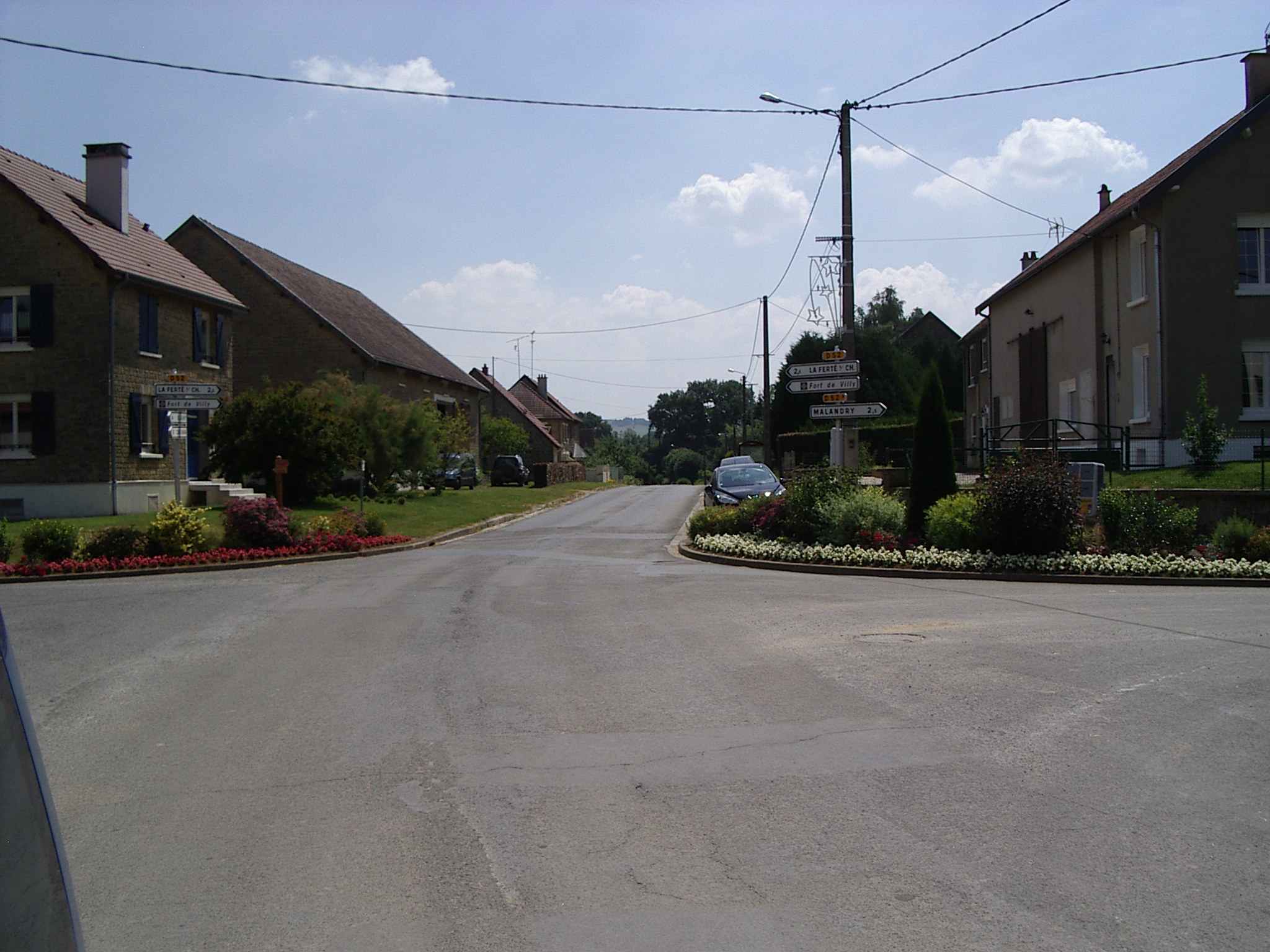
- A general view of Villy

- Coat of arms
- Location of Villy
- Location within France Location within Grand Est
- Coordinates: 49°35′40″N 5°13′36″E
- Country: France
- Region: Grand Est
- Department: Ardennes
- Arrondissement: Sedan
- Canton: Carignan

Government
  - Mayor (2020–2026): Richard Philbiche
- Area^{1}: 7.78 km^{2} (3.00 sq mi)
- Elevation: 144 m (472 ft)
- Population (2023): 191
  - Density: 24.6/km^{2} (63.6/sq mi)
- Time zone: UTC+01:00 (CET)
  - Summer (DST): UTC+02:00 (CEST)
- INSEE/Postal code: 08485 /08370
- ^{1} French Land Register data, which excludes lakes, ponds, glaciers > 1 km^{2} (0.386 sq mi or 247 acres) and river estuaries.

Villy is a commune in the Ardennes department in northern France.

== Population ==
Historical population
Year	Pop.	±% p.a.
1968	191	—
1975	172	−1.49%
1982	146	−2.31%
1990	151	+0.42%
1999	139	−0.92%
2007	184	+3.57%
2012	190	+0.64%
2017	215	+2.50%
2023	191	−1.95%
Source: INSEE

== See also ==
- Communes of the Ardennes department
