= Brévilly =

- Commune
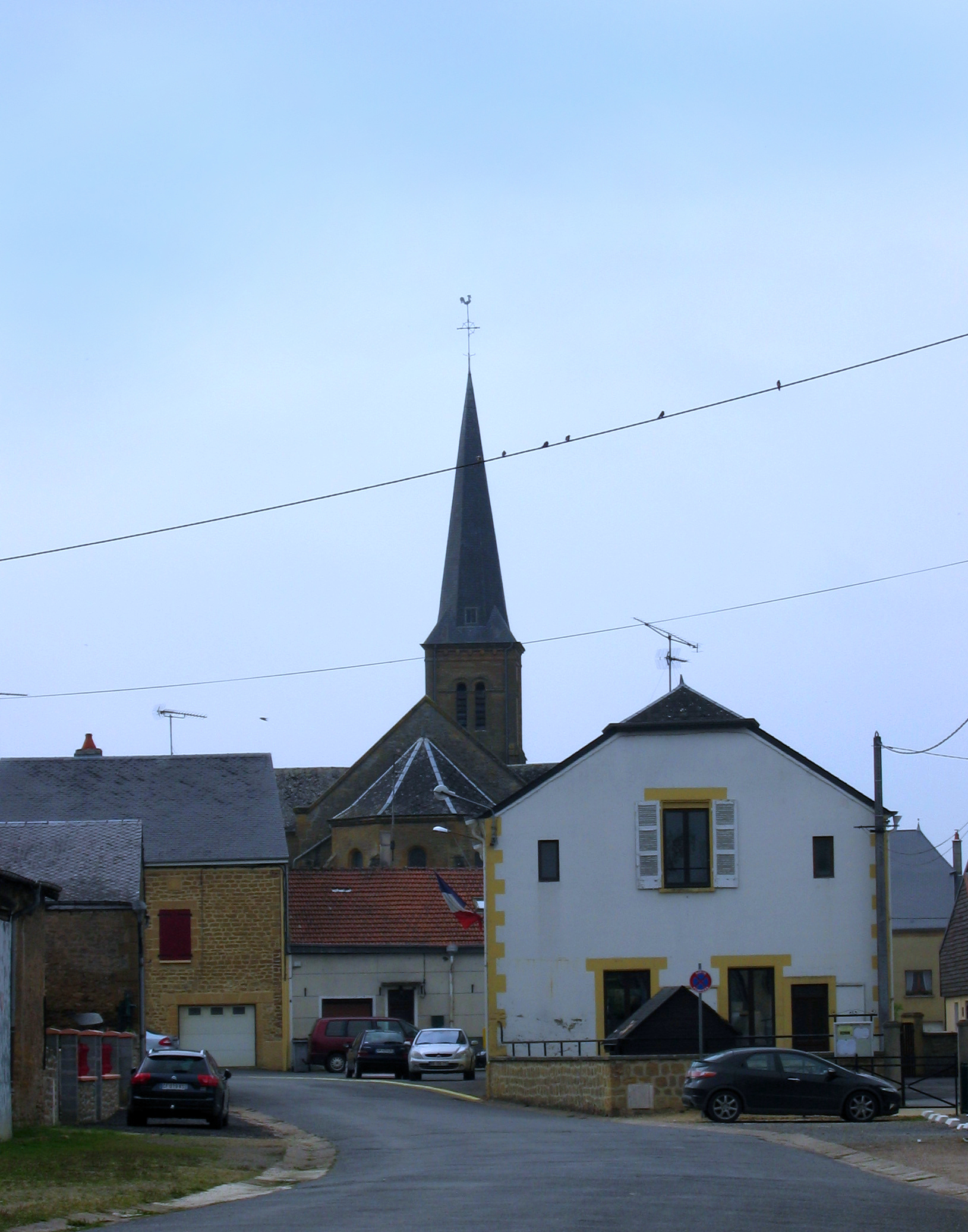
- A general view of Brévilly

- Coat of arms
- Location of Brévilly
- Location within France Location within Grand Est
- Coordinates: 49°39′50″N 5°04′46″E
- Country: France
- Region: Grand Est
- Department: Ardennes
- Arrondissement: Sedan
- Canton: Carignan

Government
  - Mayor (2020–2026): Olivier Hiblot
- Area^{1}: 7.3 km^{2} (2.8 sq mi)
- Elevation: 165 m (541 ft)
- Highest elevation: 257 m (843 ft)
- Lowest elevation: 156 m (512 ft)
- Population (2023): 366
  - Density: 50/km^{2} (130/sq mi)
- Time zone: UTC+01:00 (CET)
  - Summer (DST): UTC+02:00 (CEST)
- INSEE/Postal code: 08083 /08140
- ^{1} French Land Register data, which excludes lakes, ponds, glaciers > 1 km^{2} (0.386 sq mi or 247 acres) and river estuaries.

Brévilly is a commune in the Ardennes department in northern France.

== Population ==
Historical population
Year	Pop.	±% p.a.
1968	380	—
1975	384	+0.15%
1982	378	−0.22%
1990	403	+0.80%
1999	381	−0.62%
2007	393	+0.39%
2012	398	+0.25%
2017	367	−1.61%
2023	366	−0.05%
Source: INSEE

== See also ==
- Communes of the Ardennes department
