= Moiry, Ardennes =

Moiry
- Commune
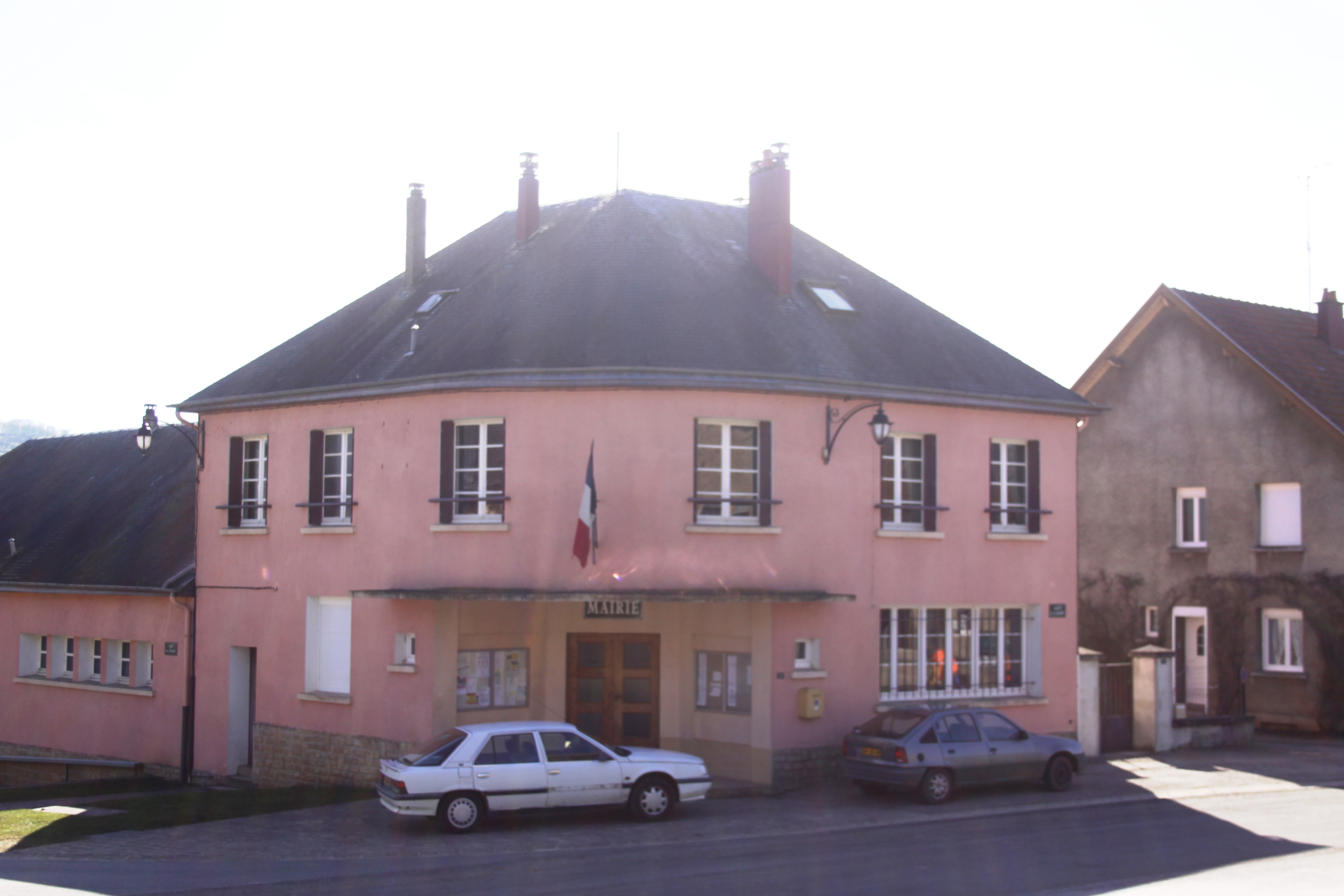
- Town hall

- Coat of arms
- Location of Moiry
- Location within France Location within Grand Est
- Coordinates: 49°35′34″N 5°16′38″E
- Country: France
- Region: Grand Est
- Department: Ardennes
- Arrondissement: Sedan
- Canton: Carignan

Government
  - Mayor (2020–2026): Jacqueline Pierre
- Area^{1}: 3.91 km^{2} (1.51 sq mi)
- Elevation: 178 m (584 ft)
- Population (2023): 133
  - Density: 34.0/km^{2} (88.1/sq mi)
- Time zone: UTC+01:00 (CET)
  - Summer (DST): UTC+02:00 (CEST)
- INSEE/Postal code: 08293 /08370
- ^{1} French Land Register data, which excludes lakes, ponds, glaciers > 1 km^{2} (0.386 sq mi or 247 acres) and river estuaries.

Moiry (French pronunciation: [mwaʁi]) is a commune in the Ardennes department in northern France.

== Population ==
Historical population
Year	Pop.	±% p.a.
1968	224	—
1975	190	−2.32%
1982	186	−0.30%
1990	173	−0.90%
1999	188	+0.93%
2007	185	−0.20%
2012	184	−0.11%
2017	148	−4.26%
2023	133	−1.77%
Source: INSEE

== See also ==
- Communes of the Ardennes department
