= Canton of Carignan =

Coordinates: 49.63°N 5.17°E

- Canton
- Situation of the canton of Carignan in the department of Ardennes
- Country: France
- Region: Grand Est
- Department: Ardennes
- No. of communes: {{{nbcomm}}}
- Population (2023): 15,590
- INSEE code: 0803

The canton of Carignan is an administrative division of the Ardennes department, northern France. Its borders were modified at the French canton reorganisation which came into effect in March 2015. Its seat is in Carignan.

It consists of the following communes:

1. Auflance
2. Autrecourt-et-Pourron
3. Beaumont-en-Argonne
4. Bièvres
5. Blagny
6. Brévilly
7. Carignan
8. Les Deux-Villes
9. Douzy
10. Escombres-et-le-Chesnois
11. Euilly-et-Lombut
12. La Ferté-sur-Chiers
13. Fromy
14. Herbeuval
15. Létanne
16. Linay
17. Malandry
18. Margny
19. Margut
20. Matton-et-Clémency
21. Messincourt
22. Mogues
23. Moiry
24. Mouzon
25. Osnes
26. Puilly-et-Charbeaux
27. Pure
28. Sachy
29. Sailly
30. Sapogne-sur-Marche
31. Signy-Montlibert
32. Tétaigne
33. Tremblois-lès-Carignan
34. Vaux-lès-Mouzon
35. Villers-devant-Mouzon
36. Villy
37. Williers
38. Yoncq
