= Battle of Sedan (1940) =

WWII battle during the Battle of France

- Part of the Battle of France in the Western Front of World War II
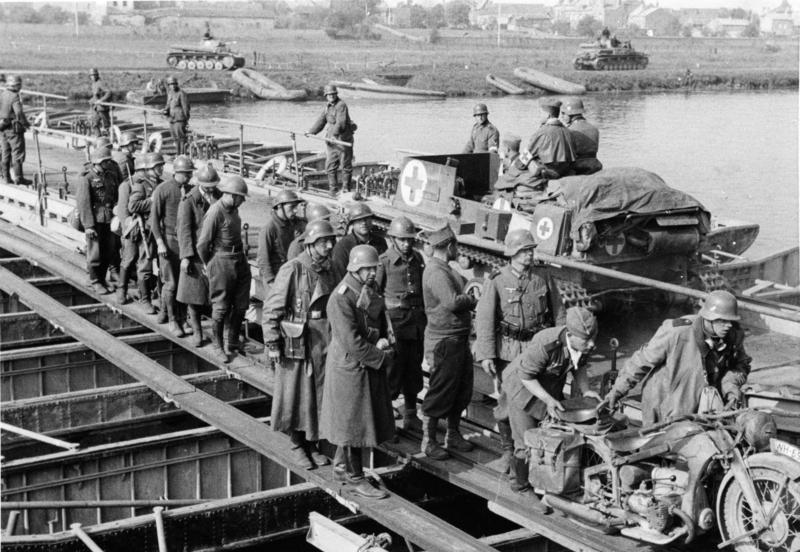
- German troops with French prisoners crossing the Meuse on 15 May 1940 near Sedan
Date	12–17 May 1940
Location	Sedan and the surrounding area, France 49°42′9″N 4°56′33″E
Result	German victory

Belligerents
France; United Kingdom	Germany

Commanders and leaders
Maurice Gamelin; (French Third Republic) Charles Huntziger; (French Third Republic) Henri Giraud (POW); Pierre Lafontaine; (French Third Republic) Marcel Têtu; (French Third Republic) André Corap; (French Third Republic) Col. Poncelet †; Patrick Playfair	Gerd von Rundstedt; Ewald von Kleist; Heinz Guderian; W. von Richthofen; Bruno Loerzer; (Nazi Germany) Heinrich Krampf; Karl Weisenberger; Friedrich Kirchner; Rudolf Veiel; (Nazi Germany) Ferdinand Schaal

Strength
20,000 men; 300 tanks; 174 artillery pieces; 152 bombers: 250 fighter aircraft	60,000 men; 41,000 vehicles; 771 tanks; 1,470 aircraft; 141 artillery pieces; 96 rubber boats

Casualties and losses
5,000+ killed, wounded, or captured; 167 aircraft	5,067 killed or wounded (12–17 May); at least 81 rubber boats

The Battle of Sedan or Second Battle of Sedan (12–15 May 1940) took place in World War II during the Battle of France in 1940. It was part of the German Wehrmacht's operational plan codenamed Fall Gelb (Case Yellow) for an offensive through the hilly and forested Ardennes to encircle the Allied armies in Belgium and north-eastern France. German Army Group A crossed the Meuse with the intention of capturing Sedan and pushing westwards towards the Channel coast, to trap the Allied forces that were advancing east into Belgium as part of the Allied Dyle Plan.

Sedan is situated on the east bank of the Meuse. Its capture gave the Germans a base from which to take the Meuse bridges and cross the river. They then advanced across the open and undefended French countryside to the English Channel. On 12 May, Sedan was captured without resistance and the Germans defeated the French defences around Sedan on the west bank of the Meuse. German Luftwaffe bombing and low morale prevented the French defenders from destroying the bridgeheads. On 14 May, the British Royal Air Force (RAF) and the French Armée de l'Air jointly tried to destroy the bridgeheads, but the Luftwaffe prevented them from doing so. In large air battles, the Allies suffered high losses which depleted Allied bomber strength in the campaign.

The French counter-attacked the German bridgeheads from 15 to 17 May, but the offensives fell victim to delay and confusion. On 20 May, five days after consolidating their bridgeheads, the German Army reached the Channel. Crossing the Meuse had enabled the Germans to achieve the operational goal of Fall Gelb and encircle the strongest Allied armies, including the British Expeditionary Force. The resulting June battles destroyed the remaining French army as an effective fighting force and drove the British from the continent, leading to the defeat of France.

== Background ==
=== German plan ===
On 10 May 1940, the Wehrmacht invaded Luxembourg, Netherlands and Belgium. In the Netherlands, the Germans made steady progress. By 12 May, units of the German Army Group B were closing on Rotterdam and Amsterdam, while in central Belgium the Germans were close to reaching the Dyle river east of Brussels. In response, the Allied First Army Group, under the command of Gaston Billotte, containing the French Seventh Army, French Ninth Army, French First Army and the British Expeditionary Force, advanced to the Dyle river to form a solid front line as part of the Dyle Plan, a defensive strategy to halt the German advances in Belgium. However, the offensive by Army Group B was a diversion.

The main thrust of Fall Gelb was conducted by Army Group A through the Ardennes in Luxembourg and southern Belgium. Once these lightly defended areas were traversed, Army Group A's XIX Panzerkorps (19th Tank Corps), under the command of Heinz Guderian, struck into France at Sedan, located on the Meuse river. Its capture enabled a German advance into the undefended interior of France and to the English Channel, behind the Allied mobile forces advancing into Belgium. The result was a strategic encirclement.

For the offensive, the Oberkommando der Wehrmacht (German High Command) gave Army Group A the most powerful concentration of German armour and motorised forces. Although Army Group B was allocated 808 tanks, over 1/4 of the total German tanks, they were largely light tanks such as the Panzer I and Panzer II, as opposed to the Panzer III and Panzer IV. The heavier tanks were assigned to Army Group A, as it required the best machines to conduct the critical operation at Sedan. Army Group A had 1,753 tanks of the heavier types.

=== 'Impenetrable' Ardennes ===
Following the First World War, the French General Staff had ruled out the idea of a future German thrust through the Ardennes–Sedan sector. They were certain such terrain could not be crossed by tanks. Marshal Philippe Pétain described them as "impenetrable", while French general Maurice Gamelin described the geographical feature as "Europe's best tank obstacle". The "barrier" of the Meuse and Ardennes appeared to be a sound strategic defence feature that a future enemy could not get through or go around. The French concluded that, at best, a German assault through the Ardennes towards Sedan could not reach the Meuse for two weeks, and would take between five to nine days to penetrate the Ardennes alone.

The French assessments were less credible in the light of military exercises carried out in 1938. That year, General André-Gaston Prételat took command of manoeuvres which created a scenario whereby the German Army launched an assault with seven divisions, including four motorised infantry divisions (the type of the remaining three are not given) and two tank brigades. The "French" side's defences collapsed. "The result was a defeat of so comprehensive a nature that the wisdom of publishing it was questioned lest morale be damaged." As late as March 1940, a French report to Gamelin named the defences at Sedan, the last "fortified" position on the Meuse, and the last before the open country of France, as "entirely inadequate." Prételat had correctly identified the landscape as relatively easy terrain for armour to cross. At most, he concluded, the Germans would need 60 hours to reach the Meuse and one day to cross it. This estimate was to prove inaccurate by just three hours; the Germans achieved the Meuse crossing after just 57 hours.

The French Army authorised strengthening of the fortifications in the autumn of 1939, but severe winter weather prevented the pouring of concrete and the delivery of the necessary materials. On 11 April 1940, General Charles Huntziger asked for another four divisions to work on the defences but was denied.

=== French defences at Sedan ===
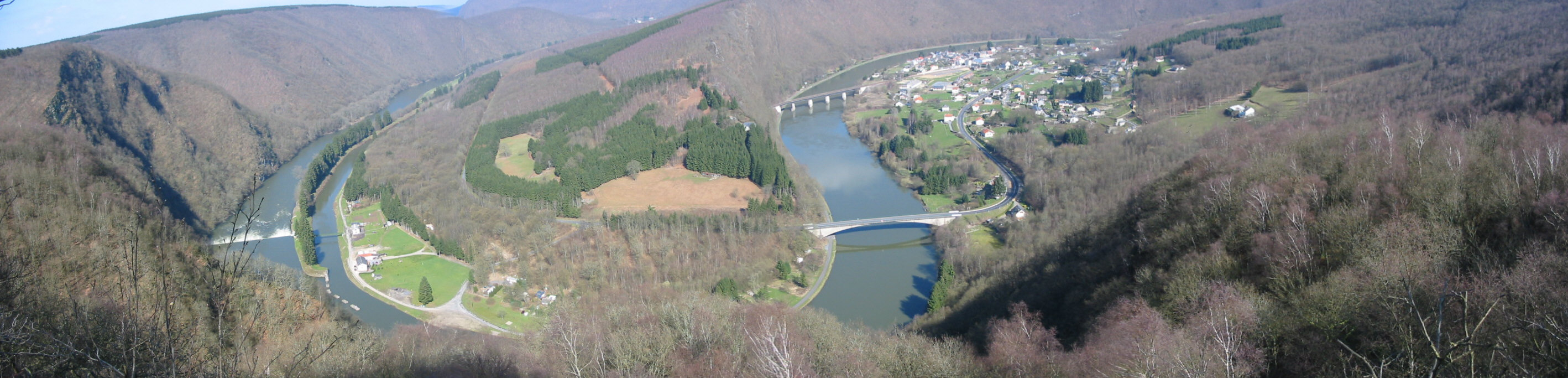
View of the Meuse in the French Ardennes

The French defences at Sedan had been neglected and were weak. The French had long believed that the German Army would not attack through the Sedan sector, and only Brigadier General Henri Lafontaine's French 55th Infantry Division, a category B division, was allocated to this sector. The Maginot Line ended 20 kilometres (12 mi) east of Sedan at La Ferté, with Fort No. 505 as its westernmost component. Sedan was a part of the extended Maginot Line that ran north behind the Meuse river. Between Sedan and La Ferté lay the Stenay gap, a stretch of unprotected terrain not covered by French defences or natural obstacles. This was the reason a significant number of French generals insisted on strengthening this sector, while ignoring Sedan.

As the French constructed further fortifications, Luftwaffe reconnaissance aircraft detected the activity and reported it. The steep slopes on the banks of the Meuse, added to what appeared in photographic reconnaissance to be a formidable barrier of bunkers and defence lines, caused Colonel-General Gerd von Rundstedt, the commander in chief of Army Group A, to question the wisdom of Guderian in choosing Sedan as the point of maximum effort. To identify how strong these fortifications were, a team of photographic specialists were called in to evaluate the pictures. Their analysis concluded that what appeared to be strong fortified positions were just the construction sites of half-built bunkers that were, to all intents and purposes, empty shells. The contribution of the specialists tilted the Sedan attack plan in Guderian's favour.

General Huntziger was happy to rely on "concrete" to ensure the safety of Sedan, as he had rejected the idea that the Germans would attack through the Ardennes. The Second Army built 52,000 cubic metres (1,800,000 cu ft) of concrete fortifications along its front, but very little in the Sedan sector. Only 42 bunkers protected the Sedan bridgeheads on the outbreak of war in September 1939 and an additional 61 were built by 10 May. However, by 10 May, most of the bunkers were incomplete, lacking gun port shutters for the artillery casemates. Some of the bunkers lacked rear doors, making them vulnerable to infiltration by infantry. To the north of Sedan, on the northern bend of the Meuse, the town of Glaire overlooked the crossing points on the river, which was to be where the German armour would deliver its heaviest blow. There was a gap of 2 kilometres (1.2 mi) between Bunker 305 at Glaire and Bunker 211 next to the Pont Neuf bridge. This allowed an attacker coming from the north to use the good roads along the Fleigneux–Saint-Menges–Glaire axis to enter Sedan from the north.

The defences at Sedan also lacked any mines. The French Second Army was guarding a front of 70 kilometres (43 mi), and was given only 16,000 mines. Of that number, 7,000 were given to the cavalry divisions that were intended to delay a German advance through southern Belgium, as well as to blockhouse points along the Franco–Belgian border. That left 2,000 for the defence of the Meuse. Of those, the 55th Infantry Division got 422. Not all of these were laid, and some barriers were moved during the bunker construction in the Sedan sector.

=== German approach ===
As the German Army advanced through southern Belgium on 12 May, General Ewald von Kleist and Guderian clashed over where the main point of attack should be. Kleist was Guderian's immediate superior, commanding Panzergruppe von Kleist, consisting of XLI and XIX Panzer Corps (under Guderian). Kleist pressed for Flize, further west than Sedan. Kleist argued that the blow would avoid a double river crossing at the Meuse (at Sedan) and Ardennes canal (to the west of Sedan). Moreover, the blow would strike at the dividing line between the French Ninth and Second armies. Guderian saw things differently, and pointed out that a thrust along the lines of Kleist's plan would put the flank of the advance within range of the fortress artillery at Charleville-Mézières, some 25 kilometres (16 mi) north-west of Sedan. The shift of operations further north would also disperse concentration (or Schwerpunkt) and disrupt the intense planning of the German tactical units, which had been in training for the Sedan attack and an advance north-west for months. He also felt that regrouping in front of Sedan would delay the assault for 24 hours and allow the French to bring up reinforcements. Kleist agreed that such a delay was unacceptable, so he agreed to Guderian's plan.

Nevertheless, while Kleist accepted the folly of choosing Flize, he insisted the offensive concentration point should be made west of the Ardennes Canal. Kleist reaffirmed this in a letter to Guderian on 18 April, but when operations began Guderian ignored this completely. He had wanted a large, 20-kilometre (12 mi) bridgehead at Sedan and the rapid occupation of Stonne and the high ground surrounding Sedan.

Guderian's plan for 13 May was straightforward. The 2nd Panzer Division in the north was to form the right flank of the assaulting force when it reached the Meuse near Donchery. The 1st Panzer Division, reinforced by the Infantry Regiment Großdeutschland, a battalion of assault engineers, and divisional artillery of the 2nd and 10th Panzer Divisions, was to make the main attack by crossing the Meuse just north of Sedan and seizing the Heights of la Marfee overlooking the city. The 10th Panzer Division was to cross the Meuse south of Sedan and protect the southern flank of the corps. Throughout the day, large masses of troops and equipment assembled north of the Meuse in preparation for the river crossing.

== Forces involved ==
=== German forces ===
The German forces consisted of the 1st, 2nd and 10th Panzer Divisions. The 1st Panzer Division, under the command of General-Major (Major General) Friedrich Kirchner, had on strength 52 Panzer IIs, 98 Panzer IIIs, 58 Panzer IVs, 40 Panzer 35(t)s and eight Sd.Kfz. 265 Panzerbefehlswagens. The 2nd, under the command of Generalleutnant (Lieutenant General) Rudolf Veiel, had 45 Panzer Is, 115 Panzer IIs, 59 Panzer IIIs and 32 Panzer IVs. It also had 16 Sd.Kfz. 265s. The 10th, under the command of Generalleutnant Ferdinand Schaal, had 44 Panzer Is, 113 Panzer IIs, 58 Panzer IIIs, 32 Panzer IVs and 18 Sd.Kfz. 265s. In total Guderian commanded three out of eight divisions that Panzer Group Kleist had, consisting of up to 60,000 infantry troops, 41,000 vehicles, 788 tanks and 141 artillery pieces. He could also call upon 1,470 aircraft.

Part of Guderian's problem was the lack of mobile artillery. He had no intention of halting a breakout to wait for additional artillery units to be moved into place to assault Sedan. Instead, he requested maximum support from the Luftwaffe. For the first few days, the German air arm would be used mostly in support of Army Group B. Most of the that was to be provided by Luftflotte 3 (Air Fleet 3). Initially, only limited numbers of air units were to be used, but the Luftwaffe's workload was greatly increased as the battle neared. The Luftwaffe was to commit I. Fliegerkorps (1st Air Corps under Ulrich Grauert), II. Fliegerkorps (under Bruno Loerzer), V. Fliegerkorps (under Robert Ritter von Greim), and VIII. Fliegerkorps (under Wolfram Freiherr von Richthofen). These units came from Luftflotte 2 and Jagdfliegerführer 3 (Fighter Leader 3). The most significant unit was VIII. Fliegerkorps, nicknamed the Nahkampf-Fliegerkorps (Close Support Air Corps), which contained Sturzkampfgeschwader 77 (Dive bomber Wing 77), a powerful concentration of dive-bomber units equipped with the Junkers Ju 87 Stuka precision ground attack aircraft. This powerful air concentration numbered some 1,470 aircraft: 600 Heinkel He 111 and Junkers Ju 88 medium bombers and Dornier Do 17 light bombers, 250 Ju 87s, 500 Messerschmitt Bf 109s and 120 Messerschmitt Bf 110s.

=== French forces ===
In the sector of Longwy, Sedan and Namur, where the Ardennes and the Meuse meet, the Ninth Army and Second Army were made up chiefly of poor quality divisions. Reinforcements were minimal, and those units were equipped with obsolete weapons. The resources at the disposal of the two Series B divisions, the 55th and later 71st Infantry Divisions, which would bear the brunt of the attack, were weak. They had almost no regular officers, and they had not experienced contact with the enemy.

The 55th Infantry Division guarding Sedan had little time for combat training, as it had been assigned construction work. It consisted mainly of reservists, most of them over the age of 30. Little attempt had been made to improve the poor combat quality of the division. One officer, First Lieutenant Delas of the 1st Battalion 147th Fortress Infantry Regiment, was arrested and confined for 15 days for ordering firing practice with a 25mm anti-tank gun in a nearby quarry. The division's commanding officer, General Lafontaine, put more faith in fortifications than training, as he believed they would compensate for the weakness of the division. The soldiers lacked the confidence and will to fight when the battle took place.

The organisation of the French 55th Infantry Division was chaotic. Most units had been involved in construction work and were constantly moved to different tactical positions. Of the nine companies in position by 10 May, only a few had been holding their respective positions for even a few days and were not familiar with them. One of the premier infantry regiments, the 213th Infantry Regiment, was removed from the line altogether and replaced by the 331st Regiment. In some cases, infantry regiments were made up of several companies from different battalions from different regiments. For example, the 295th Infantry Regiment's 6th Company, 2nd Battalion, was made up of four companies which were drawn from three different battalions belonging to three different regiments.

Such actions damaged the cohesion of the units that were initially strong. The 147th Fortress Regiment was the backbone of the 55th Infantry Division and was to occupy the bunker positions on the Meuse. At the start of mobilisation, the unit had high morale and very good cohesion. Because of the constant changes in organisation, however, the unit's battalions were "torn apart again and again".

To relieve the 55th Infantry Division, the French 71st Infantry Division was ordered out of reserve and into the frontline. The presence of the 71st Infantry shortened the front from 20 to 14 kilometres (12.4 to 8.7 mi) along the Meuse. This would increase the density of fighting strength in the immediate area, but the move was only partially done by 10 May, as it was scheduled to be completed on 13–14 May, three days after the German attack. Although the two divisions had 174 artillery pieces, more than the German forces opposing them, they had to share that force between them. Both divisions were short of anti-tank and anti-aircraft guns, a critical shortcoming.

== Crossing the Meuse ==
=== Capture of Sedan ===
Battle of Sedan (12 May 1940), base map from Openstreetmap, as of 2021

Battle of Sedan (13 May 1940), base map from Openstreetmap, as of 2021

The main problem confronting Guderian and his Sedan strategy was inadequate artillery support. Several batteries were stuck in traffic in the Ardennes, and he could not rely on the artillery batteries of his panzer divisions alone. Everything depended on the support of the Luftwaffe. General der Flieger Hugo Sperrle, commander of Luftflotte 3, had planned a conventional brief bombardment before the ground forces moved in. After preparatory raids, the medium and dive bombers were to smash the French defences in a concentrated blow lasting 20 minutes. The raid was planned for 16:00 before the infantry crossed the Meuse. In collaboration, II. Fliegerkorps had developed the concept of the rolling raid with Guderian. The idea of a single massed strike was abandoned, and the German air units were to attack in small formations but constantly through the day. It was deemed the effect would be threefold: the French artillery would be eliminated, the effect of continuous raids would lower enemy morale, and smaller formations would be more systematic and accurate against targets such as bunkers.

Unknown to Guderian, von Kleist, his immediate superior, had contacted Loerzer and rejected Guderian's proposed approach in favour of one big assault. Guderian complained. Kleist ignored him. Yet, the following morning Loerzer went ahead with the Guderian's rolling bombing. Loerzer would later say that Sperrle's official order had arrived too late to make changes.

By nightfall on 12 May, Guderian's XIX. Panzerkorps had rolled into Sedan. Guderian reported there was no sign of the enemy. With the city itself secured, he would now have to strike south, across the defended rear behind Sedan, which in turn was protected by a large bunker complex on Marfee ridge, a piece of high ground covering the Sedan-Meuse river to the south. But there were three fundamental choices. He could obey tactical necessity and protect the bridgeheads against a French counter-attack from the south; he could strike west-south-west towards Paris; or he could dash to the Channel. Remembering the Chief of Operations, 1st Panzer Division, Walther Wenck's saying, "Hit with your fists, don't feel with your fingers!", Guderian decided on the last option.

In the early hours of 13 May, the 10th Panzer Division slipped into position upstream to the north-east of Sedan, ready to strike at its designated crossing point near the town of Wadelincourt. Downstream, the 2nd Panzer Division moved into position to cross at Donchery. The 1st Panzer Division prepared to strike at the Gaulier bridgehead, near Floing, in the centre of Sedan's tactical front. It was on the northern bend of the Sedan-Meuse loop between Gaulier and Wadelincourt that the Luftwaffe was to make its maximum effort. To supplement his air support, Guderian stripped most of his panzer divisions of their artillery, which he then positioned directly opposite Gaulier. However, the artillery regiments lacked ammunition. A sustained and damaging bombardment was impossible. The Luftwaffe was going to have to do most of the work. Guderian reported that his corps had only 141 artillery pieces, against the French 174. To the north and south of Sedan, The French X and French XXXXI Corps (at the artillery fortress at Charleville-Mézières) could also add their artillery and shell Guderian's panzer units as they crossed the bridgeheads. The slow advance of artillery units to the front added to the German numerical inferiority, which was now 1:3. Only in the afternoon did the German artillery make an appearance, but with little effect. The 2nd Panzer Division was forced to attack without artillery support. For these reasons, Guderian had decided the outcome depended on the quality of air support, acting as flying artillery.

=== Luftwaffe assault ===
Luftflotte 3 and Luftflotte 2 (Albert Kesselring), executed the heaviest air bombardment the world had yet witnessed and the most intense by the Luftwaffe during the war. The Luftwaffe committed two Sturzkampfgeschwader (dive bomber wings) to the assault, flying 300 sorties against French positions, with Sturzkampfgeschwader 77 alone flying 201 sorties. A total of 3,940 sorties were flown by nine Kampfgeschwader (bomber wing) units, often in Gruppe strength.

The aerial assault lasted eight hours, from 08:00-16:00. Loerzer and Richthofen committed two Stuka units to the attack. Loerzer's Ju 87s flew some 180 missions against Sedan's bunkers, whilst Richthofen's managed 90. The nine Kampfgruppen (bomber wings) of II. Fliegerkorps flew 900 missions against the 360 of VIII. Fliegerkorps. VIII. Fliegerkorps's total mission count on the Meuse front was 910 compared to II. Fliegerkorps 1,770 .

The Luftwaffe's target was the Marfee heights, which were behind Sedan to the south-west. They contained the fortified artillery positions and dominated the approaches to the strategic and operational depths beyond Sedan and the Meuse. The Luftwaffe was two hours late, but the effort made was considerable. The attacks were made in Gruppe (group) strength and against the line of maximum resistance along the enemy gun line. To restrict enemy movements and communications, German fighters swept the area to cut land-lines and strafe fortifications, with some shooting of radio antennae off command posts. The attacks isolated the forward defence lines. Sturzkampfgeschwader 77 struck first in the morning of 13 May. In just five hours, 500 Ju 87 sorties had been flown. The Luftwaffe cowed the defenders, breaking them psychologically. The gunners, the backbone of the defences, had abandoned their positions by the time the German ground assault began. The cost to the Luftwaffe was just six aircraft, three of them Ju 87s.

The French 55th Infantry Division was not prepared for such an attack. French soldiers commented on the massive psychological effect of the bombardment, in particular the sirens of the Ju 87s. After the war, it was discovered that none of the bunkers had been destroyed by direct hits. Moreover, there were just 56 French casualties. It was the indirect effect that did the damage. The telecommunication cables were destroyed (most having been laid out in the open) through bombing, paralysing the division's communications, and the psychological damage crippled its defensive capacity.

The psychological damage contributed to "the panic of Bulson". At about 19:00 on 13 May, a report by a French artillery observer was passed on incorrectly. There was a rumour that German tanks were approaching the village of Bulson. The false reports spread, and the French 55th Infantry Division deserted their positions. German sources say that the first German tank crossed the Meuse 12 hours later. By the time the error was realised, most of the artillerymen and infantrymen had abandoned their heavy equipment.

=== 1st Panzer Division at Gaulier ===
German advance by 14 May 1940.

The central ground assault was to be conducted by the 1st Panzer Division and supported by the Infantry Regiment Großdeutschland and the Sturmpionier-Battalion 43 (43rd Assault Engineer Battalion), as the 1st Panzer only had a single rifle regiment. Großdeutschland would be attached to the 1st Panzer Division for the remainder of the campaign, and it was the first unit to breach the defences on Hill 247, the high ground dominating Gaulier. The regiment, much to its surprise, discovered the Luftwaffe had failed to destroy the enemy bunkers. Enemy small-arms fire ensured that crossing the river at Pont Neuf bridge could not be done in rubber assault boats as intended. The regiment retreated. Reconnaissance found an enemy bunker, No. 211, was still active. It guarded the bridgehead, making it dangerous for German infantry attempting a crossing. A platoon of infantry guns (75 mm short barrel artillery) failed to knock it out. An 8.8 cm FlaK dual purpose gun (88 mm) was brought in to do the job. It succeeded, but the following crossing failed, as machine-gun fire came from another flanking position that had not been spotted. Once this was dealt with by the 2nd Battalion, the remainder of the regiment crossed the river. Throughout the rest of the day, the regiment moved up and into the French defences, the 2nd Battalion's 6th, 7th and 8th Companies gradually knocking out each bunker. Despite the other two battalions being held up further south, by 20:00 the central Hill 247 had been taken. Großdeutschland had now penetrated 8 kilometres (5.0 mi) into the French defences.

On Hill 301, further west, the First Rifle Regiment, under Col. Hermann Balck, had helped take the position by nightfall. With support from two platoons of the 3rd Company of the 34th Assault Engineer Battalion, it knocked out the bunker positions. The regiment inched westward and was able to see the 2nd Panzer Division on the extreme western flank of the 1st Panzer, attacking the bunker position near Donchery. Several panzers were knocked out. The First Rifle Regiment, 1st Panzer, had crossed the boundary into the 2nd Panzer's territory. They eased the 2nd Panzer's passage by knocking out several bunkers on their eastern flank and succeeded in cutting the Donchery-Sedan road. The infantry also knocked out most of the casemates in the area using flamethrower teams to destroy the bunkers whose defenders did not surrender quickly. The last bunker to surrender did so at 22:40 hours on 13 May. By that time, elements of the 1st and 2nd Panzer Divisions had negotiated the Meuse river.

=== 2nd Panzer Division at Donchery ===
The 2nd Panzer had been given the most difficult job. Its advance through the Ardennes was delayed by nearly 250 kilometres (160 mi) of traffic. Consequently, it arrived late at Donchery, after the 1st and 10th Panzer Divisions had initiated their assaults across the Meuse. Due to a combination of its being late and the attacks of its sister units, the enemy defences were alerted in advance of the 2nd Panzer's offensive. Crossing at the extreme western end of the Sedan sector on the Donchery axis, it was forced to advance across open terrain for the last 3 kilometres (1.9 mi) before reaching the bridgehead. This subjected the division to fire from Donchery and the Bellevue Castle's 75mm artillery, located slightly to the east of the town. Several boats were tied to the panzers and dragged across, but the tanks were knocked out. The bulk of the 174 artillery pieces available to the French at Sedan were concentrated on the 2nd Panzer Division's front. Most were located in the bunkers on the south side of the river Meuse-Donchery sector. Some of the French 102nd Infantry Division's batteries also joined in from the north-west, at Charleville. The only way to respond was with howitzers but the 2nd Panzer Division had handed its heavy howitzers over to the 1st Panzer. Only 24 guns remained, and they did not arrive on the battlefield until 17:00. When they arrived, they had only had a couple of shells per gun owing to the logistical tailback in the Ardennes.

All attempts to land on the southern side of the Meuse failed. Fortunately for Guderian, the 1st Panzer Division succeeded in crossing the Meuse in the centre (see above). Once across, it headed into the right (eastern) flank of the French at Donchery. Some of its units cleared the Meuse bend. Assault engineers and the 1st Panzer Division neutralised the guns at Bellevue Castle and cleared the bunker positions along the Meuse from the rear. The artillery falling on the 2nd Panzer Division's eastern flank was stopped. With the threat of artillery fire on its right flank removed, the units on the 2nd Panzer's left flank crossed the river and infiltrated the French positions opposite Donchery at 20:00. Heavy French fire continued from the bunkers in front of Donchery on the south side of the Meuse. It was not until 22:20, in darkness, that regular ferrying missions enabled the reinforcement of the German bridgehead.

=== 10th Panzer at Wadelincourt ===
The 10th Panzer Division, like the 2nd Panzer Division, had detached its heavy artillery batteries to support neighbouring units. It was left with just 24 light 105 mm howitzers. Moreover, the batteries were short of ammunition. The Luftwaffe had not helped the 10th Panzer Division, as most of the air attacks were in support of the 1st Panzer Division in the central sector. This meant all of the French artillery and machine-gun positions in the area of Wadelincourt were undisturbed. Added to this, the newly inserted 71st Infantry Division and French X Corps in the Remilly-Aillicourt area prevented the 10th Panzer Division from making any quick progress. The division also had to advance to the river across some 600–800 metres (2,000–2,600 ft) of open flat terrain.

Near the town of Bazeilles, the engineers and assault infantry had gathered to prepare boats for the crossing of the Meuse at Wadelincourt, 2 kilometres (1.2 mi) south of Sedan, when a French artillery barrage destroyed 81 out of 96 rubber boats. The plan of attack had included an assault by both the 69th and 89th infantry regiments, but the loss of so many boats meant that only the 86th Infantry Regiment was able to conduct the crossing. The 69th Infantry Regiment was kept in reserve to follow the 86th as reinforcements.

The 10th Panzer Division's assaults failed all along the Meuse front. The only success came from a small 11-man team (five engineers and six infantrymen) of the 2nd Company, Panzerpionier-Batailion 49 (49th Panzer Engineer Battalion), under the 1st Battalion, 86th Infantry Regiment. Unsupported and acting on their own initiative, this small force led by Feldwebel Walter Rubarth opened a decisive breach by knocking out seven bunker positions. Follow-up units from the 1st Battalion, 86th Rifle Regiment, crossed over by 21:00 and stormed the remaining bunkers on Hill 246, where the main French defence positions were located. By the end of the day, the bridgehead had been consolidated and the objective taken.

=== Allied bombing ===
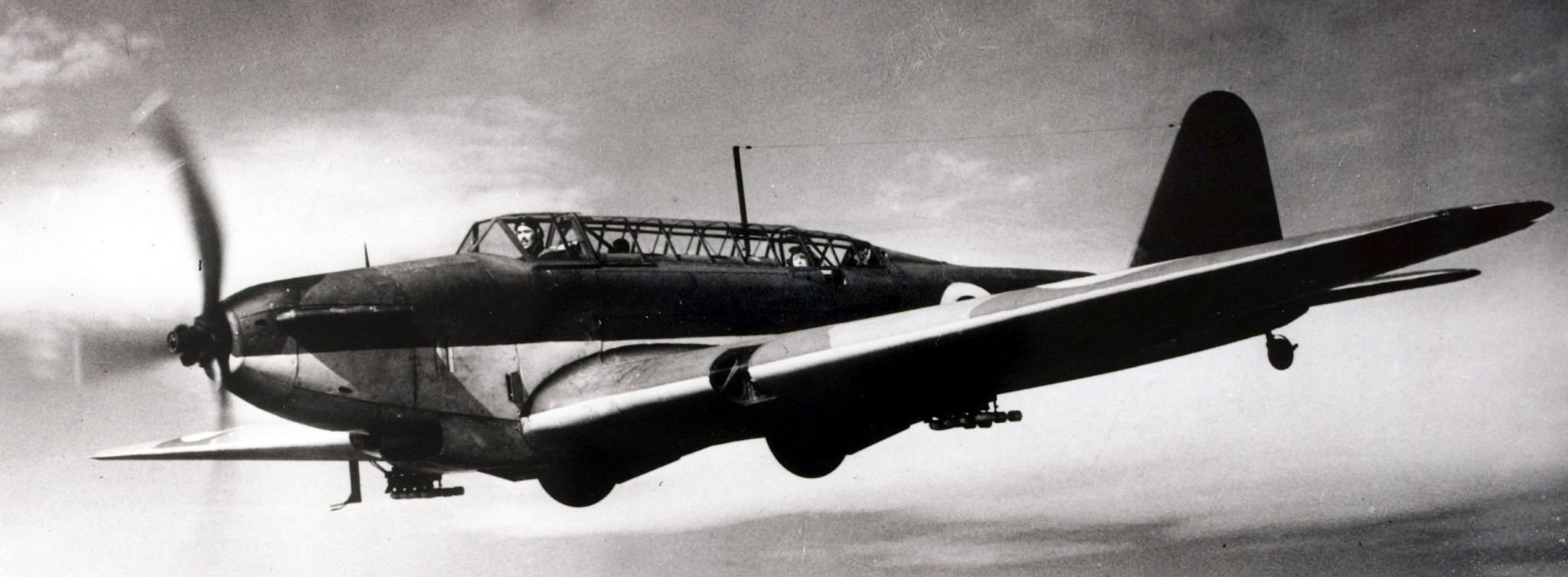
The obsolescent RAF Fairey Battle suffered heavy losses over the bridgehead.

In the central sector, at Gaulier, the Germans began moving 3.7 cm Pak 36 light infantry field artillery across the Meuse to provide support to infantry across the river. By 01:00 on 14 May, a pontoon bridge had been erected over which Sd.Kfz. 222, Sd.Kfz. 232 and Sd.Kfz. 264 armoured cars began to drive to the bridgeheads. French reports spoke of German tanks crossing the bridges. Such reports were in error, as the first panzers only crossed at 07:20 on 14 May. Prior to this, masses of lorries, armoured cars and other traffic had crossed, but not tanks.

The capture of Sedan and the expansion of the bridgeheads alarmed the French, who called for a total effort against the bridgeheads at Sedan, to isolate the three panzer divisions. General Gaston-Henri Billotte, commander of the First French Army Group, whose right flank pivoted on Sedan, urged that the bridges across the Meuse be destroyed by air attack, convinced that "over them will pass either victory or defeat!" General Marcel Têtu, commander of the Allied Tactical Air Forces ordered, "Concentrate everything on Sedan. Priority between Sedan and Houx is at 1,000,000 to 1".

No. 103 Squadron and No. 150 Squadron RAF of the RAF Advanced Air Striking Force (AASF) flew 10 sorties against the targets in the early morning, suffering only one loss in a forced landing. Between 15:00–16:00, 71 RAF bombers took off, escorted by Allied fighters. However, German fighters outnumbered the Allied escort fighters by 3:1. No. 71 Wing RAF lost 10 Fairey Battles and five Bristol Blenheims. No. 75 Wing RAF lost 14–18 Battles and No. 76 Wing RAF lost 11 Battles. Out of 71 bombers dispatched, 40–44 bombers were lost, a loss rate of 56–62 percent. The AASF also lost five Hawker Hurricanes. The AASF flew 81 sorties and lost 52 percent of its strength. No 2 Group RAF also contributed with 28 sorties. The bombing results were poor, with three bridges damaged and one possibly destroyed.

French Air Forces under the command of Commandant des Forces (Commander of Forces) Marcel Têtu Aeriennes de Cooperation du Front Nord-Est (Airborne Cooperation Front North East, or FACNE) rarely supported the British efforts, despite substantial reinforcements. They flew only an average of one sortie per day, including strategic defensive missions. One reason for this was the heavy French bomber losses on the previous two days. During the Battle of Maastricht in the Netherlands, the Groupement de Bombardement (Bomber Groups, or GB) had its squadrons reduced. GB I/12 and II/12 had only 13 LeO 451s between them. Groupement de Bombardement d'Assaut 18 (GBA 18) had only 12 of 25 Breguet 693s left. GB I/34 and II/34 could muster eight aircraft out of 22 Amiot 143s, I/38 seven out of 12, and II/38 six out of 11. All of these groups were sent to Sedan on 14 May. Protection was provided by Groupement de Chasse (Fighter Groups, or GC). GC III/7, with 12 Morane 406s, 12 Bloch 152s of I/8 and nine Dewoitine D.520s of I/3 took part. GBA 18 was escorted by 15 Bloch 152s of GC I/8. The missions cost the French five bombers, two from ground fire. After this, the French bomber forces were eliminated from the fight over Sedan. The major efforts were now made by the AASF.

The Allied bombers received mostly poor protection. Only 93 fighter sorties, 60 by the French, were flown. The French lost 21 fighters in the operation. The German air defence was soon reinforced by Jagdgeschwader 26 and Jagdgeschwader 27 (Fighter Wings 26 and 27). One of the premier German fighter units responsible for the heavy loss rate was Jagdgeschwader 53 (Fighter Wing 53), which later engaged French bombers who tried to succeed where the AASF failed. The attacks failed as they were uncoordinated. Along with fighter aircraft, the Germans had assembled powerful flak concentrations in Sedan. The flak battalions of the 1st, 2nd and 10th Panzer Divisions numbered 303 anti-aircraft guns. This force was built around the 102nd Flak Regiment with its 88 mm, 37 mm, and rapid fire 20 mm weapons. So heavy was the defensive fire that the Allied bombers could not concentrate over the target. Allied bomber pilots called it "hell along the Meuse". On 14 May, the Allies flew 250 sorties, the French losing 30 (another source states 21) and the RAF losing 20 fighter aircraft. Another 65 were heavily damaged. Out of 109 RAF bombers dispatched, 47 were shot down. This meant 167 aircraft had been lost against one target. Loerzer called 14 May "the day of the fighter".

The German generals, in particular Guderian, were relieved that the Luftwaffe had prevented the Allied bombers from knocking out their supply bridges. By nightfall, at least 600 tanks, including those of the 2nd Panzer Division, which had to use the 1st Panzer Division's bridge at Gaulier (owing to theirs not having yet been constructed), were across the Meuse. The German victory in the air battle had been decisive.

== French counter-offensive ==
Huntziger, commanding the Second Army, was unconcerned by the capture of Sedan or of the collapse of French defences in the face of air attack. He expected considerable French reserves, particularly X Corps, to stabilise the front. The forces at his disposal were formidable. Guderian's decision to strike westwards left the 10th Panzer Division protecting the bridgehead alone. Opposing this force was XXI Corps (3d Armoured Division, 3d Motorised Infantry Division, 5th Light Cavalry Division, 1st Cavalry Brigade) under Flavigny. A second group, consisting of the 2nd Light Cavalry Division and 3rd Tank Division reinforced Flavigny. X Corps, with the 12th and 64th Reconnaissance Battalions, elements of the 71st Infantry Division, 205th Infantry Regiment, the 4th Tank Battalion also joined the attack. The French had nearly 300 tanks, with 138 main battle tanks consisting of Hotchkiss H35s and Char B1-Bises.

The French tanks had heavier armour and armament than the panzers. The Panzer IV had 30 mm of armour, while the Hotchkiss had 45 mm, and the Char B1 had 60 mm of protection. Moreover, the Char B1's main armament, one 47 mm and one 75 mm gun, outmatched all the German tanks. In an open field engagement, Guderian's armour stood little chance. Two-thirds of his units were equipped with Panzer I and IIs. Just 30 of the Panzer IVs were on his order of battle. However, one crucial disadvantage of the French tanks, considered as a broad whole, was their low endurance. They needed refuelling after just two hours. They were also slow, complicating high-tempo operations.

=== Missed chance ===
During 14 May, General Lafontaine had moved the 55th Infantry Division's command post from its position on the Marfee heights to Bulson, 10–11 kilometres (6–7 mi) south of Sedan. The French had prepared, to an extent, for a German breakthrough at Sedan, and accordingly placed X Corps available for a counter-attack. It was to occupy the Bulson position on the Chéhéry–Bulson–Haraucourt axis and strike at the Meuse bridgeheads. The terrain included heavily wooded areas, and the units left behind convinced General Charles Huntziger, commander of the French Second Army, that they would be able to hold Bulson, and the Germans would not be able to exploit their tactical victory at Sedan on 14 May.

The Germans had a seven-hour delay in getting their armour across the bridge from 01:20-07:30, which could have been disastrous for the panzer divisions. The French had already initiated plans for counter-attacks with armour on the German-held bridgehead during the night, but delays in bringing up forces and hesitation on the part of local overall French command at large, made worse by mistaken intelligence reports and by the resulting confusion from the panic and retreat of the infantry who had also abandoned their positions and artillery as part of the "panic of Bulson", made an attack possible only in the morning of 14 May. The commander of X Corps' artillery, Colonel Poncelet, had tried to keep his units where they were, but had reluctantly ordered a retreat. This decision resulted in the corps' artillery battalions abandoning many heavy artillery pieces and caused the collapse of the 55th Infantry Division ("panic of Bulson") and a partial collapse of the 71st Infantry Division. Poncelet killed himself a few days later.

On 13–14 May, the Germans were vulnerable. A strong attack at this point by the French armoured units could have prevented Guderian from breaking out of the bridgeheads and changed the outcome of the campaign. However, the French commanders, deeply schooled and versed in the defensively focused doctrine of methodological warfare, were located far to the rear, which meant they lacked a real-time picture of the battle. The French forces in the area were also hindered by mistaken intelligence reports which suggested that German tanks had already crossed the Meuse river, several hours before the first German tank actually did so. When intelligence did filter through, it was outdated. This was to prove fatal, especially coupled with the fact that the French generalship at large was expecting a considerably more prolonged initial German assault phase and overall attack.

=== Race to Bulson ===
The race to Bulson ridge began at 16:00 on 13 May. At 07:30 on 14 May, French armour advanced to Bulson ridge, seeking to seize the high ground vacated by the 55th Infantry Division on 13 May and, more importantly, destroy the German bridgeheads. While that may have been possible on 13 May, the odds had shifted against the French.

The X Corps' attack involved a strike on the left flank by the 213th Infantry Regiment and 7th Tank Battalion, and on the right flank by the 205th Infantry Regiment and 4th Tank Battalion. The right flanking force arrived late, so the 213th Infantry and the 7th Tank Battalion advanced alone on the north axis. It was thought that the 213th could reach an area in between Chéhéry and Bulson in an hour and 50 minutes and the 7th Tank Battalion in two hours. Yet it was not until 17 hours after the original order to advance that the lead French tanks reached the Bulson ridge, only to find the Germans had beaten them there by a few minutes.

Lafontaine had hesitated over 24 hours since the afternoon of 13 May. He spent hours reconnoitring the terrain, sometimes trying to rally scores of fleeing French infantrymen and artillerymen of the 55th and 71st Infantry Divisions, and travelling around the area to various regimental headquarters, looking for his corps commander, General Gransard (who was deliberately reconnoitring the terrain for some time), for an order to attack, and, in the meantime, extemporarily assessing and conferring with some local command personnel. Owing to this, Lafontaine also delayed issuing orders to the tactical attack units until 05:00 on 14 May, by which time the Germans had consolidated their bridgehead and the panzer divisions' combined arms infantry teams were already advancing inland to Bulson. Lafontaine had had a mission plan since 20:00 on 13 May to defeat the Germans and retake the Meuse bridgeheads, but he waited for an order to proceed. Lafontaine's need for an order was contrary to the unit actions of the Germans, who operated the tactically more efficient Auftragstaktik (Mission Command) system. Ultimately, Lafontaine had squandered valuable hours essential for a potentially decisive counter-attack.

The French had an opportunity to throw the Germans back across the Meuse, but they missed their chance owing to poor staff work, compounded by confusion, hesitation, delays in bringing up forces, mistaken intelligence reports, and lack of quick response. The 1st Panzer Division had struggled to advance as quickly as it would have liked and was jammed on the roads leading out of Gaulier and Sedan. Moreover, the German soldiers were exhausted after a five-day advance. A quick counter-thrust by just two infantry regiments and two tank battalions would have "plunged the Germans into crisis". Even a failed attack and the holding of Bulson would have allowed it to be used by formations of the Second French Army and the tank units, including the French 3rd Armoured Division of General Jean Adolphe Louis Robert Flavigny's powerful French XXI Corps, which were moving up from the Maginot line area in the south.

Contributing to their problems, the French lacked mobile tanks and offensively intended tanks. French military doctrine dictated that the tanks, mostly FCM 36s intended as defensive-oriented infantry support units, were to advance with the infantry. The FCM 36 was not designed to go any faster for this reason, so its top speed was only 24 km/h (15 mph). It took from 07:30 to 08:45 on 14 May for the French armour to traverse the last 2 kilometres (1.2 mi) to the ridge. Lead elements of the 1st and 2nd Panzer Divisions had reached the ridge just minutes before, having crossed 9 kilometres (5.6 mi) in less time. But the initial clash was not in the Germans' favour. Instead of making sure the medium Panzer III and Panzer IV tanks had priority in crossing the Meuse, the Germans had sent few across, and the vanguard of the advance contained mostly lightly armed and lightly armoured, although faster, Panzer Is and IIs.

=== Battle of Bulson ===
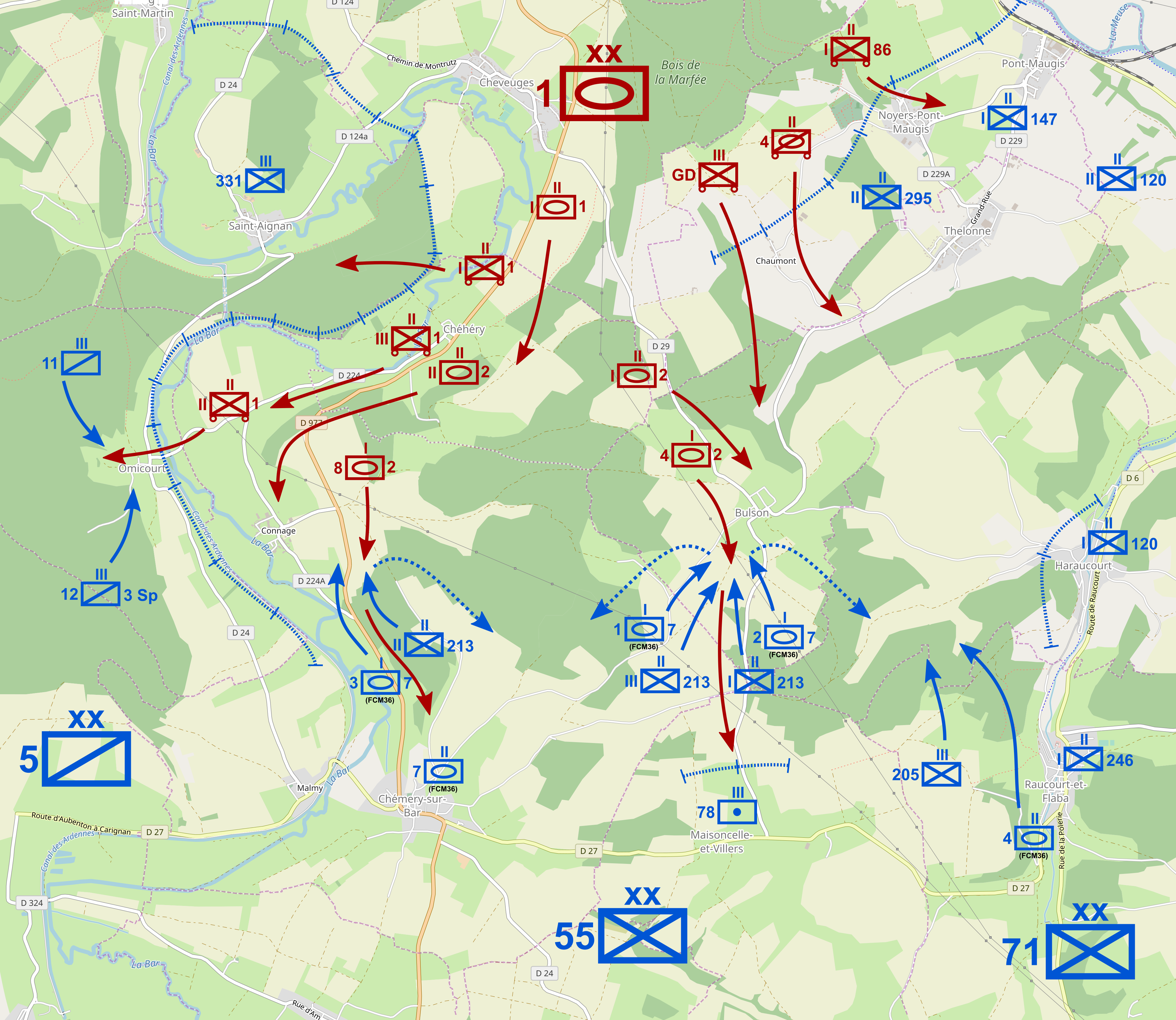
Map of the tank battles at Bulson and Connage, 14 May

The initial encounters took place as the Battle of Hannut was being fought in Belgium. The results were much the same. On the southern face of Bulson, Kirchner, commander of the 1st Panzer Division, suffered several tactical reverses and saw the 37 mm shells from his 3.7 cm PaK 36 anti-tank guns and Panzer IIIs bounce off the more heavily armoured French tanks. A number of German tanks were knocked out in rapid succession. The Germans had to hold the French at the ridge. Kirchner was forced to send in his tanks in dribs and drabs, tactics which Guderian hated, but which he himself decided there was no other recourse. It was once again the German tanks' radio equipment that enabled them to move around quickly and communicate with one another, to change the point of defence or attack quickly. The speed of the German tanks also enabled them to offset their inferiority in combat power to the French tanks. Often, Panzer IIIs and IVs could speed into the rear of French formations, closing quickly and knocking out the French armour from the rear. The Germans noted the particular weakness between the chassis and turret of the French tanks, which were vulnerable to their fire.

The French artillery concealed in wooded areas proved more potent than the tanks. Only a single German panzer unit had actually crossed the river Meuse: the 4th Company, 1st Battalion, 2nd Panzer Regiment. It advanced to Bulson and was wiped out by French artillery, pulling back with just one battleworthy tank. The company retreated under the cover of part of the ridge, and moved its single tank back and forth, simulating the presence of many German tanks. Diverted from their success at Gaulier, near Sedan, the 2nd Company was rushed to the spot and managed to delay the French armoured advance. Großdeutschland's late arrival tilted the scales. They managed to eliminate the anti-tank lines and entrenched French infantry.

On the left side of the Bulson ridge, the Germans encountered 13 French tanks with support from infantry near Chéhéry. The Germans' advance intended to strike at Connage to the south of the town of Chéhéry, to outflank the French. Kirchner reacted quickly, ordering two anti-tank platoons to set up at Connage. The 37 mm guns struggled to halt the French armour, which then outflanked the position at Connage by moving to the west while the infantry advanced from the south-east on the German right flank. The 43rd Assault Engineer Battalion and the 8th Company, 2nd Battalion, 2nd Panzer Regiment, arrived and pushed the French back to the town of Chémery-sur-Bar, some 5 kilometres (3.1 mi) south-west of Bulson, and due south of Connage.

At 10:45, Lafontaine ordered a retreat, and Guderian finally got heavy artillery from Großdeutschland. The 88 mm dual-role artillery guns and the heavier Panzer III and IVs arrived. By this time, the French 7th Tank Battalion had been wiped out and the 213th Infantry Regiment had been devastated. Only 10 French tanks, out of 40, remained. In the two pitched battles the 7th Tank Battalion fought that day, they lost 10 of 13. Delays on the right flank meant the 205th Infantry Regiment and 4th Tank Battalion did not reach their starting line until 10:45, by which time the battle on the left wing had been lost and further attacks on the right would have made little sense. The 1st Panzer Division's victory parade was held in Chemery at 12:00, but it was cut short when the Luftwaffe bombed the square by mistake, inflicting a few casualties.

=== Battle of Stonne ===
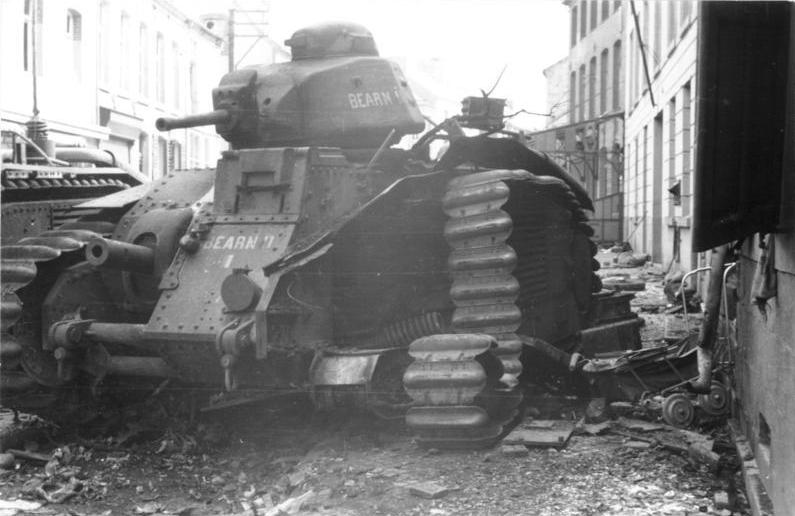
Destroyed French B1 bis.

The German High Command did not want to exploit the victory at Sedan and Bulson until their infantry divisions had caught up with the three panzer divisions. To Guderian, this was madness and would throw away the victory at Sedan and allow the enemy time to recover and reorganise its still formidable armoured units. Guderian decided to push for the Channel, even if it meant ignoring the High Command and Hitler himself. He ordered the 10th Panzer Division and the Infantry Regiment Großdeutschland to hold the Sedan bridgehead, while the 1st and 2nd Panzer Divisions struck north-west towards the Channel. Now that they were pushing largely at an 'open door', the 1st and 2nd quickly advanced into the undefended French rear.

The Sedan bridgeheads were not securely under German control, though, and French forces were massing to the south. Guderian decided it would be better to mount an aggressive defence, given the lack of any suitable anti-tank weapons for a defensive battle. It was better attack rather than defend. The advance of the 1st and 2nd Panzer Divisions assisted his progress. They ran into and defeated elements of X Corps near Chémery-sur-Bar. The French corps was heading towards Sedan, but withdrew southward after the engagement. Any potential threat on the German western flank had been removed.

Part of Guderian's original plan had called for a feint south towards and behind the Maginot Line to mask the thrust to the Channel. General Franz Halder had dropped this from Fall Gelb, but Guderian resurrected it and ordered the 10th Panzer Division and the Infantry Regiment Großdeutschland to attack across the Stonne plateau. In this innocuous town, a vicious two-day battle took place in which the Germans came face-to-face with the premier French tank, the Char B1-Bis, for the only time. One of these tanks, commanded by Pierre Billotte, proved invulnerable to German anti-tank fire and took 140 hits, and knocked out 13 German tanks (two Panzer IVs and 11 Panzer IIIs) and a number of anti-tank guns. The French had concentrated their own armour there to mount another attack on the Sedan bridgeheads. The Battle of Stonne took place between 15 and 17 May, and the town changed hands 17 times. Ultimately the failure of the French to hold it meant the final failure to eliminate the Sedan bridgeheads.

The French offensive at Stonne was of vital importance. The town remained a base on high ground overlooking Sedan. The French could use it as a base from which to launch long-term attacks on Sedan. On 13 May, the battle began. The French committed the 3d Company, 49th Tank Battalion; the 1st Company, 45th Tank Battalion; the 2nd Company, 4th Tank Battalion; the 1st Battalion, 67th Infantry Regiment; and the 1st Company, 51st Infantry Regiment. The French infantry were slow in their advance, which meant the armour outran them. Alone, the tanks tried to attack and failed. At this time, Stonne was held only by the 1st Battalion, Großdeutschland, supported by only nine of the regiment's 12 anti-tank artillery guns. As the French pressed forward, the weak German defence struggled to hold its ground. However, when one German platoon managed to knock out three French Char B1s, the French tank crews panicked and drove away to the south. It was a psychological victory for the Germans which encouraged their continued defence of the position. In the next attacks, they held their positions. The town would fall repeatedly to each side over the next 48 hours, as offensive followed counter-attack. The 10th Panzer sent its 1st Battalion, 69th Infantry Regiment, to support the hard-pressed Großdeutschland. The Germans retook the town at 17:00 on 17 May, for the fourth time in nine hours.

The Germans reinforced their defences on the night of 16 May with VI Corps, consisting of the 16th (under Heinrich Krampf) and 24th Infantry Divisions. It was a timely deployment. By this time Großdeutschland had lost 570 men and was in need of rest, and the Panzerjägerkompanie 14 (14th Panzer Anti-tank Company) had lost six of its 12 guns. It had also lost 12 dead and 65 wounded. Stonne was destroyed. Around 33 French tanks and 24 German panzers had been knocked out. With IV Corps now supporting the German defence and counter-attacks, the town was captured for the 17th and final time at 17:45 on 17 May.

Maps of the engagements at Stonne, 15–16 May
Map showing the initial German attack on Stonne on 15 May

Map showing the failed French counterattack on 15 May

Map showing the French attacks on 16 May, also showing "Eure"'s path

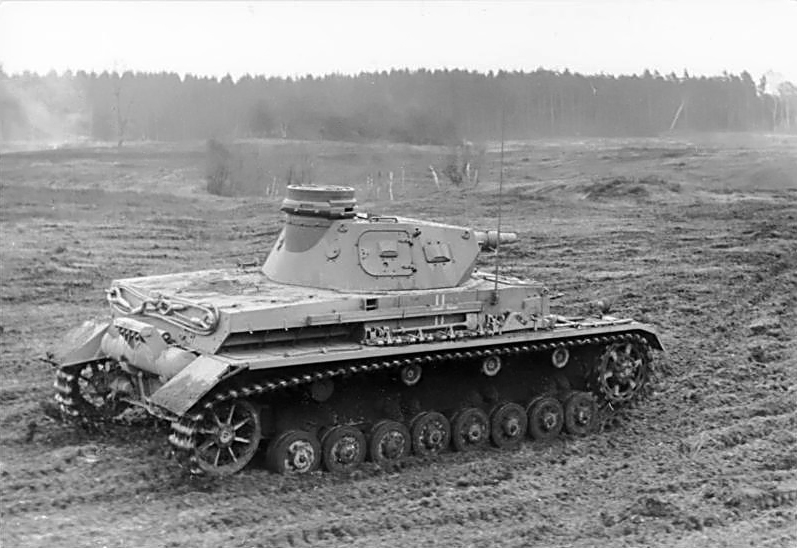
A German Panzer IV Ausf. D, c. 1940.

Change of Hands	Date	Time	Outcome
First	15 May	08:00	German victory
Second	15 May	09:00	French victory
Third	15 May	09:30	German victory
Fourth	15 May	10:30	French victory
Fifth	15 May	10:45	German victory
Sixth	15 May	12:00	French victory
Seventh	15 May	17:30	German victory
Eighth	16 May	07:30	French victory
Ninth	16 May	17:00	German victory
Tenth	night of 16–17 May	Unoccupied	-
Eleventh	17 May	09:00	German victory
Twelfth	17 May	11:00	French victory
Thirteenth	17 May	14:30	German victory
Fourteenth	17 May	15:00	French victory
Fifteenth	17 May	16:30	German victory
Sixteenth	17 May	17:00	French victory
Seventeenth	17 May	17:45	German victory

== Aftermath ==
The French defeat at Sedan left the Allies in Belgium with sparse flank protection, which was swiftly and handily defeated by the German forces in their driving thrust from their breakout at Sedan. The breakout was so fast that there was little fighting. Many French soldiers were taken prisoner before they could offer resistance, which also explains the low number of casualties suffered by both sides. The two assault engineer battalions under Günther Korthals achieved the most important success. By eliminating the bunkers in the Bellevue sector, they made the breakthroughs of the 1st and 2nd Panzer Divisions possible, and this was achieved without loss. Military historians agree that the Battle at Sedan sealed the fate of Belgium and France. On 14 May, the Allied forces had been caught wrong-footed, and through their failures in deployment they lost the campaign.

The German advance to the Channel trapped 1,700,000 Allied soldiers and resulted in the expulsion of the Allies from the mainland of Western Europe. The bulk of the British Army escaped from the port of Dunkirk, but the Allies left behind large amounts of equipment. The German encirclement destroyed the best units of the French Army, resulting in 40,000 soldiers being taken prisoner of war, but 139,732 British and 139,037 French troops escaped. French and British forces were dispatched from England and participated in the battles of June 1940, but the French armed forces ceased fighting on 25 June 1940, when the Armistice of 22 June took effect.

== See also ==
- List of French military equipment of World War II
- List of aircraft of the United Kingdom in World War II
- List of German military equipment of World War II
