= Chémery =

- Commune
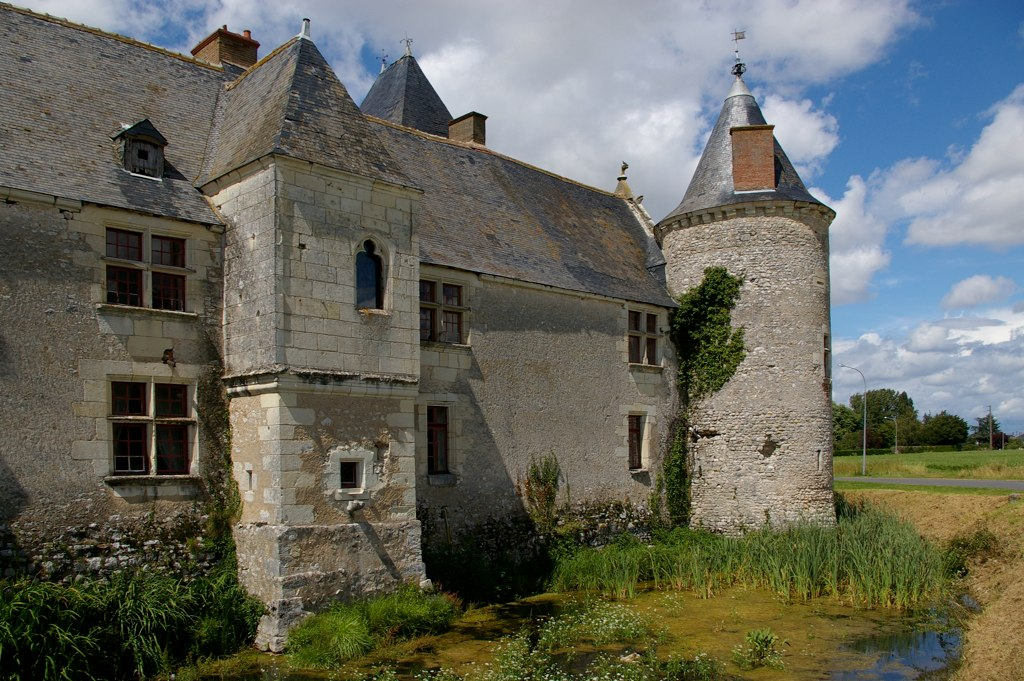
- Chateau

- Coat of arms
- Location of Chémery
- Location within France Location within Centre-Val de Loire
- Coordinates: 47°20′45″N 1°28′44″E
- Country: France
- Region: Centre-Val de Loire
- Department: Loir-et-Cher
- Arrondissement: Romorantin-Lanthenay
- Canton: Saint-Aignan
- Intercommunality: Val-de-Cher-Controis

Government
  - Mayor (2020–2026): Anne-Marie Thevenet
- Area^{1}: 34.16 km^{2} (13.19 sq mi)
- Elevation: 90 m (300 ft)
- Highest elevation: 136 m (446 ft)
- Lowest elevation: 84 m (276 ft)
- Population (2023): 925
  - Density: 27.1/km^{2} (70.1/sq mi)
- Time zone: UTC+01:00 (CET)
  - Summer (DST): UTC+02:00 (CEST)
- INSEE/Postal code: 41049 /41700
- ^{1} French Land Register data, which excludes lakes, ponds, glaciers > 1 km^{2} (0.386 sq mi or 247 acres) and river estuaries.

Chémery (French pronunciation: [ʃemʁi]) is a commune in the French department of Loir-et-Cher, Centre-Val de Loire, mainland France.

== Population ==
Historical population
Year	Pop.	±% p.a.
1968	1,047	—
1975	1,011	−0.50%
1982	921	−1.32%
1990	875	−0.64%
1999	849	−0.33%
2007	908	+0.84%
2012	974	+1.41%
2017	971	−0.06%
2023	925	−0.81%
Source: INSEE

== See also ==
- Chémery-Chéhéry, Ardennes, France, part of which is Chémery-sur-Bar
- Chémery-les-Deux, Moselle, France
- Chémery-lès-Faulquemont, Moselle, France
- Communes of the Loir-et-Cher department
