= Herbulot =

Herbulot (English: /ɛərbuːˈloʊ/, French: [ɛʁbylo]) is a French-language surname. Notable people with this surname include:

- Claude Herbulot (1908–2006), French entomologist
- Guy Herbulot (1925–2021), French Roman Catholic prelate
- Jean-Jacques Herbulot (1909–1997), French sailor
- Jean Luc Herbulot (born 1983), Congolese film director and screenwriter
