= Jean Adolphe Louis Robert Flavigny =

Jean Adolphe Louis Robert Flavigny (1880–1948) was a French general.

In May 1940, during the Battle of France, Wehrmacht troops crossed the Meuse near Sedan.

Flavigny hesitated to command the beginning of a counterattack during the Battle of Sedan and the French troops lost the battle.

He was taken prisoner on 23 June 23, 1940 and detained at the Königstein Fortress. On 19 January 1945, he was transferred to Colditz, where he remained until May 1945.
