= Guy Herbulot =

French priest and theologian (1925–2021)

Guy Alexis Herbulot
- Bishop of Évry-Corbeil-Essonnes
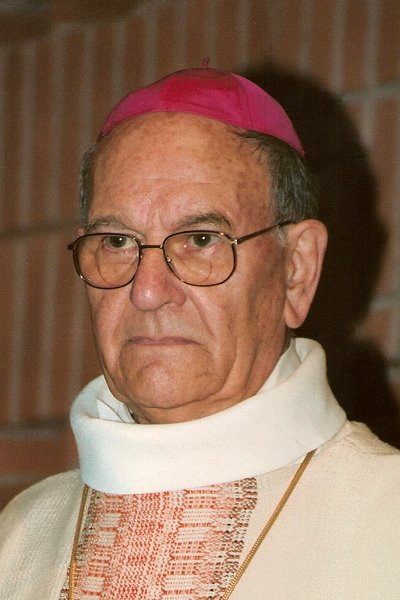
- Church: Catholic Church
- Diocese: Diocese of Évry-Corbeil-Essonnes
- In office: 12 May 1978 – 15 April 2000
- Predecessor: Albert Malbois
- Successor: Michel Dubost
- Previous posts: Titular Bishop of Obbi (1974-1978); Auxiliary Bishop of Reims (1974-1978)

Orders
- Ordination: 29 June 1950
- Consecration: 8 September 1974 by Jacques Eugène Louis Ménager

Personal details
- Born: 7 March 1925 Saint-Menges, Ardennes, France
- Died: 1 August 2021 (aged 96) Athis-Mons, Paris, France

Guy Alexis Herbulot (pronounced [ɡi alɛksi ɛʁbylo]; 7 March 1925 – 1 August 2021) was a French Roman Catholic prelate. He was ordained a priest in 1950. Herbulot served as the bishop of Évry-Corbeil-Essonnes from 1978 until 2000.

== Career ==
Herbulot was ordained priest on 29 June 1950 for the Diocese of Reims. In 1972, he was appointed Vicar General of Reims.

Herbulot was appointed auxiliary bishop of the diocese of Reims in residence at Charleville-Mézières on 20 June 1974. On 12 May 1978, he was appointed bishop of Corbeil-Essonnes. He retired on 15 April 2000.

== Personal life ==
Herbulot was born in Saint-Menges, France. He completed all of his training for the priesthood at the Grand Séminaire de Reims.

Herbulot died on 1 August 2021, aged 96.

== Honors ==
- Knight of the National Order of the Legion of Honor
