= Illy, Ardennes =

Illy
- Commune
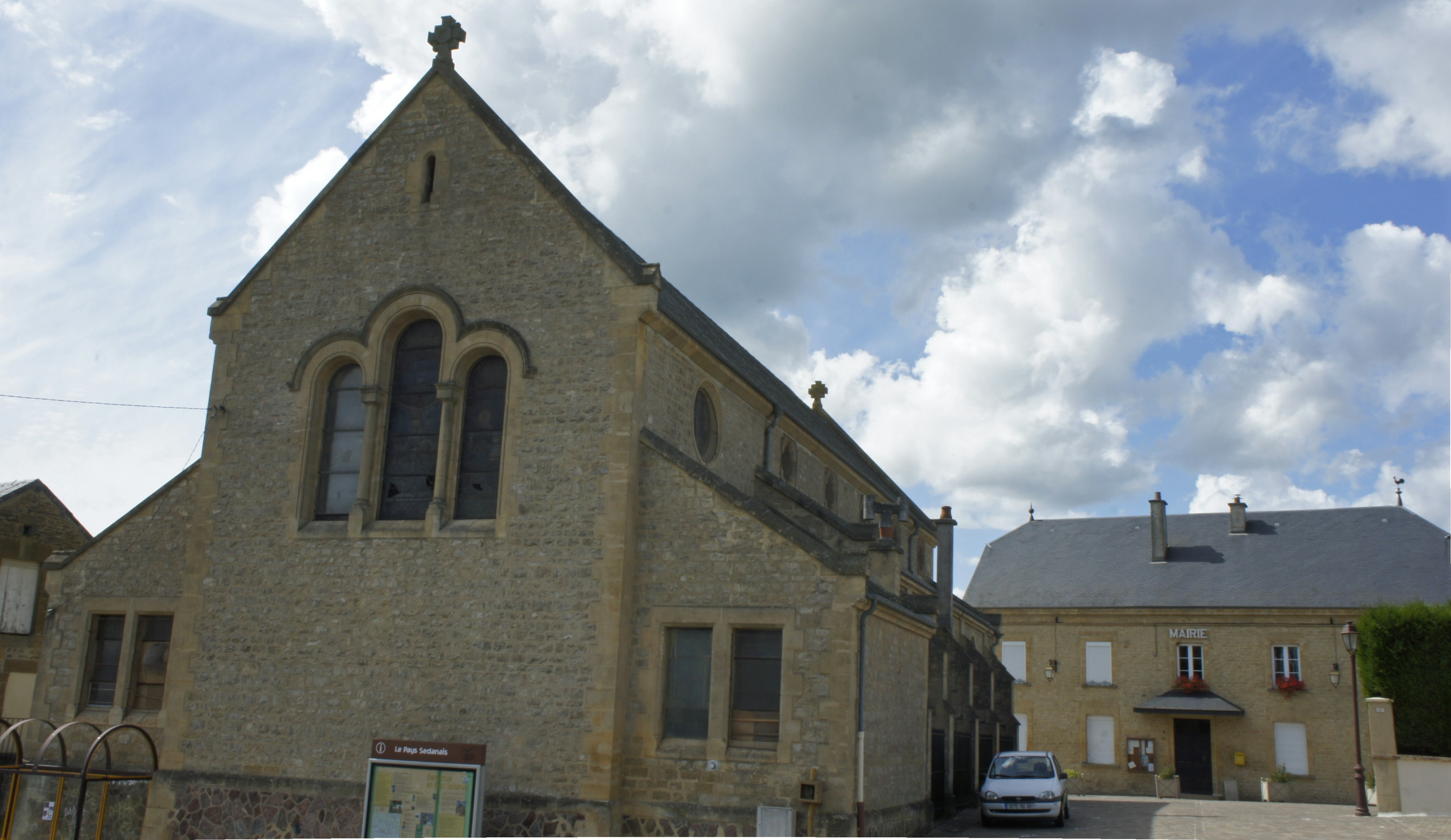
- Church and town hall

- Coat of arms
- Location of Illy
- Location within France Location within Grand Est
- Coordinates: 49°44′12″N 4°57′44″E
- Country: France
- Region: Grand Est
- Department: Ardennes
- Arrondissement: Sedan
- Canton: Sedan-2
- Intercommunality: Ardenne Métropole

Government
  - Mayor (2020–2026): Jacques Muller
- Area^{1}: 15.6 km^{2} (6.0 sq mi)
- Elevation: 240 m (790 ft)
- Population (2023): 413
  - Density: 26.5/km^{2} (68.6/sq mi)
- Time zone: UTC+01:00 (CET)
  - Summer (DST): UTC+02:00 (CEST)
- INSEE/Postal code: 08232 /08200
- ^{1} French Land Register data, which excludes lakes, ponds, glaciers > 1 km^{2} (0.386 sq mi or 247 acres) and river estuaries.

Illy is a commune in the Ardennes department in northern France.

== Population ==
Historical population
Year	Pop.	±% p.a.
1968	394	—
1975	395	+0.04%
1982	342	−2.04%
1990	413	+2.39%
1999	422	+0.24%
2007	407	−0.45%
2012	396	−0.55%
2017	411	+0.75%
2023	413	+0.08%
Source: INSEE

== See also ==
- Communes of the Ardennes department
