= Givonne =

- Commune
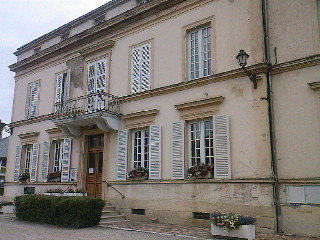
- Town hall

- Coat of arms
- Location of Givonne
- Location within France Location within Grand Est
- Coordinates: 49°43′16″N 4°59′20″E
- Country: France
- Region: Grand Est
- Department: Ardennes
- Arrondissement: Sedan
- Canton: Sedan-2
- Intercommunality: CA Ardenne Métropole

Government
  - Mayor (2020–2026): Raymonde Mahut
- Area^{1}: 14.04 km^{2} (5.42 sq mi)
- Elevation: 196 m (643 ft)
- Population (2023): 1,055
  - Density: 75.14/km^{2} (194.6/sq mi)
- Time zone: UTC+01:00 (CET)
  - Summer (DST): UTC+02:00 (CEST)
- INSEE/Postal code: 08191 /08200
- ^{1} French Land Register data, which excludes lakes, ponds, glaciers > 1 km^{2} (0.386 sq mi or 247 acres) and river estuaries.

Givonne (French pronunciation: [ʒivɔn]) is a commune in the Ardennes department in northern France.

== Population ==
Historical population
Year	Pop.	±% p.a.
1968	748	—
1975	924	+3.06%
1982	1,004	+1.19%
1990	926	−1.01%
1999	992	+0.77%
2007	1,125	+1.59%
2012	1,120	−0.09%
2017	1,043	−1.41%
2023	1,055	+0.19%
Source: INSEE

== See also ==
- Communes of the Ardennes department
