= 9th Army (France) =

The Ninth Army (French: IXe Armée) was a field army of the French Army during World War I and World War II.

The Ninth Army, first named "détachement d'armée Foch", was formed for the first time on 29 August 1914, to fill the gap between the Fourth and Fifth Army. It played an important role in the first Battle of the Marne. The Ninth Army was disbanded on 5 October 1914, when Foch became commander of Army Group North.

The Ninth Army was recreated on 6 July 1918 under command of Antoine de Mitry to fight in the Second Battle of the Marne.

In 1940, it was initially the only part of the French army that faced the Germans directly as they came unexpectedly through the Ardennes during the early stages of the Fall of France. It included the 41st Army Corps, of two fortress divisions.

== Commanders ==
=== World War I ===
- General Ferdinand Foch (29 August 1914 – 5 October 1914)
- General Antoine de Mitry (6 July 1918 – 7 August 1918)

=== World War II ===
- General André Corap (2 September 1939 – 19 May 1940)
- General Henri Giraud (19 May 1940)

== Racial Makeup and Discrimination ==
For much of WWII, the division was made up, in part, of soldiers from French colonies in Africa and the West Indies—including Frantz Fanon. However, in October of 1944, the High Command initiated what they referred to as a blanchiment (whitening) of the ninth division, relocating the African soldiers to other areas. They typically moved them to areas with more temperate climate, giving the reasoning that cold temperatures were unfamiliar to them. Some soldiers criticized them for this decision, believing they did it to reserve the honor of crossing the Rhine into Germany for white Frenchmen.

== See also ==
- List of French armies in WWI
