= La Chapelle, Ardennes =

La Chapelle
- Commune
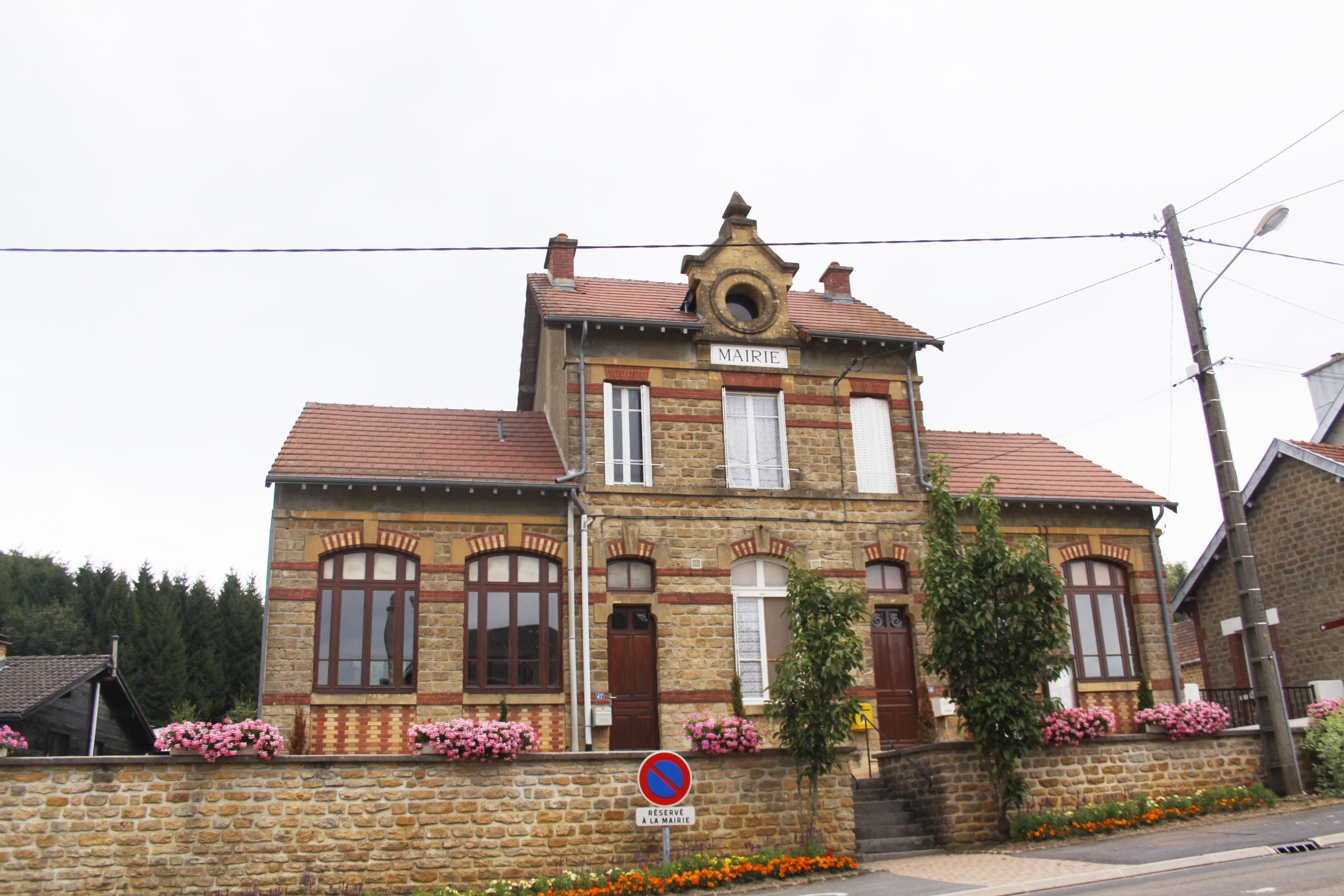
- The town hall

- Coat of arms
- Location of La Chapelle
- Location within France Location within Grand Est
- Coordinates: 49°44′32″N 5°00′56″E
- Country: France
- Region: Grand Est
- Department: Ardennes
- Arrondissement: Sedan
- Canton: Sedan-2
- Intercommunality: CA Ardenne Métropole

Government
  - Mayor (2020–2026): Jean-Paul Colinet
- Area^{1}: 7.52 km^{2} (2.90 sq mi)
- Elevation: 328 m (1,076 ft)
- Population (2023): 155
  - Density: 20.6/km^{2} (53.4/sq mi)
- Time zone: UTC+01:00 (CET)
  - Summer (DST): UTC+02:00 (CEST)
- INSEE/Postal code: 08101 /08200
- ^{1} French Land Register data, which excludes lakes, ponds, glaciers > 1 km^{2} (0.386 sq mi or 247 acres) and river estuaries.

La Chapelle (French pronunciation: [la ʃapɛl]; lit. 'The Chapel') is a commune in the Ardennes department in northern France, on the Belgian border.

== Geography ==
In 2010, the climate of the commune was a Type 1, according to a study by the French National Centre for Scientific Research based on a series of data covering the period of 1971–2000. In 2020, Météo France published a typology of the climates of metropolitan France in which the commune is exposed to an altered oceanic climate and is in the Lorraine, Langres plateau, Morvan climatic region, characterized by a harsh winter (1.5 °C), moderate winds and frequent fog in autumn and winter.

From 1971–2000, the mean annual temperature is 8.9 °C, with an annual temperature range of 15.2 °C. The average annual rainfall total is 1,090 mm, with 14.3 days of precipitation in January and 10.3 days in July. From 1991–2020, the average annual temperature observed at the nearest Météo-France weather station, "Douzy", in the commune of Douzy, 8 km away per great-circle navigation, is 10.5 °C and the mean annual precipitation total is 857.0 mm. The maximum temperature recorded at this station is 40.3 °C, reached on July 25, 2019; the minimum temperature was −14.8 °C, reached on January 3, 2004. (Note: The records are set for the period between May 1, 2002, and October 2, 2025.)

The municipality's climate parameters have been estimated for the middle of the century (2041–2070) according to different greenhouse gas emission scenarios based on the new DRIAS-2020 reference climate projections. They can be consulted on a dedicated website published by Météo-France in November 2022.

== Population ==
Historical population
Year	Pop.	±% p.a.
1968	124	—
1975	99	−3.17%
1982	116	+2.29%
1990	145	+2.83%
1999	156	+0.82%
2007	164	+0.63%
2012	166	+0.24%
2017	178	+1.41%
2023	155	−2.28%
Source: INSEE

== See also ==
- Communes of the Ardennes department
