= Glaire =

- Commune
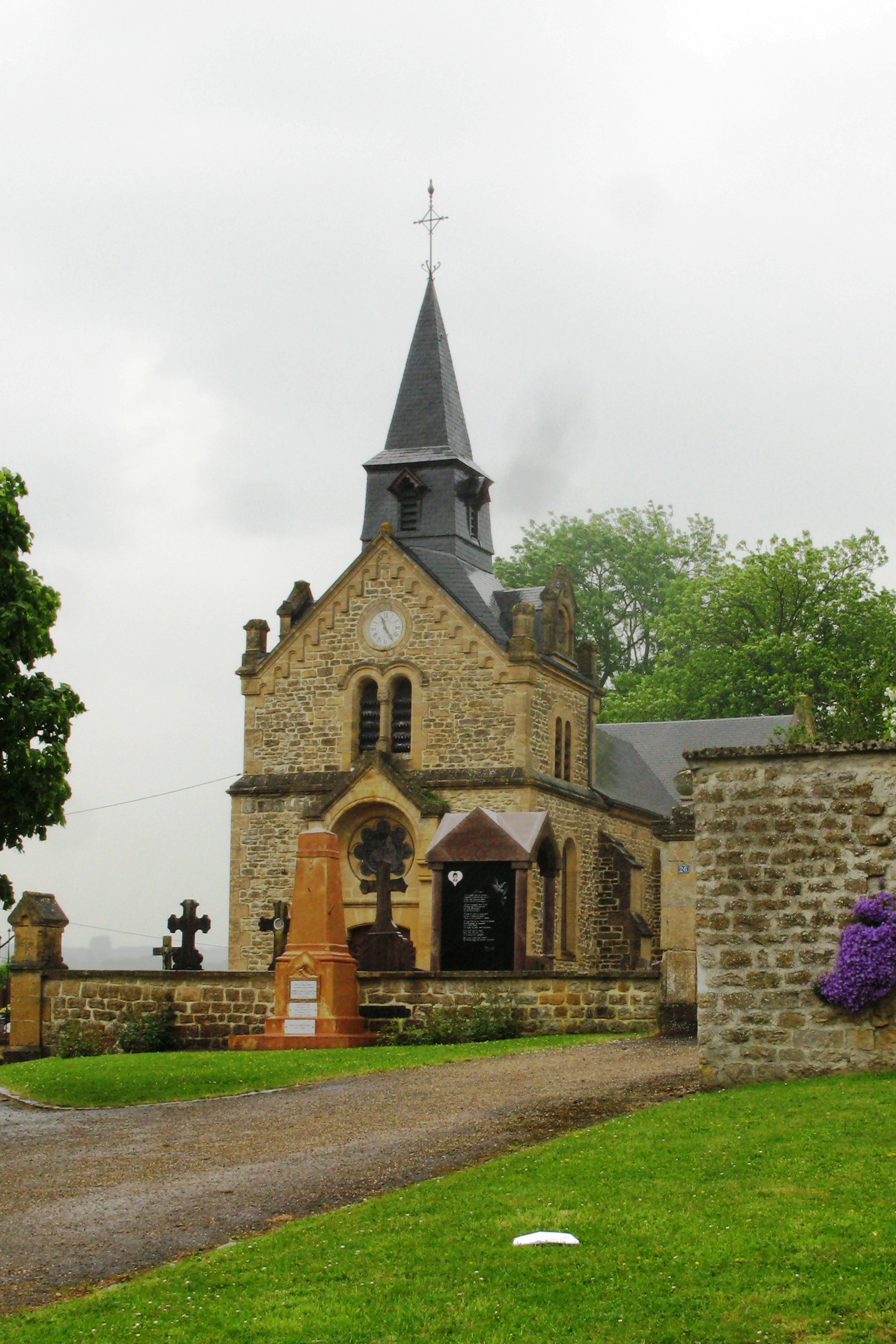
- Iges church

- Coat of arms
- Location of Glaire
- Location within France Location within Grand Est
- Coordinates: 49°42′42″N 4°54′56″E
- Country: France
- Region: Grand Est
- Department: Ardennes
- Arrondissement: Sedan
- Canton: Sedan-2
- Intercommunality: CA Ardenne Métropole

Government
  - Mayor (2020–2026): André Godin
- Area^{1}: 6.46 km^{2} (2.49 sq mi)
- Elevation: 157 m (515 ft)
- Population (2023): 846
  - Density: 131/km^{2} (339/sq mi)
- Time zone: UTC+01:00 (CET)
  - Summer (DST): UTC+02:00 (CEST)
- INSEE/Postal code: 08194 /08200
- ^{1} French Land Register data, which excludes lakes, ponds, glaciers > 1 km^{2} (0.386 sq mi or 247 acres) and river estuaries.

Glaire (French pronunciation: [ɡlɛʁ]) is a commune in the Ardennes department in northern France.

== Population ==
Historical population
Year	Pop.	±% p.a.
1968	688	—
1975	656	−0.68%
1982	943	+5.32%
1990	993	+0.65%
1999	935	−0.67%
2007	909	−0.35%
2012	921	+0.26%
2017	884	−0.82%
2023	846	−0.73%
Source: INSEE

== See also ==
- Communes of the Ardennes department
