= André Corap =

Former French Army General

André Georges Corap
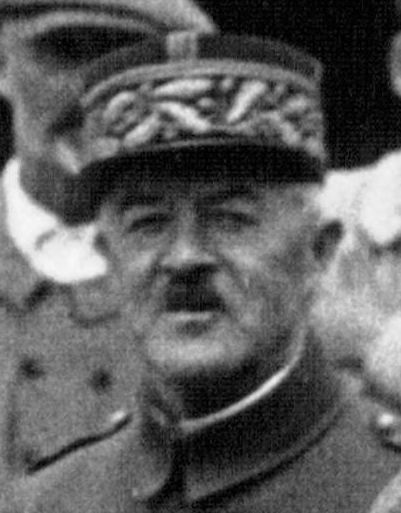
- Born: 15 January 1878; Pont Audemer, Normandy
- Died: 15 August 1953 (aged 75)
- Allegiance: France
- Branch: French Army
- Service years: 1898–1940
- Rank: Lieutenant General
- Commands: Ninth Army (France)
- Conflicts: World War I World War II; Battle of France
- Awards: Commander of the Légion d'honneur

André Georges Corap (French pronunciation: [ɑ̃dʁe ʒɔʁʒ kɔʁap]; 15 January 1878 – 15 August 1953) was a General in the French Army who fought in World War II. He commanded the 9th Army during the battle of France in 1940.

== Early life ==
Corap was born in Pont Audemer, Normandy. His father was a tailor.

== Military career ==
In 1898 he graduated from École spéciale militaire de Saint-Cyr and joined the French Army. He commanded colonial troops in Algeria and Morocco. In 1905, he was admitted to the Collège interarmées de défense.

=== First World War ===
In 1914, he was a captain in the Zouaves. He spent most of the war working as a staff officer for Generals Foch and Petain.

=== Interwar ===
He fought in the Rif War, capturing the leader of the insurgents, Abd el-Krim.

Corap was promoted to Brigadier General in 1929 and Major General in 1933. He was promoted to Lieutenant General in 1935 and given command of 2nd Military Division in 1937.

=== World War II ===
In 1939, at the outbreak of war, he was given command of the 9th Army. The 9th Army was deployed to cover the Ardennes during the German Blitzkrieg in 1940, and Corap was held responsible for the German breakthrough by the French high command. He was relieved from command on 19 May 1940, and retired into the reserves on 1 July 1940, a week after the surrender of France on 25 June.

== Sources ==
- who's who in 20th century warfare
- page from generals.dk
- page from the unofficial website of Ecole supérieure de guerre
