= Saint-Menges =

- Commune
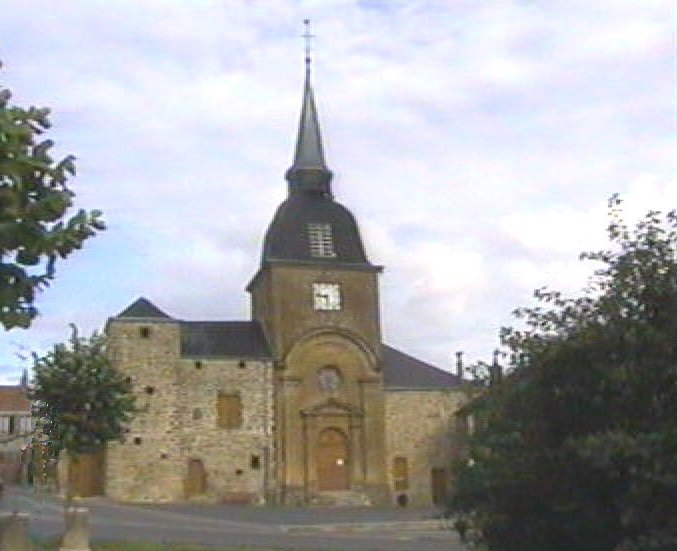
- The church in Saint-Menges

- Coat of arms
- Location of Saint-Menges
- Location within France Location within Grand Est
- Coordinates: 49°44′24″N 4°55′30″E
- Country: France
- Region: Grand Est
- Department: Ardennes
- Arrondissement: Sedan
- Canton: Sedan-2
- Intercommunality: CA Ardenne Métropole

Government
  - Mayor (2020–2026): Roger Watelet
- Area^{1}: 12.21 km^{2} (4.71 sq mi)
- Highest elevation: 420 m (1,380 ft)
- Lowest elevation: 147 m (482 ft)
- Population (2023): 922
  - Density: 75.5/km^{2} (196/sq mi)
- Time zone: UTC+01:00 (CET)
  - Summer (DST): UTC+02:00 (CEST)
- INSEE/Postal code: 08391 /08200
- ^{1} French Land Register data, which excludes lakes, ponds, glaciers > 1 km^{2} (0.386 sq mi or 247 acres) and river estuaries.

Saint-Menges (German pronunciation: [sɛ̃ mɑ̃ʒ]) is a commune in the Ardennes department in northern France.

It lies northwest of Sedan, near the border with Belgium.

== Population ==
Historical population
Year	Pop.	±% p.a.
1968	1,133	—
1975	1,058	−0.97%
1982	976	−1.15%
1990	964	−0.15%
1999	996	+0.36%
2007	1,037	+0.51%
2012	1,039	+0.04%
2017	972	−1.32%
2023	922	−0.88%
Source: INSEE

== See also ==
- Communes of the Ardennes department
