= Chémery-Chéhéry =

- Commune
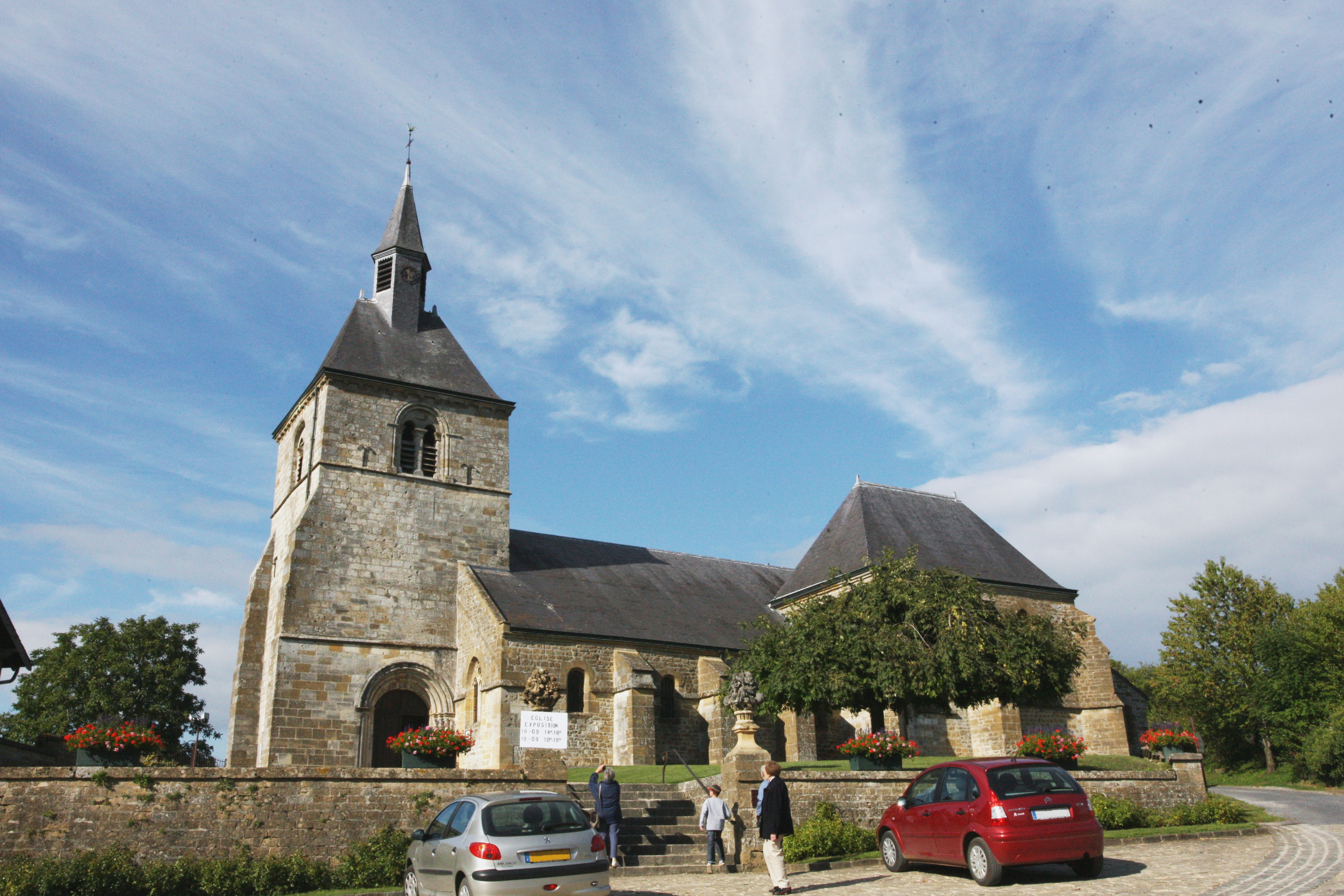
- The church in Chémery-sur-Bar
- Location of Chémery-Chéhéry
- Location within France Location within Grand Est
- Coordinates: 49°36′04″N 4°52′05″E
- Country: France
- Region: Grand Est
- Department: Ardennes
- Arrondissement: Sedan
- Canton: Vouziers

Government
  - Mayor (2020–2026): Bernard Riclot
- Area^{1}: 27.79 km^{2} (10.73 sq mi)
- Population (2023): 514
  - Density: 18.5/km^{2} (47.9/sq mi)
- Time zone: UTC+01:00 (CET)
  - Summer (DST): UTC+02:00 (CEST)
- INSEE/Postal code: 08115 /08450
- ^{1} French Land Register data, which excludes lakes, ponds, glaciers > 1 km^{2} (0.386 sq mi or 247 acres) and river estuaries.

Chémery-Chéhéry (French pronunciation: [ʃemʁi ʃe.eʁi]) is a commune in the Ardennes department of northern France. The municipality was established on 1 January 2016 and consists of the former communes of Chémery-sur-Bar and Chéhéry.

== See also ==
- Communes of the Ardennes department
