= Chéhéry =

Commune in Ardennes, France

- Part of Chémery-Chéhéry
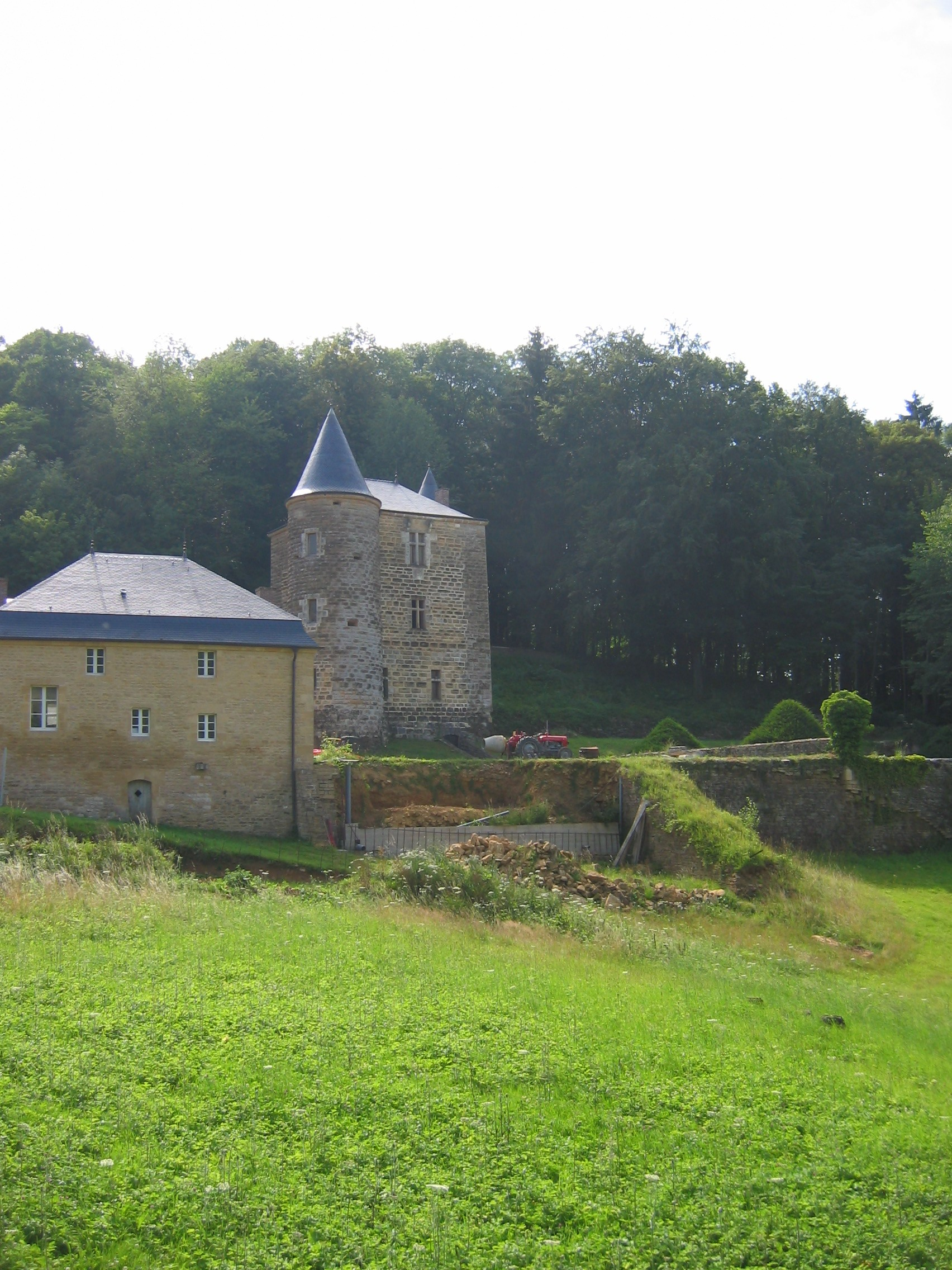
- Chateau of Rocan

- Coat of arms
- Location of Chéhéry
- Location within France Location within Grand Est
- Coordinates: 49°38′40″N 4°52′26″E
- Country: France
- Region: Grand Est
- Department: Ardennes
- Arrondissement: Sedan
- Canton: Sedan-Ouest
- Commune: Chémery-Chéhéry
- Area^{1}: 4.92 km^{2} (1.90 sq mi)
- Elevation: 164 m (538 ft)
- Highest elevation: 312 m (1,024 ft)
- Lowest elevation: 152 m (499 ft)
- Population (2023): 110
  - Density: 22/km^{2} (58/sq mi)
- Time zone: UTC+01:00 (CET)
  - Summer (DST): UTC+02:00 (CEST)
- Postal code: 08350
- ^{1} French Land Register data, which excludes lakes, ponds, glaciers > 1 km^{2} (0.386 sq mi or 247 acres) and river estuaries.

Chéhéry (French pronunciation: [ʃe.eʁi]) is a former commune in the Ardennes department in northern France. On 1 January 2016, it was merged into the new commune Chémery-Chéhéry.

== See also ==
- Communes of the Ardennes department
