= Floing, Ardennes =

Floing
- Commune
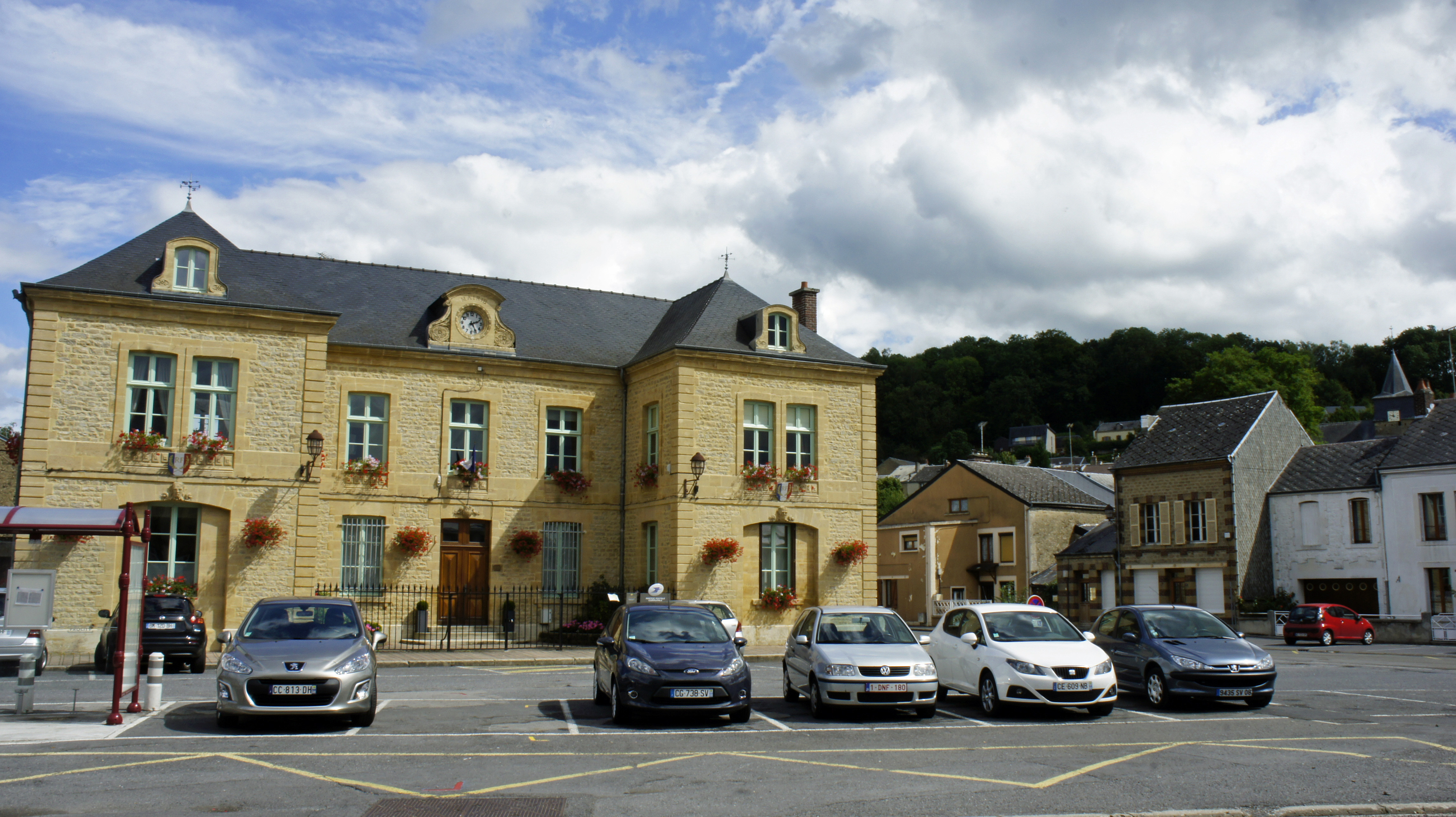
- Town hall

- Coat of arms
- Location of Floing
- Location within France Location within Grand Est
- Coordinates: 49°43′22″N 4°55′52″E
- Country: France
- Region: Grand Est
- Department: Ardennes
- Arrondissement: Sedan
- Canton: Sedan-2
- Intercommunality: CA Ardenne Métropole

Government
  - Mayor (2020–2026): Martine Lessertisseur
- Area^{1}: 7.43 km^{2} (2.87 sq mi)
- Elevation: 160 m (520 ft)
- Population (2023): 2,270
  - Density: 306/km^{2} (791/sq mi)
- Time zone: UTC+01:00 (CET)
  - Summer (DST): UTC+02:00 (CEST)
- INSEE/Postal code: 08174 /08200
- ^{1} French Land Register data, which excludes lakes, ponds, glaciers > 1 km^{2} (0.386 sq mi or 247 acres) and river estuaries.

Floing (French pronunciation: [flwɛ̃]) is a commune in the Ardennes department in northern France.

== Amenities ==
Floing has several hotels and restaurants. There is a beautiful nature including forest and open fields. Near Floing there are several trails for hiking and horse riding.

== Population ==
Historical population
Year	Pop.	±% p.a.
1968	2,332	—
1975	2,800	+2.65%
1982	2,890	+0.45%
1990	2,636	−1.14%
1999	2,454	−0.79%
2007	2,476	+0.11%
2012	2,485	+0.07%
2017	2,349	−1.12%
2023	2,270	−0.57%
Source: INSEE

== See also ==
- Communes of the Ardennes department
