= Sedan, Ardennes =

Sedan
- Subprefecture and commune
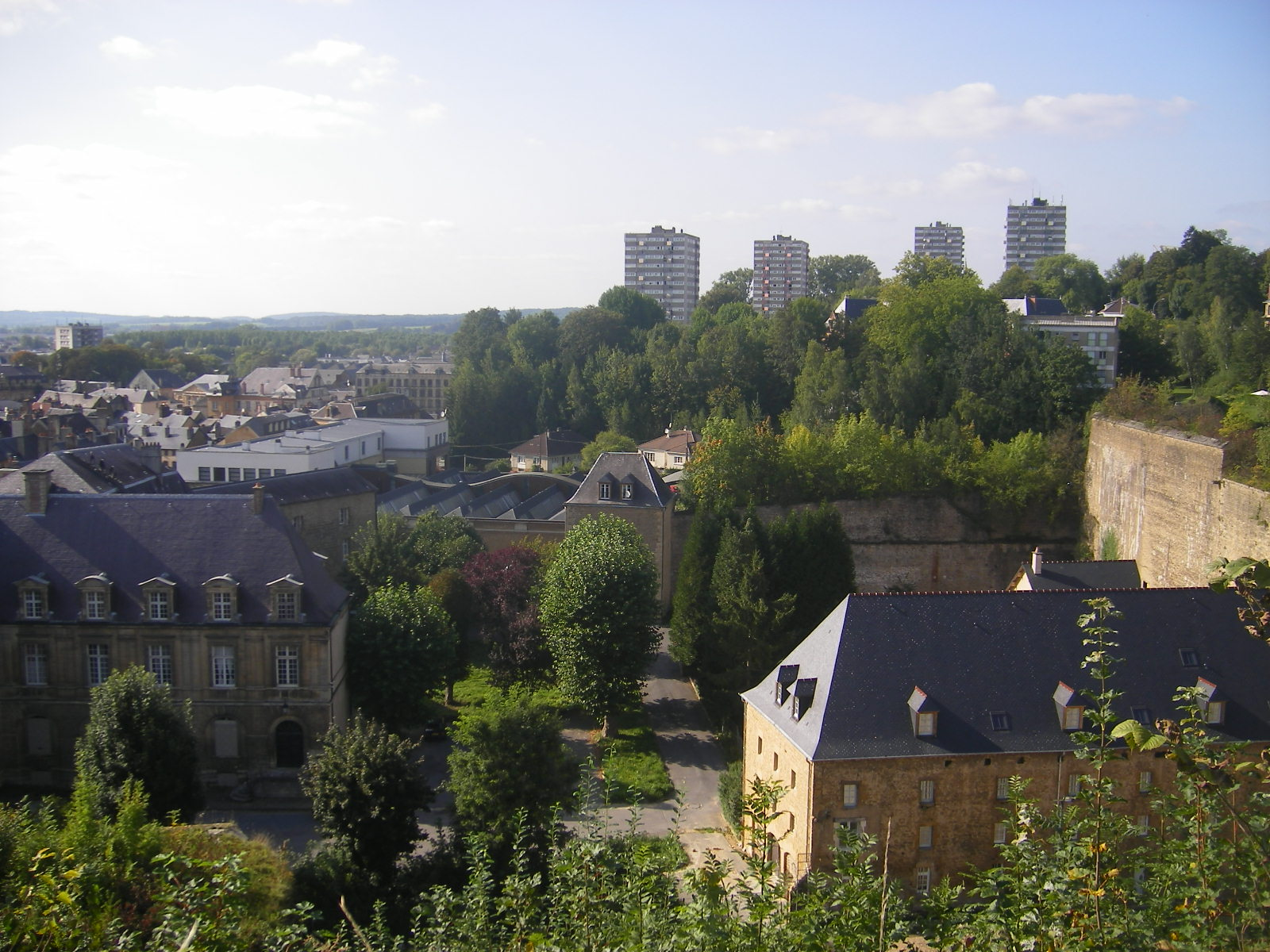
- Sedan in mid-September 2007

- Coat of arms
- Location of Sedan
- Location within France Location within Grand Est
- Coordinates: 49°42′12″N 4°56′20″E
- Country: France
- Region: Grand Est
- Department: Ardennes
- Arrondissement: Sedan
- Canton: Sedan-1, 2 and 3
- Intercommunality: CA Ardenne Métropole

Government
  - Mayor (2020–2026): Didier Herbillon
- Area^{1}: 16.28 km^{2} (6.29 sq mi)
- Elevation: 157 m (515 ft)
- Highest elevation: 301 m (988 ft)
- Lowest elevation: 149 m (489 ft)
- Population (2023): 16,667
  - Density: 1,024/km^{2} (2,652/sq mi)
- Time zone: UTC+01:00 (CET)
  - Summer (DST): UTC+02:00 (CEST)
- INSEE/Postal code: 08409 /08200
- ^{1} French Land Register data, which excludes lakes, ponds, glaciers > 1 km^{2} (0.386 sq mi or 247 acres) and river estuaries.

Sedan (French pronunciation: [sədɑ̃]) is a commune in the Ardennes department and Grand Est region of north-eastern France. It is also the chef-lieu (administrative centre) of the arrondissement of the same name.

Sedan is notable as the site of three major battles between the armed forces of France and Germany, two of which were won by Germany. The First Battle of Sedan in 1870 sealed the fate of the Second French Empire and paved the way to the foundation of the German Empire, leading to the subsequent annual celebration of "Sedan Day" in Germany. The Meuse–Argonne offensive saw France, boosted by American reinforcements, reclaim Sedan from German forces towards the end of World War I. The Second Battle of Sedan in 1940 achieved a decisive breakthrough by Wehrmacht forces in the Battle of France and ultimately led to the collapse of the French Third Republic.

== Location ==
The town is situated about 200 km from Paris, 85 km north-east of Reims, and 10 km south of the border with Belgium. The historic centre occupies a peninsula formed by a bend in the river Meuse. Sedan station has rail connections to Charleville-Mézières, Reims and Longwy. The A34 autoroute links Sedan with Charleville-Mézières and Reims.

== History ==
Sedan was founded in 1424. In the 16th century Sédan was an asylum for Protestant refugees from the Wars of Religion.

Until 1651, the Principality of Sedan belonged to the La Tour d'Auvergne family. It was at that time a sovereign principality. Their representative, Marshal Turenne, was born at Sedan on 11 September 1611. With help from the Holy Roman Empire, it defeated France at the Battle of La Marfée. Immediately after its victory, Sedan was besieged and its prince, Frédéric Maurice de La Tour d'Auvergne, duc de Bouillon, submitted to France. It was annexed to France in return for sparing the prince's life after he became involved in a conspiracy against France.

Sedan was the birthplace of Jacques MacDonald, a general who served in the Napoleonic Wars.

In the 1840s, American composer-pianist Louis Moreau Gottschalk got his start in Europe with a successful concert in Sedan, including the original piece "Souvenir des Ardennes."

During the Franco-Prussian War, on 2 September 1870, French emperor Napoleon III was taken prisoner with 100,000 of his soldiers at the First Battle of Sedan. Due to this victory, which made the unification of Germany possible, 2 September was declared Sedan Day (Sedantag) and a national German holiday in 1871. It remained a holiday until 1919.

Sedan was occupied by the Germans for four years during World War I. On 13 November 1917, the German Crown Prince paraded the 13th Infantry Division over the course of "d'Alsace-Lorraine".

From May 12 to 15, 1940, during World War II, German troops invaded neutral Belgium and crossed the river Meuse by winning the Second Battle of Sedan. The battle allowed them to win the Battle of France by bypassing the Maginot Line, which was the French fortification system, and entrapping the Allied Forces that were advancing east into Belgium, as part of the Allied Dyle Plan strategy.

== Points of interest ==
=== Castle ===
Today Sedan is known for its castle, which is claimed to be the largest fortified medieval castle in Europe with a total area of 30,000 square metres (7.4 acres) on seven levels. Construction started in 1424 and the castle's defences were constantly improved over the ages. It is the only remaining part of the once enormous fortifications in and around the town.

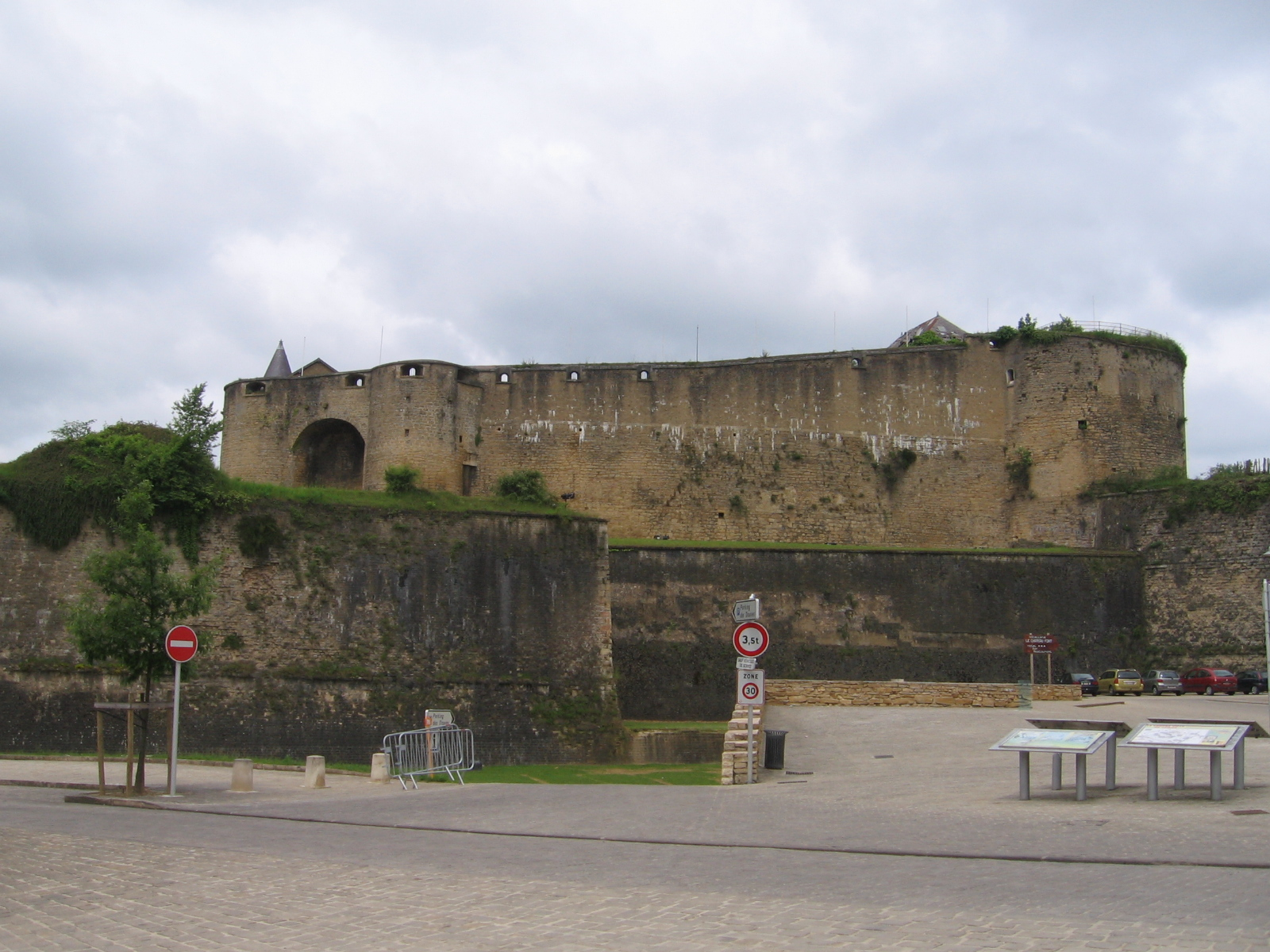
Sedan Castle

Central courtyard of the castle

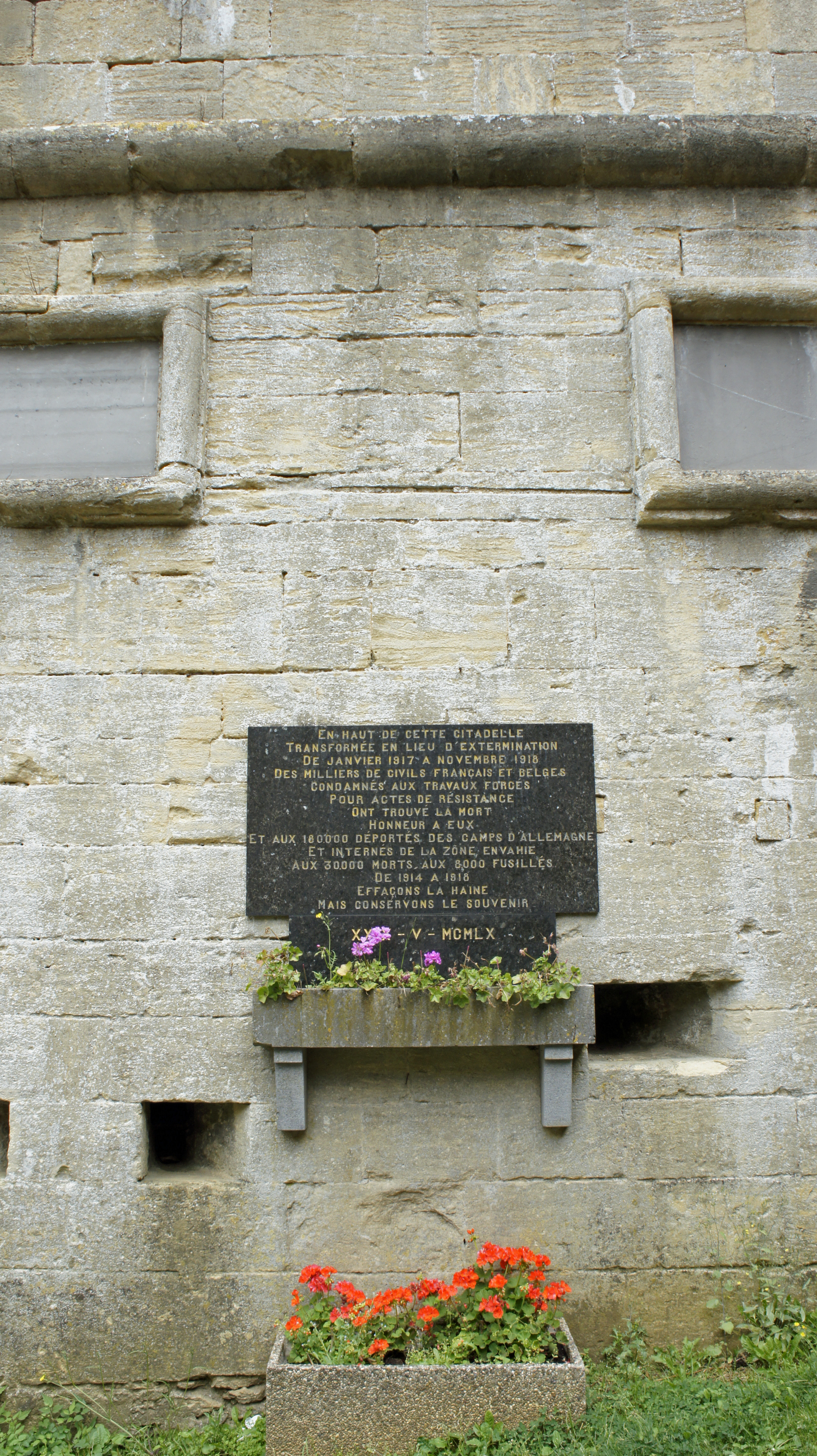
War memorial at the castle's Turenne gate

=== Other points of interest ===
- Jardin botanique de Sedan
- Festival médiéval de Sedan in May

== Population ==
Historical population

Year	Pop.	±% p.a.
1793	12,033	—
1800	10,634	−1.75%
1806	10,838	+0.32%
1821	12,123	+0.75%
1831	13,806	+1.31%
1836	14,536	+1.04%
1841	15,585	+1.40%
1846	14,635	−1.25%
1851	16,759	+2.75%
1866	13,793	−1.29%
1872	14,039	+0.30%
1876	16,593	+4.27%
1881	19,556	+3.34%
1886	19,306	−0.26%
1891	20,292	+1.00%
1896	20,163	−0.13%
1901	19,349	−0.82%
1906	19,599	+0.26%

Year	Pop.	±% p.a.
1911	19,516	−0.08%
1921	17,509	−1.08%
1926	18,298	+0.89%
1931	18,908	+0.66%
1936	18,559	−0.37%
1946	13,514	−3.12%
1954	17,637	+3.38%
1962	20,336	+1.80%
1968	23,037	+2.10%
1975	23,995	+0.58%
1982	23,477	−0.31%
1990	21,667	−1.00%
1999	20,548	−0.59%
2007	19,691	−0.53%
2012	18,430	−1.31%
2017	16,428	−2.27%
2023	16,667	+0.24%

Source: EHESS and INSEE (1968-2023)

== Economy ==
A centre of cloth production, begun under the patronage of Cardinal Mazarin, supported the town until the late nineteenth century.

== Sport ==
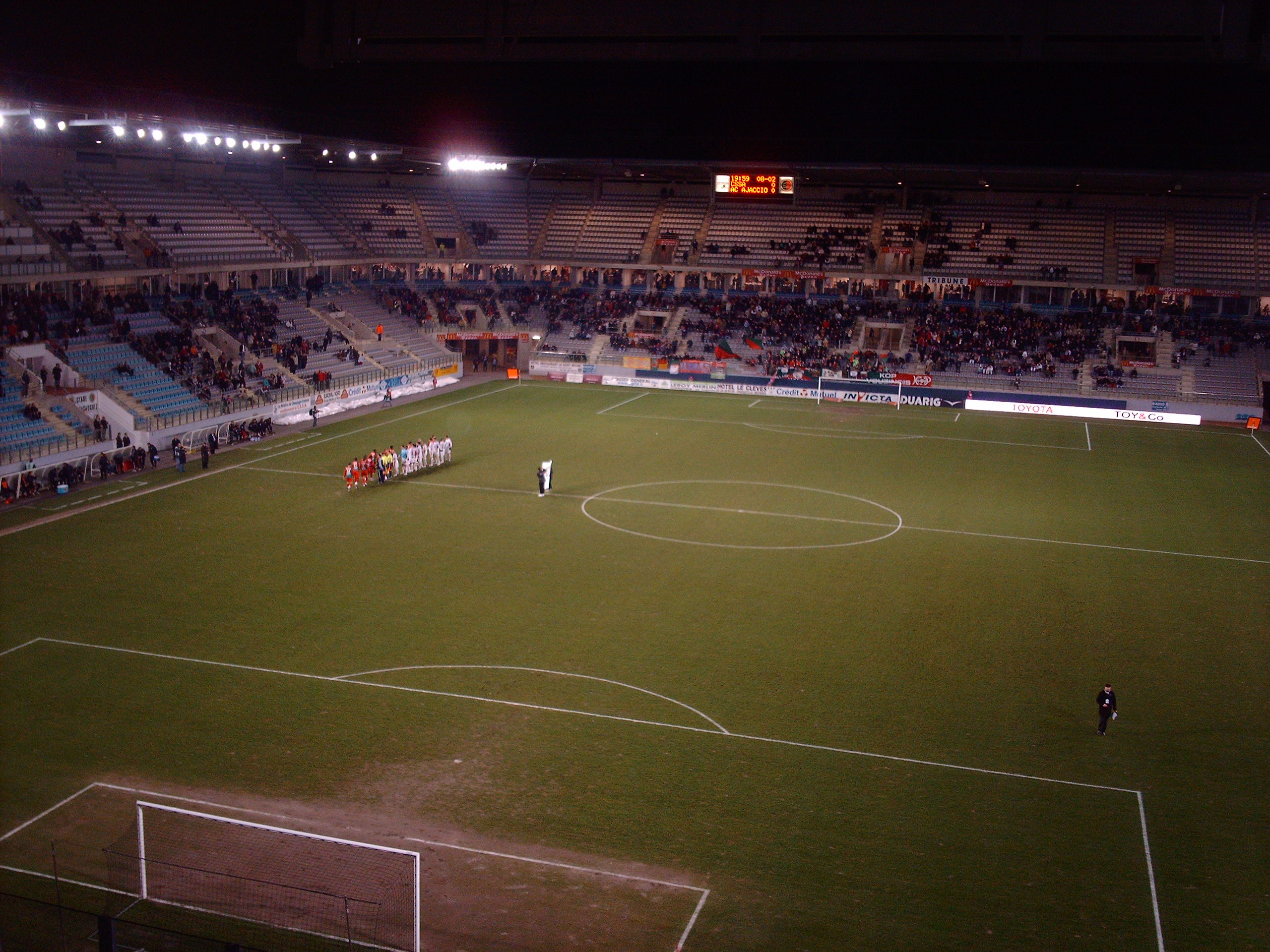
Stade Louis Dugauguez

CS Sedan Ardennes is based in the town.

== Notable people ==
- Charles Baudin (1792–1854), admiral
- Frédéric Brillant (born 1985), professional football player
- Élise Bussaglia (born 1985), professional football player
- Pierre Cartier (1932–2024), mathematician
- Jean de Collas (1678–1753), architect
- Yves Congar (1904–1995), French Dominican theologian and cardinal
- Robert Debré (1882–1978), physician
- Michel Fourniret (1942–2021), serial killer
- Frederick V (1596-1632), Count Palatine and Elector of the Palatinate from 1610 to 1623 and King of Bohemia (as Frederick I) from 1619 to 1620
- René Guyon (1876–1963), jurist
- Marie-Jeanne Larrivée Lemière (1733 - 1786), dramatic soprano
- Étienne-Jacques-Joseph-Alexandre MacDonald (1765–1840), Marshal of France
- Yannick Noah (born 1960), former professional tennis player
- Vicomte de Turenne (1611–1675), Marshal of France

== Twin towns ==
- Eisenach, Germany, since 1991
- (United States) Sedan, Kansas

== Climate ==
Climate data for Sedan (Douzy) (2002–2020 normals, extremes 2002–present)
Month	Jan	Feb	Mar	Apr	May	Jun	Jul	Aug	Sep	Oct	Nov	Dec	Year
Record high °C (°F)	15.8 (60.4)	19.6 (67.3)	25.5 (77.9)	28.6 (83.5)	32.1 (89.8)	36.2 (97.2)	40.3 (104.5)	38.6 (101.5)	34.9 (94.8)	27.0 (80.6)	19.6 (67.3)	16.0 (60.8)	40.3 (104.5)
Mean daily maximum °C (°F)	5.5 (41.9)	6.8 (44.2)	11.4 (52.5)	16.3 (61.3)	19.5 (67.1)	23.4 (74.1)	25.1 (77.2)	24.2 (75.6)	20.7 (69.3)	15.4 (59.7)	9.8 (49.6)	6.3 (43.3)	15.4 (59.7)
Daily mean °C (°F)	2.8 (37.0)	3.3 (37.9)	6.4 (43.5)	10.0 (50.0)	13.4 (56.1)	17.1 (62.8)	18.8 (65.8)	18.2 (64.8)	14.6 (58.3)	10.9 (51.6)	6.8 (44.2)	3.6 (38.5)	10.5 (50.9)
Mean daily minimum °C (°F)	0.0 (32.0)	−0.2 (31.6)	1.3 (34.3)	3.6 (38.5)	7.3 (45.1)	10.8 (51.4)	12.4 (54.3)	12.1 (53.8)	8.5 (47.3)	6.4 (43.5)	3.7 (38.7)	0.9 (33.6)	5.6 (42.1)
Record low °C (°F)	−14.8 (5.4)	−14.4 (6.1)	−11.7 (10.9)	−7.0 (19.4)	−3.8 (25.2)	1.1 (34.0)	3.7 (38.7)	3.0 (37.4)	−1.2 (29.8)	−6.6 (20.1)	−8.6 (16.5)	−14.4 (6.1)	−14.8 (5.4)
Average precipitation mm (inches)	89.6 (3.53)	70.6 (2.78)	62.3 (2.45)	47.2 (1.86)	68.4 (2.69)	77.2 (3.04)	62.9 (2.48)	81.3 (3.20)	46.2 (1.82)	72.3 (2.85)	75.0 (2.95)	104.0 (4.09)	857.0 (33.74)
Average precipitation days (≥ 1.0 mm)	13.8	11.6	10.9	8.6	10.9	9.2	9.6	10.9	7.1	10.0	12.4	14.2	129.2
Source: Meteociel

== See also ==
- Communes of the Ardennes department
- CS Sedan Ardennes, football club based in Sedan
- French Towns and Lands of Art and History
- Sedan chair
- Stade Louis Dugauguez, a multi-use stadium in Sedan
