= Fleigneux =

- Commune
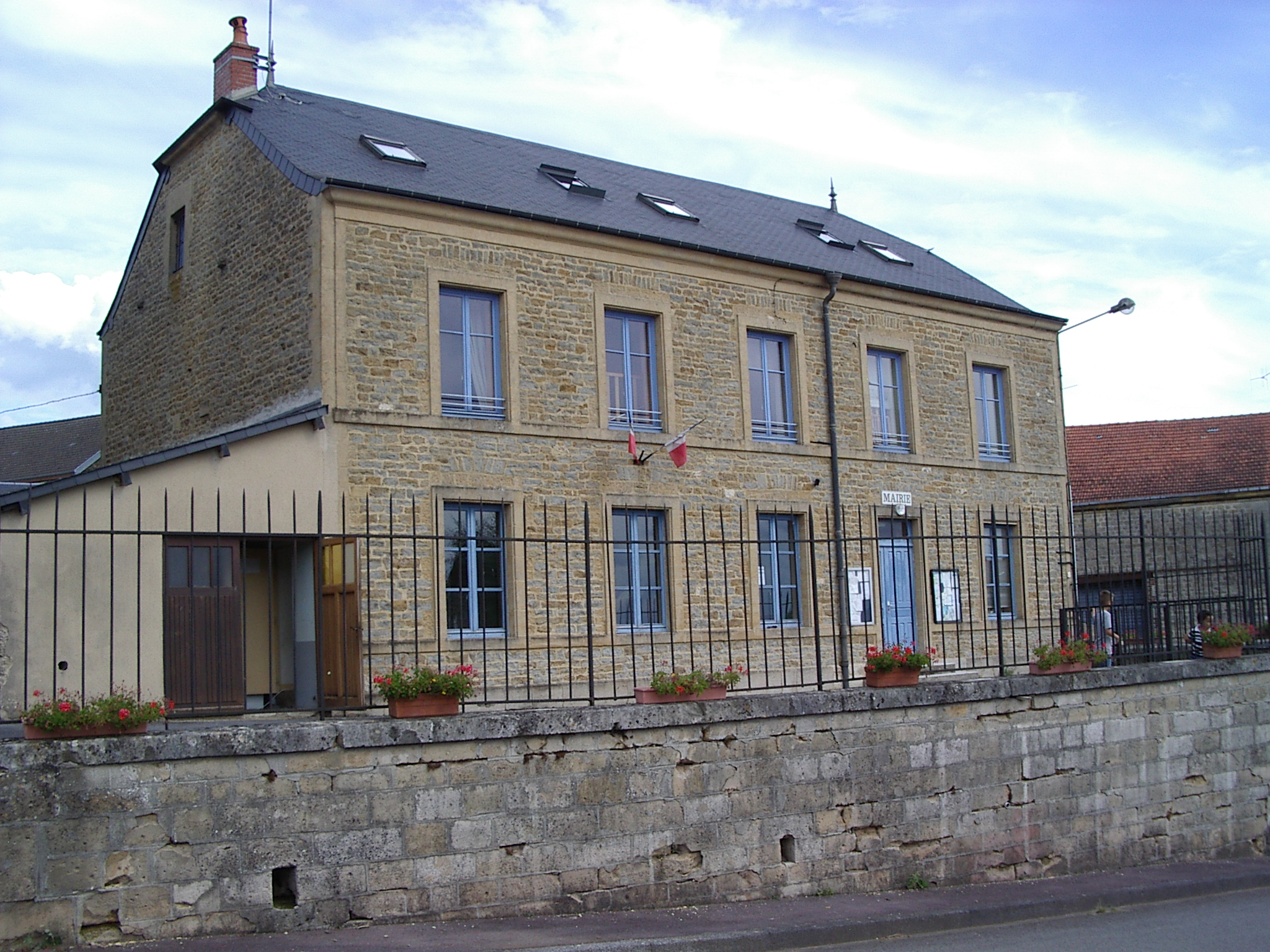
- The town hall

- Coat of arms
- Location of Fleigneux
- Location within France Location within Grand Est
- Coordinates: 49°44′55″N 4°56′57″E
- Country: France
- Region: Grand Est
- Department: Ardennes
- Arrondissement: Sedan
- Canton: Sedan-2
- Intercommunality: CA Ardenne Métropole

Government
  - Mayor (2020–2026): Pierre Cornet
- Area^{1}: 13.65 km^{2} (5.27 sq mi)
- Elevation: 270 m (890 ft)
- Highest elevation: 421 m (1,381 ft)
- Lowest elevation: 199 m (653 ft)
- Population (2023): 223
  - Density: 16.3/km^{2} (42.3/sq mi)
- Time zone: UTC+01:00 (CET)
  - Summer (DST): UTC+02:00 (CEST)
- INSEE/Postal code: 08170 /08200
- ^{1} French Land Register data, which excludes lakes, ponds, glaciers > 1 km^{2} (0.386 sq mi or 247 acres) and river estuaries.

Fleigneux is a commune in the Ardennes department in northern France.

== Population ==
Historical population
Year	Pop.	±% p.a.
1968	145	—
1975	141	−0.40%
1982	158	+1.64%
1990	170	+0.92%
1999	201	+1.88%
2007	229	+1.64%
2012	201	−2.57%
2017	202	+0.10%
2023	223	+1.66%
Source: INSEE

== See also ==
- Communes of the Ardennes department
