= 41st Army Corps (France) =

41e Corps de Armée
- Active: 1939-1940
- Country: France
- Type: Army Corps
- Role: Defend the fortifications
- Engagements: World War II

Commanders
- Notable commanders: Emmanuel Urbain Libaud

The French 41st Army Corps was a French military unit during the Second World War. Under the command of General Emmanuel Urbain Libaud the corps, under heavy Luftwaffe attack, held a crossing of the Meuse river against assaults by the German XXXXI Panzer Corps until 15 May.
