= Chémery-sur-Bar =

- Part of Chémery-Chéhéry
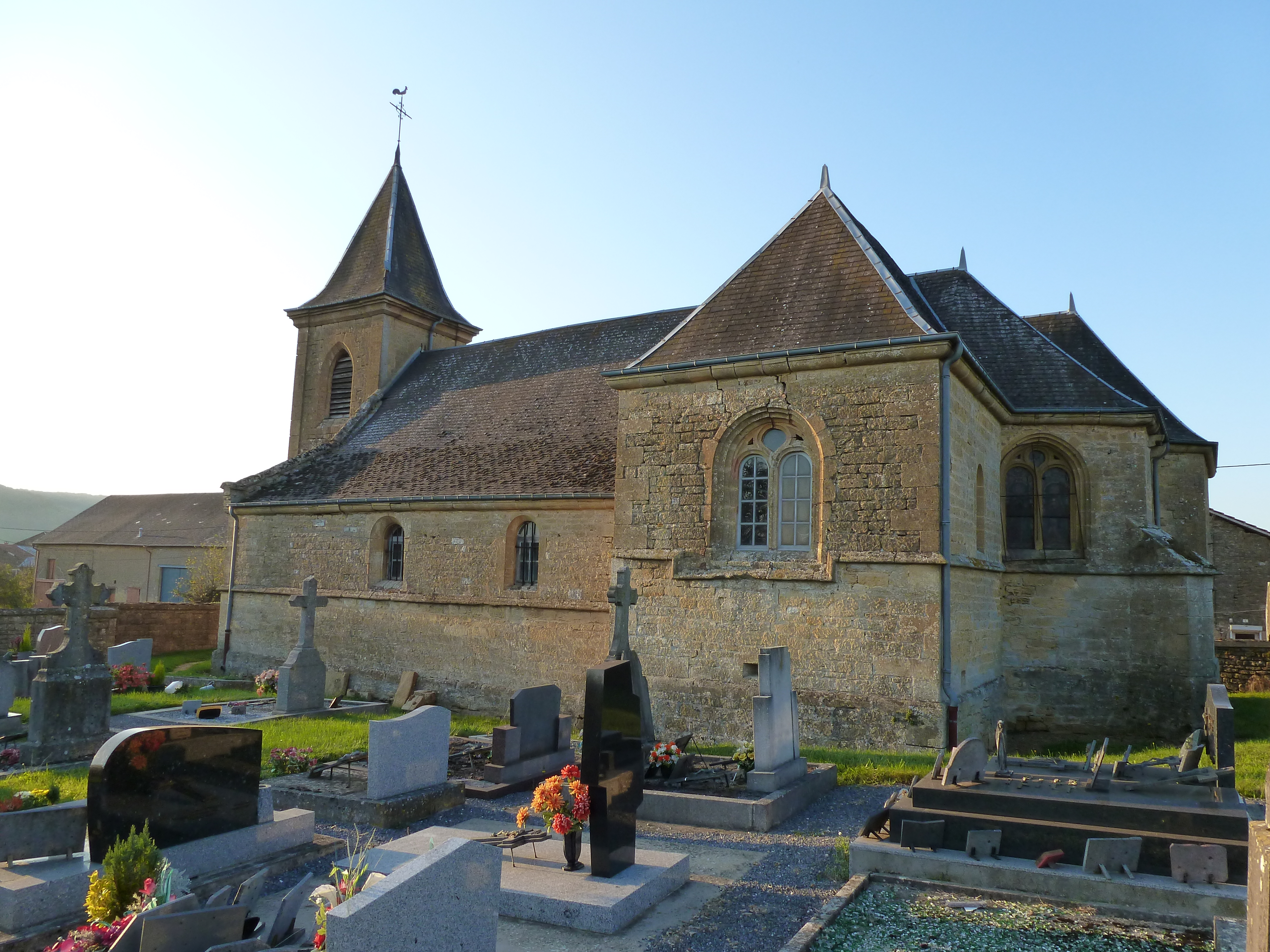

- Coat of arms
- Location of Chémery-sur-Bar
- Location within France Location within Grand Est
- Coordinates: 49°36′03″N 4°52′11″E
- Country: France
- Region: Grand Est
- Department: Ardennes
- Arrondissement: Sedan
- Canton: Raucourt-et-Flaba
- Commune: Chémery-Chéhéry
- Area^{1}: 22.87 km^{2} (8.83 sq mi)
- Elevation: 164 m (538 ft)
- Population (2023): 404
  - Density: 17.7/km^{2} (45.8/sq mi)
- Time zone: UTC+01:00 (CET)
  - Summer (DST): UTC+02:00 (CEST)
- Postal code: 08450
- ^{1} French Land Register data, which excludes lakes, ponds, glaciers > 1 km^{2} (0.386 sq mi or 247 acres) and river estuaries.

Chémery-sur-Bar (French pronunciation: [ʃemʁi syʁ baʁ], literally Chémery on Bar, before 1959: Chémery) is a former commune in the Ardennes department in northern France. On 1 January 2016, it was merged into the new commune Chémery-Chéhéry.

== See also ==
- Communes of the Ardennes department
