= Matton =

Matton may refer to:

== People ==
- Anouk Matton (born 1992), Belgian disc jockey
- Arsène Matton (1873–1953), Belgian sculptor
- Charles Matton (1931-2008), French artist
- Ida Matton (1863–1940), Swedish sculptor
- Jean Matton (1888–1917), French World War I cavalryman and flying ace
- Léonard Matton (born in 1979), French actor and director
- Roger Matton (1929-2004), Canadian composer, ethnomusicologist, and music educator
- Thomas Matton (born 24 October 1985, Belgian footballer

== Places ==
- Matton-et-Clémency, a commune in the Ardennes department in northern France
  - Matton (commune), former commune in northern France now part of the merged commune Matton-et-Clémency
  - Arboretum de Matton-Clémency, an arboretum located in Matton-et-Clémency, Ardennes
- Matton (river), small French river in the department of Ardennes

== Other uses ==
- Matton (mythology) is a figure in Greek mythology.
- Matton Shipyard, a historic shipyard and canal boat service yard located on Van Schaick Island at Cohoes in Albany County, New York

== See also ==
- Mattan (disambiguation)
- Matten, a village in Switzerland
- Maton
