= Matton (river) =

River in France

- Location within France Location within Grand Est

Location
- Countries: Belgium and France

Physical characteristics
- Mouth: Aulnois
  - coordinates: 49°38′26″N 5°09′31″E
- Length: ca. 9 km (5.6 mi)

Basin features
- Progression: Aulnois→ Chiers→ Meuse→ North Sea

The river Matton, also named Banel, is a small river in the departement of Ardennes, France. Its uppermost part lies on the border between Belgium and France. It is a tributary of the river Aulnois, joining it at Carignan, also in the Ardennes. The Matton runs from north-east to south-west, passing through the two communes of Matton-et-Clémency and Carignan. Its length in France is 7.9 km (4.9 mi).
