= Mattan =

Mattan may refer to:

== Places ==
- Mattan, Jammu and Kashmir, a town in India

== People ==
- Matan (given name), also spelt Mattan, a Hebrew given name
- Mattan, a minor Biblical figure
- Mattan I, a 9th-century BC Phoenician king
- Mahmood Hussein Mattan (1923-1952), Somali seaman wrongfully convicted of murder
- Nico Mattan (born 1971), Belgian cyclist
- Pritam Singh Mattan, Mauritian executive

== See also ==
- Matan (disambiguation)
- Matton (disambiguation)
