= Aulnois =

Aulnois may refer to:

- Aulnois, Vosges, a commune of Vosges, France
- Aulnois, Belgium, a village in Hainaut, Belgium
- Aulnois (river), a Franco-Belgian river
