= Prem Nath Bazaz =

Kashmiri scholar, author and politician

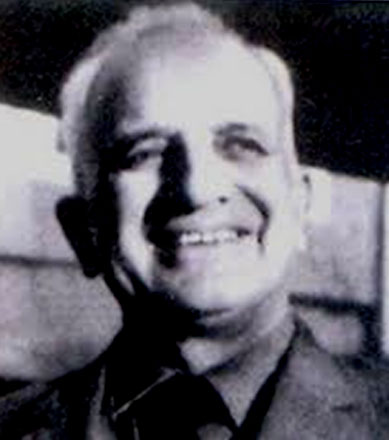
- Born: July 13, 1905
- Died: 1984 (aged 78 or 79)
- Occupations: Politician; scholar; author
- Children: 9, including Bhushan

Prem Nath Bazaz (13 July 1905 – 1984) was a Kashmiri communist politician, scholar, and author. Born in Mattan into a Kashmiri Pandit family, he was a secularist and a democrat who founded two political parties, Kashmir Socialist Party, and Kisan Mazdoor Conference. He was the architect of the famous ethnonationalist slogan "Kashmir belongs to Kashmiris", and was an ardent supporter of the Kashmiri-separatist movement till the end.

== Career ==
In the preface of his book, History of Struggle for Freedom in Kashmir, he wrote: "It is the voice of one who believes that the future of Kashmir, owing to its past traditions and culture, is inextricably linked with both her neighbours. But Kashmir belongs to Kashmiris and neither the Maharaja had, or any outsider has, however powerful he may be, any right to dictate about its future."

Prem Nath famously said "The Dogras have always considered Jammu as their home and Kashmir as the conquered country…They established a sort of Dogra imperialism in the State in which all non-Dogra communities and classes were given the humble place of inferiors…Dogra imperialism brought nothing but misery, thraldom, physical and mental deterioration in its wake…"

== Personal life ==
Bazaz was born on 13 July 1905. Bazaz had 9 children; 4 sons and 5 daughters. One of his sons, Bhushan, headed the "Jammu and Kashmir Democratic Forum". Bazaz died in 1984.

== Notable works ==
He has authored several books with Kashmir as the central theme. Some of these books include:

- Inside Kashmir (1941)
- The History of Struggle for Freedom in Kashmir: Cultural and Political, from the Earliest Times to the Present Day (1954)
- Daughters of the Vitasta: A History of Kashmiri Women from Early Times to the Present Day (1959)
- Democracy Through Intimidation and Terror: The Untold Story of Kashmir Politics (1978)
- Secular Morality: A Solvent of Contemporary Spiritual Crisis (1978)
- The Role of Bhagawat Gita in Indian History (1975)
