= Aulnois (river) =

River flowing from Belgium to France

Aulnois Aunois
- Location within France Location within Grand Est

Location
- Countries: Belgium; France

Physical characteristics
- Source
  - location: province of Luxembourg, Wallonia, Belgium
- Mouth: Chiers
  - location: Carignan, Ardennes, France
  - coordinates: 49.6345°N 5.1443°E
- Length: 18 km (11 mi)
- Discharge
  - average: 2.10 m^{3}/s (74 cu ft/s)

Basin features
- Progression: Chiers→ Meuse→ North Sea
- Tributaries
  - left: Matton
  - right: La Goutelle

The Aulnois (French pronunciation: [onwa]; also: Aunois) is a Franco-Belgian river which flows in the French Ardennes département and in the province of Luxembourg in the far south of Belgian Wallonia. It is about 18 km (11 mi) long, of which 7 km in France. It is a fairly fast-flowing right tributary of the Chiers.

== Geography ==
The Aulnois rises in the forest of Muno which stretches over the south of the Belgian province of Luxembourg. It generally flows southwards throughout its course. After crossing the Franco-Belgian border it continues towards the south until its confluence with the Chiers, which occurs at Carignan in the Ardennes just after the Aulnois has received its main tributary, the Matton.

=== Localities along the Aulnois ===
The Aulnois flows through the French communes of Messincourt, Pure, Osnes and Carignan, all in the Ardennes département. In Belgium it flows through Muno, part of the Florenville municipality in the province of Luxembourg.

=== Tributaries ===
- La Goutelle, a right tributary, received at Messincourt.
- Matton, a left tributary received at Carignan.

== Hydrology ==
The Aulnois is a small but substantial river. At its confluence with the Chiers, its mean annual flow rate or discharge rises to 2.10 cubic metres per second (74 cu ft/s) for a watershed of 101.8 square kilometres (39.3 mi^{2}). The runoff curve number in the watershed is 651 millimetres (25.6 in), which is very high, approximately twice the average for France including all watersheds. It is also higher even than the French Meuse basin, which is itself relatively high, at 450 millimetres (18 in) at Chooz near the border. Its specific flow rate thus reaches the high value of 20.6 litres per second per square kilometre of watershed.

== Heritage ==
- Messincourt, with the remains of a castle razed at the beginning of the 16th century having many underground works, a former church with a bell tower from the 18th century and a building in the centre from the 12th and 13th centuries called the "Château", as well as woods and forests.
- Pure, with an old church reconstructed in 1830, forges, and woodland.
- Osnes, a village which once hosted a significant metallurgy industry. It has a 16th-century church restored in the 18th century. The church has a 12th-century altar and an educational display.
- Carignan, the former Gallo-Roman Epoisso Vicus, constructed on the road from Reims to Trèves. Known as "Yvois" up until its annexation to France in the 1659 Treaty of the Pyrenees (1659), it was razed to the ground by Gaspard III de Coligny. It has a Gallo-Roman villa and a Merovingian Necropolis, as well as the remains of the fortified compound from the 16th century, reconstituted in the 17th century with curtain walls, bastions and casemates, and the 17th century Porte de Bourgogne guardhouse. Carignan also has a collegiate church from the 16th and 17th centuries featuring a 16th-century virgin with child and pictures from the 17th and 18th centuries, as well as hosting the "Conservatoire de l'Outil" tool museum, a gymnastic association and a sports club.

== See also ==
- List of rivers of France
- List of rivers of Belgium
- Meuse
- Chiers
- Carignan, Ardennes
