= Wulflaich =

Lombard Catholic deacon

Wulflaich (Note: Also spelled Vulfolaic, Vulfilaic or Wulfilach, French Walfroy.) was a Lombard Catholic deacon and holy man in 6th-century Francia. He is known only from the Ten Books of Histories of Gregory of Tours, who recounts how he chose to live as a stylite (that is, atop a pillar) in the diocese of Trier during the episcopate of Magneric (before 587) and the reign of King Childebert II (576–596).

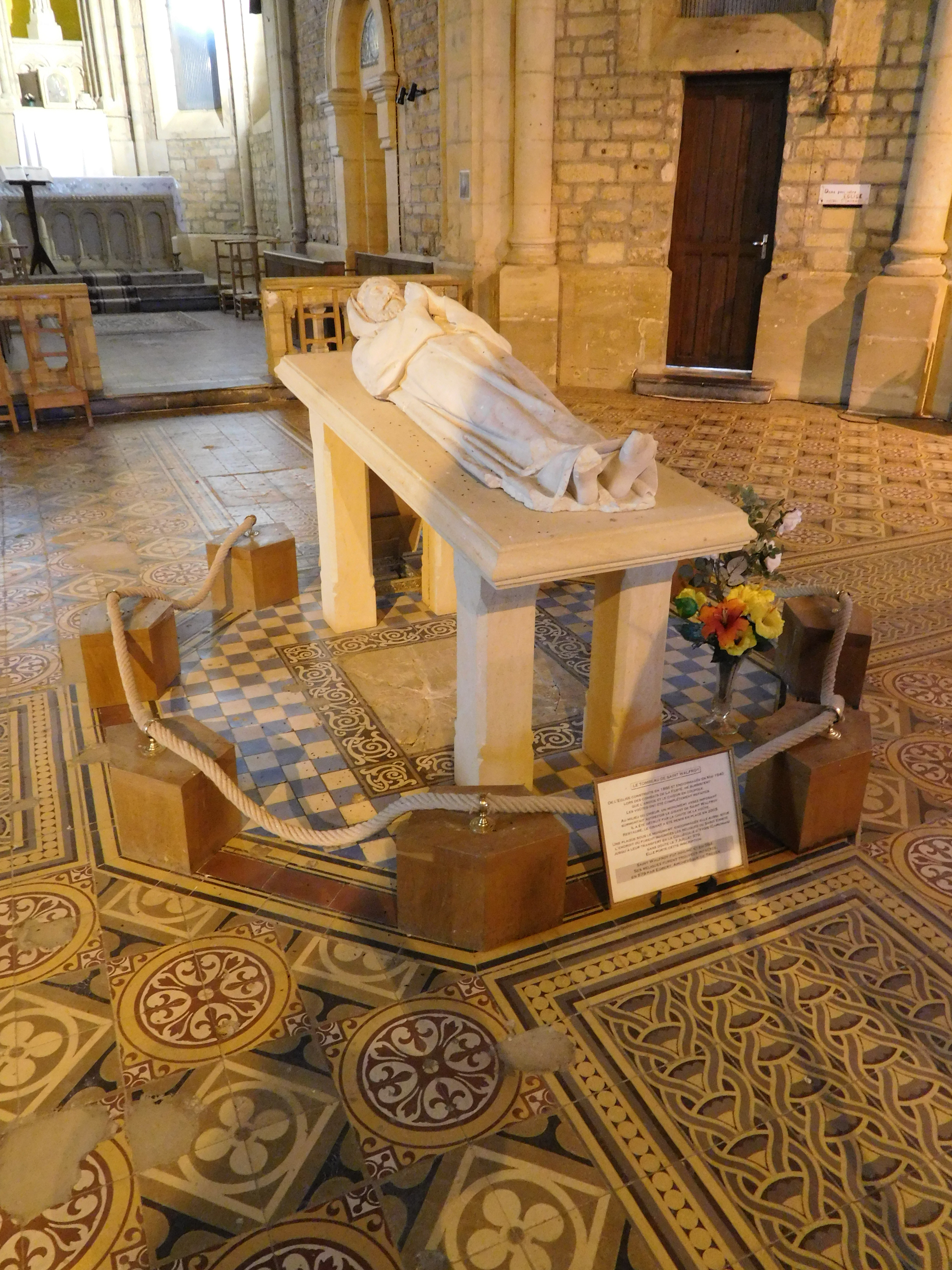
Tomb of Wulflaich

Gregory met Wulflaich at the castle of Yvois and accompanied him to the monastery he had built on a hill some eight miles away. He reports Wulflaich's own account of his conversion. The Lombard was a disciple of Aredius, abbot of Limoges, when the two visited the shrine of Saint Martin at Tours. The abbot collected some dust from Martin's tomb and placed it in a capsule as a relic. When the relic was placed in a box, the box filled with dust. This miracles convinced Wulflaich to found his own monastery outside Trier. He found the locals still worshipping Diana, so he erected a pillar and stood on top of it:

I myself set up a column, on which I remained standing with bare feet, no matter how much it hurt me. When winter came in its season, it so froze me with its icy frost that the bitter cold made my toenails fall off, not once but several times, and the rain turned to ice and hung from my beard like the wax which melts from candles. This district is famous for its harsh winters.

His preaching eventually had its effect. The inhabitants pulled the statue of Diana down with ropes and broke it up with hammers. The local bishops, however, ordered him to come down from his pillar:

It is not right, what you are trying to do! Such an obscure person as you can never be compared with Simeon the Stylite of Antioch! The climate of the region makes it impossible for you to keep tormenting yourself in this way. Come down off your column, and live with the brethren whom you have gathered around you.

Although he disagreed with the bishops, he complied and the bishops destroyed the column.
