= Klinikum am Weissenhof =

German psychiatric hospital, opened 1903

Coordinates: 49°09′55″N 9°17′36″E

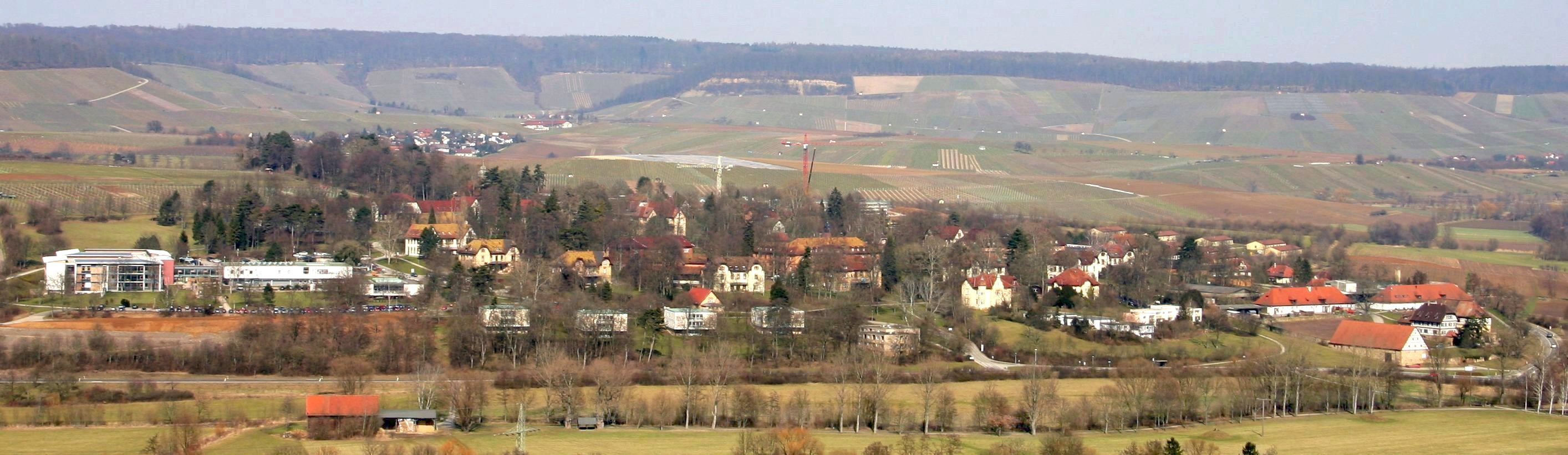
The Klinikum am Weissenhof with the old manor Weißenhof on the far right and the new buildings of 2002 on the far left

The Klinikum am Weissenhof is a psychiatric hospital in Weinsberg. It was opened in 1903 as a royal sanatorium on the public domain of Weißenhof.

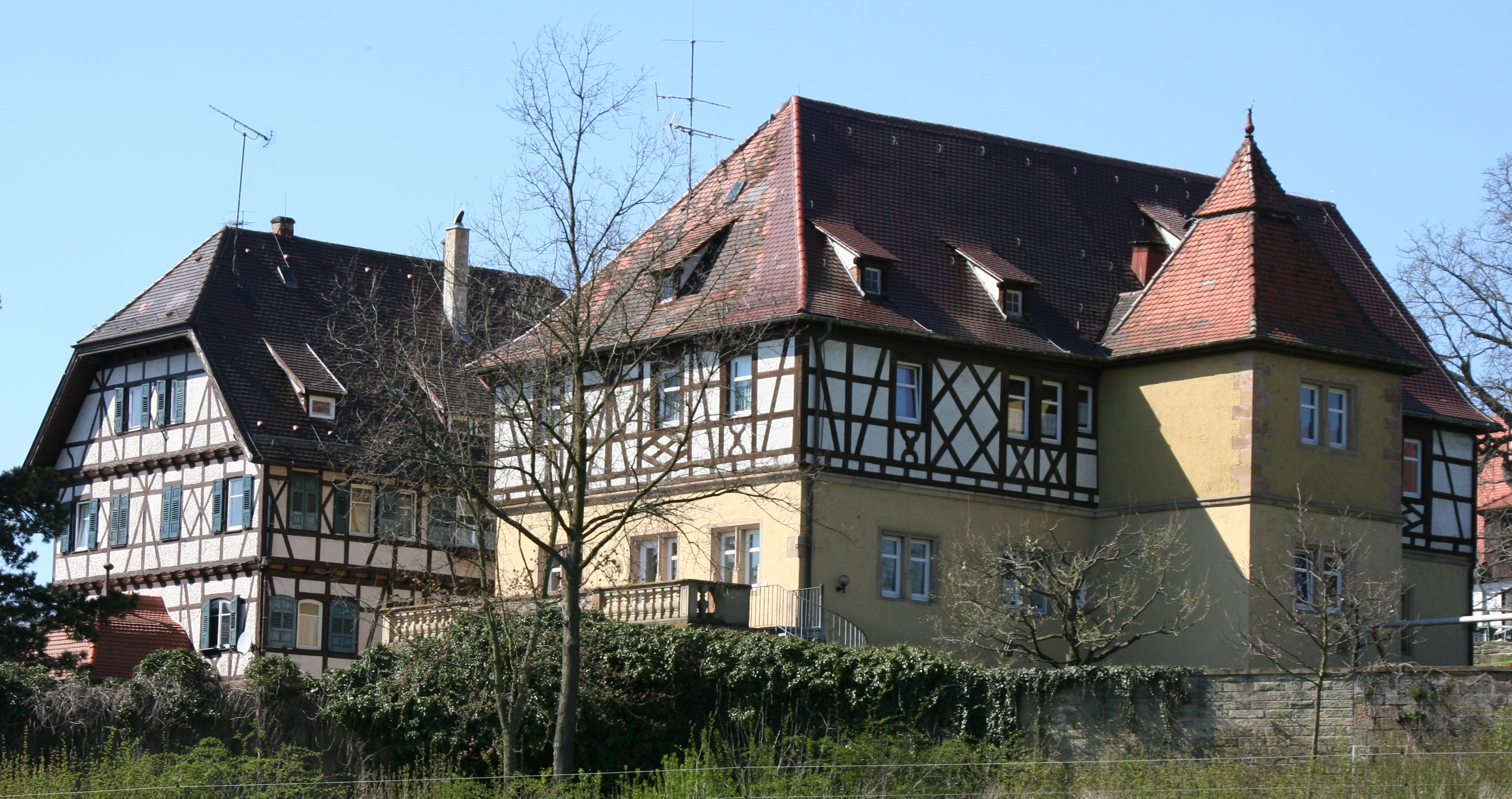
Courtyard buildings of Weißenhof

== History ==
Toward the end of the 19th century the four existing public sanatoria for the mentally ill in Württemberg (in Zwiefalten, Winnental, Schussenried and Weißenau) were overcrowded. Numerous invalids had to be rejected and accommodated in ordinary hospitals or sent back to their hometowns, where they could not be treated properly. There were no psychiatric institutions in the north of Württemberg, which was particularly problematic for the mentally ill and their relatives of those regions, since they had to travel large distances in order to receive treatment.

In 1897/98 the federal state Wurttemberg wanted to build a fifth state owned psychiatric institute. The search for a suitable construction site started in the north of Wurtemberg. The site would have to be located in a quiet area on one hand, but at the same time it should be near a train station and a large town. Consequently, the public domain of Weißenhof, a century old estate, was chosen. It is situated only two kilometres away from the local train station of Weinsberg and six kilometres from the city of Heilbronn. On 6 July 1899 the chamber of representatives granted three million Mark for the construction of the institution. At the beginning the institution was supposed to accommodate 500 patients, which could be increased by 50 more patients upon the completion of the construction.

In the fall of 1900 the construction of the mental hospital began with the building of a water supply system. In March 1901 a park was created on a small hill above the Sulmtal about 1 kilometer north of Weinsberg. The park was located right next to the court buildings and was set up in a pavilion system covering several individual hospital wards. In the beginning the wards were strictly separated, the western half of the park was dedicated to male patients and the eastern half to female patients. The administration buildings were put up in the center of the park. On 23 November the first patients were admitted and in 1905 the sanatorium was filled to capacity. First director of the institution was Paul Kemmler. From 1913 to 1915 an institutional church was built in the north of the area and a small cemetery was set up next to it. However, today there are no funerals being held anymore.

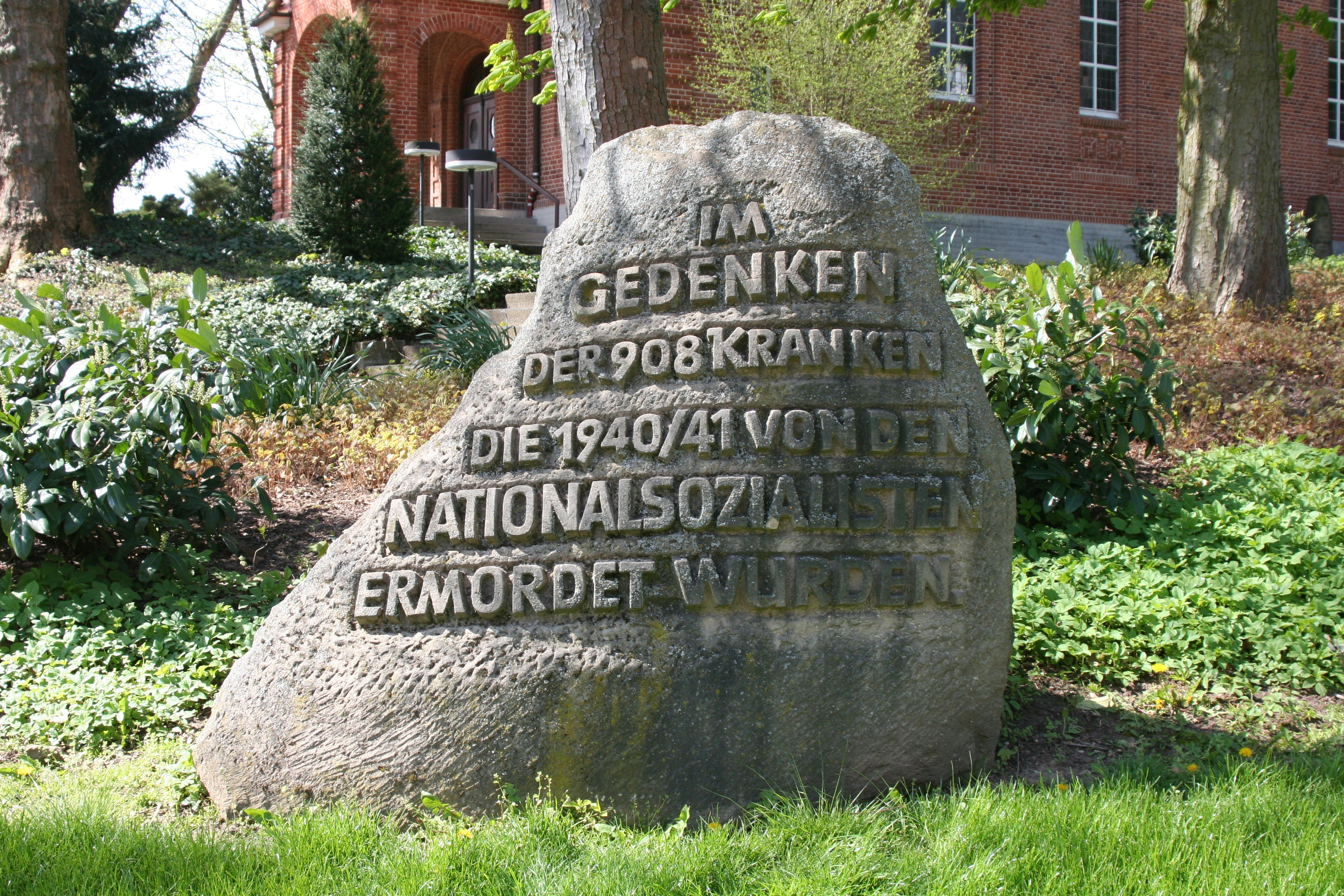
Memorial stone commemorating the murdered patients during the national socialist regime of Germany near the clinic's church

Within the context of Aktion T4 in Nazi Germany, patients of the Weinsberg institute were transported to the Grafeneck Euthanasia Centre where they were executed. Later on it was used as a Zwischenanstalt, a kind of temporary encampment, for the Hadamar Euthanasia Centre. The patients were placed there temporarily, awaiting their transport to Hadamar and their impending execution. From January 1940 until the end of 1941 a total of 908 patients were transported from Weisenberg to euthanasia centers. 426 people were patients directly from Weisenberg and 482 were patients from other hospitals. Furthermore, between the years of 1934 and 1945 96 male and 107 female patients have been forcefully sterilized as part of the Law for the Prevention of Genetically Diseased Offspring.

The unoccupied rooms were used as a tuberculosis sanatorium between 1943 and 1946. During the Second World War parts of the hospital of Heilbronn were relocated to Weisenberg from 1941 until 1952. This was due to the imminent threat and following destruction of the hospital by airstrikes in 1944.

Karl Eugen Jooss, deputy chairman since 1936 and acting chairman of the institution since 1940, tried to fight the establishment of an assembly point for euthanasia transports. One of the reasons for his refusal were the rising numbers of deaths, which made the purpose of the transports clear.

However, officer Otto Mauthe, who worked for the internal affairs office of Württemberg and was responsible for the Aktion T4, threatened to close the institution if Jooss were not willing to comply. Consequently, Jooss only succeeded partially, since the institution still served as an assembly point but its employees did not actively participate in the execution of the transports.

At a later point, Mauthe tried to justify himself by saying that he had been forced to act. He also claimed that originally the institution had been designated to serve as a Napo-School.

Despite the risk of being killed for a breach of secrecy, Jooss told his closest colleagues about the true purpose of the transports. By declaring patients able to work or letting their relatives pick them up from the institution, numerous lives were saved. In September 1945, director Jooss committed suicide as it became public knowledge that the US-American occupation forces wanted to unseat him.

At the beginning of the 60s a new hospital ward was built in the west of the compound, which was mainly demolished in 2000/01 and replaced by a new building.

The building of a new structure for the forensic psychiachtry department led to some public turmoil in 2003. The new building was constructed to house 50 patients with mental disorders against which a local initiative collected signatures and addressed a petition to the Landtag (the legislative assembly) of Baden-Württemberg. Nevertheless, constructions went on and complying to all requirements the building was officially inaugurated on 18 May 2006. In 2007 however, the city approved of some temporary adjustments to the concept. These changes would allow that 25 patients with mental illness and 25 patients with drug-addiction would be accommodated in the new building. Another 25 patients would be situated in other buildings of the clinic, which makes a total of 100 patients living in forensic commitment at the Klinikum am Weißenhof.

In June 2007 the clinic opened up two new day-units in the nearby city of Heilbronn. One of these new day-hospitals had already been established on the clinic's compound in January 2006 and moved from there to Heilbronn, this unit provides general psychiatric treatments and psychotherapy. The other, newly established unit, provides treatment for geropsychiatric patients. Both units are located in the former Privatklinik Dr. Reinhard, a private hospital which was bought by the Klinikum am Weisenhof in March 2006. The clinic invested 3 million Euros in this project.

On the first of January 2010 the neurology department of the clinic, with its 70 beds and 90 employees, was passed over to the SLK-Kliniken, the hospital of the city of Heilbronn. At the beginning of 2011, the department was moved into a newly constructed building of the Gesundbrunnen-Klinikum in Heilbronn.

== The clinic today ==
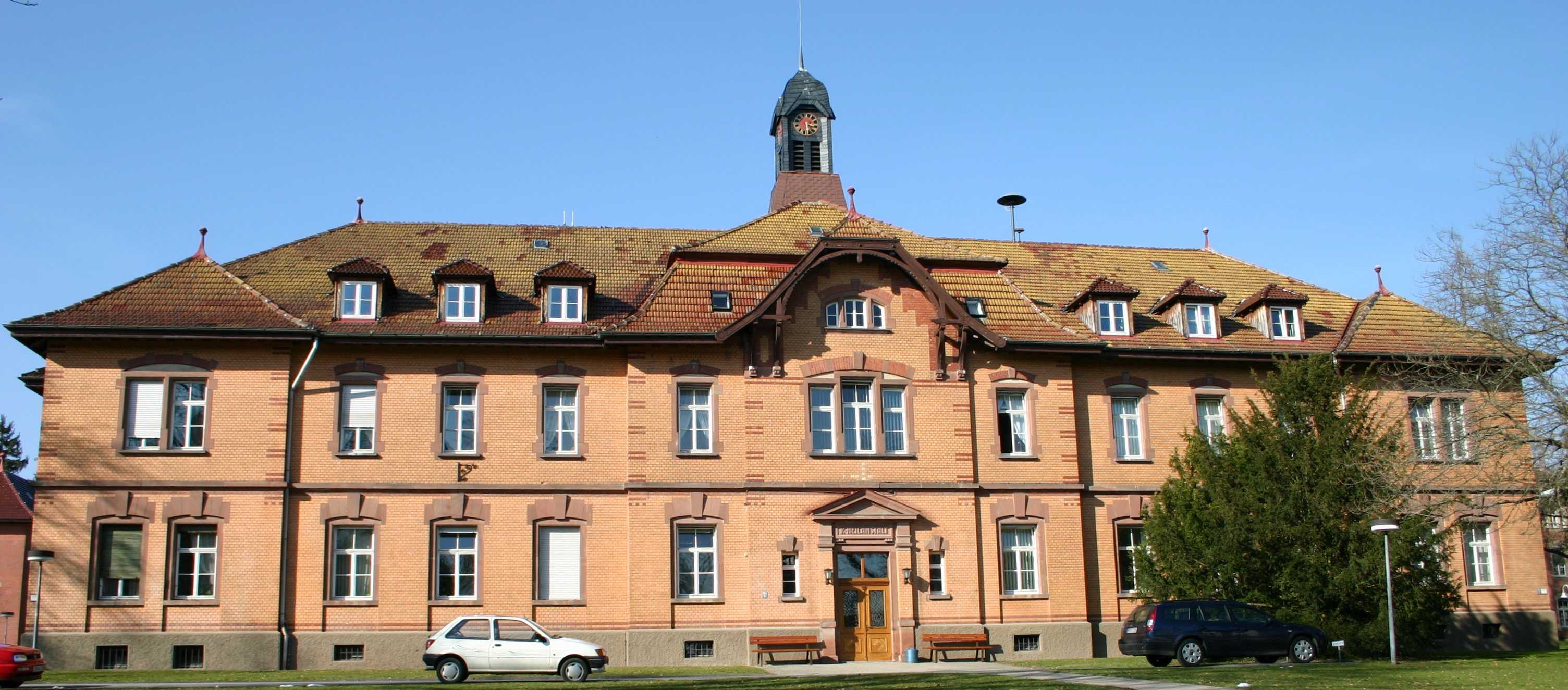
Administration offices

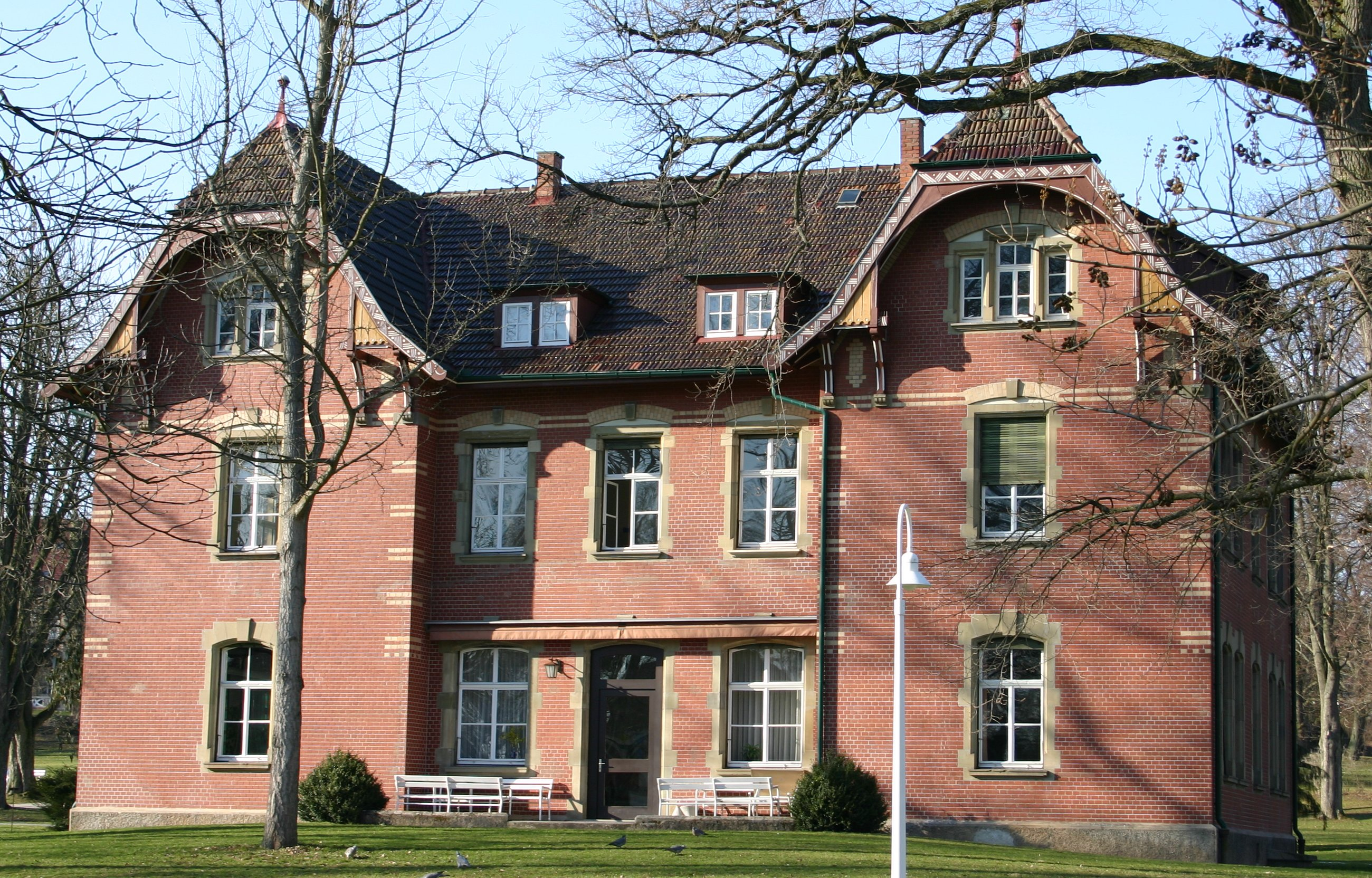
Nursing school

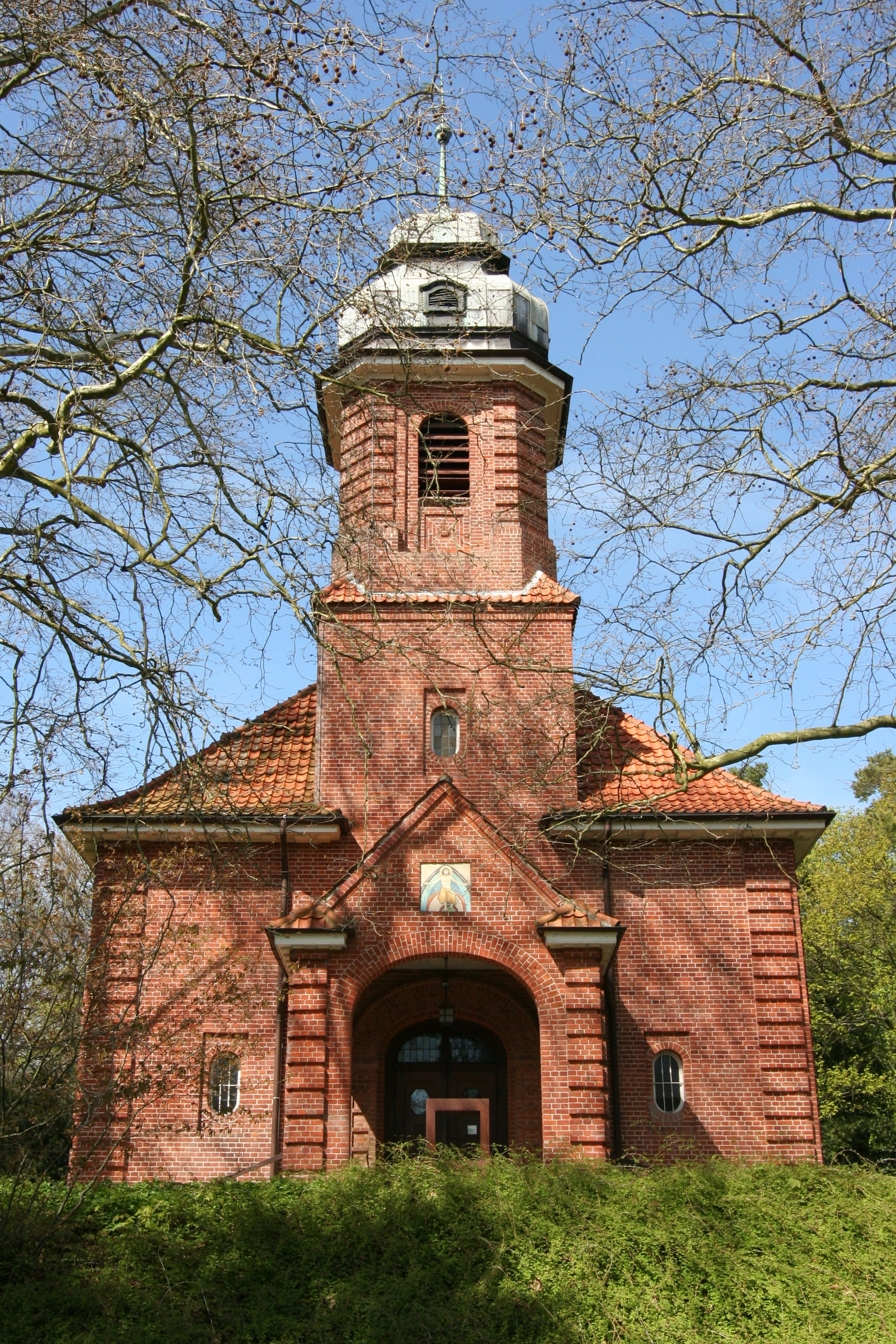
The church

As a federal state operated hospital the psychiatry was called Psychiatrisches Landeskrankenhaus Weinsberg since 1954. Due to a legal reform in 1996 the hospital became a public agency and changed its name to Zentrum für Psychiatrie Weinsberg (psychiatric centre Weinsberg). In 2002 the name was changed again, it is now called Klinikum am Weissenhof (Clinic at the Weissenhof), science the hospital no longer cared for psychiatric patients only. The hospital is a legally independent member of the group ZfP-Gruppe Baden-Württemberg.

Today Klinikum am Weissenhof is a state-of-the-art psychiatric hospital. Its numerous departments are general psychiatry, gerontological psychiatry, forensic psychiatry, pediatry and adolescent psychiatry, as well as addiction therapy and psychotherapeutic medicine. In 522 regular beds 13.000 patients are treated annually. The hospital has approximately 1.100 employees, which makes it the largest employer in the area of Weinsberg. Altogether the 97 hospital buildings are distributed across the area of the 43 ha park. The park has 3.800 trees and the buildings are connected through 10 km of pathways.

The hospital is a teaching hospital for the University of Heidelberg. Additionally patients of high school age have the opportunity to attend a school especially for long term patients. It runs a nursing school in cooperation with the clinic Löwenstein. The school trains nurses and health care professionals. Furthermore, the psychiatric center houses a pharmacy, a garden center which is used for therapy as well, and has an own fire department.
