= Matan =

Matan may refer to:

- Matan, Israel, a settlement in central Israel
- Matan (given name), a Hebrew given name (including a list of people with the name)
- Matan I, 9th-century BC Phoenician king
- Alexandru Mățan, Romanian footballer

== See also ==
- El Matan, Israeli outpost in the West Bank
- Matan Women's Institute for Torah Studies
- Madhan (disambiguation)
- Maton
