= Weinsberg =

- Town
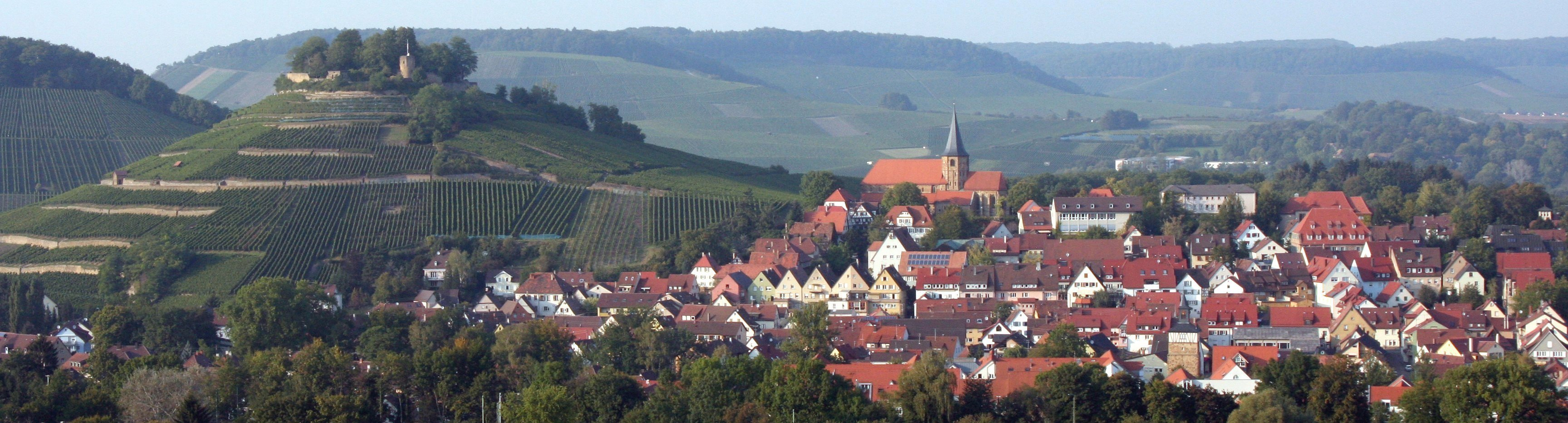

- Coat of arms

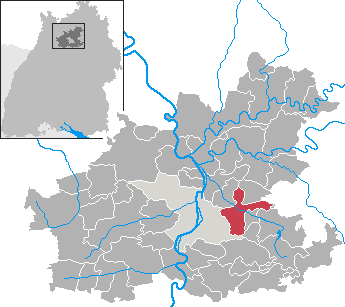
- Location of Weinsberg within Heilbronn district
- Interactive map of Weinsberg
- Location within Germany Location within Baden-Württemberg
- Coordinates: 49°9′6.5″N 9°17′8.5″E
- Country: Germany
- State: Baden-Württemberg
- Admin. region: Stuttgart
- District: Heilbronn
- Municipal assoc.: Raum Weinsberg
- Subdivisions: 4

Government
  - Mayor (2023–31): Birgit Hannemann (CDU)

Area
  - Total: 22.22 km^{2} (8.58 sq mi)
- Elevation: 219 m (719 ft)

Population (2025-12-31)
  - Total: 13,406
  - Density: 603.3/km^{2} (1,563/sq mi)
- Time zone: UTC+01:00 (CET)
  - Summer (DST): UTC+02:00 (CEST)
- Postal codes: 74189
- Dialling codes: 07134
- Vehicle registration: HN
- Website: www.weinsberg.de

Weinsberg (German pronunciation: [ˈvaɪnsbɛʁk]; South Franconian: Weischberg) is a town in the north of the state of Baden-Württemberg in Germany. It was founded around 1200 and is situated in the Heilbronn district. The town has about 13,000 inhabitants. It is noted for its wine.

== Geography ==
=== Geographical position ===
Weinsberg lies in the eastern Heilbronn district in the northeast part of Baden-Wuerttemberg, between the Neckar in the west and the Löwenstein mountains in the east. The small river Sulm rises from the Löwenstein mountains and flows into the Neckar after approximately 20 km (12 mi). The valley formed of the Sulm and its tributaries is called Weinsberger Tal. The city mainly lies in and on the tendencies of the valley of the Stadtseebach (also called Saubach), a southern tributary of the Sulm. The Sulm flows by Weinsberg's area, but not by the city itself, and only a small northern part of the city lies at the edge of the Sulm valley.

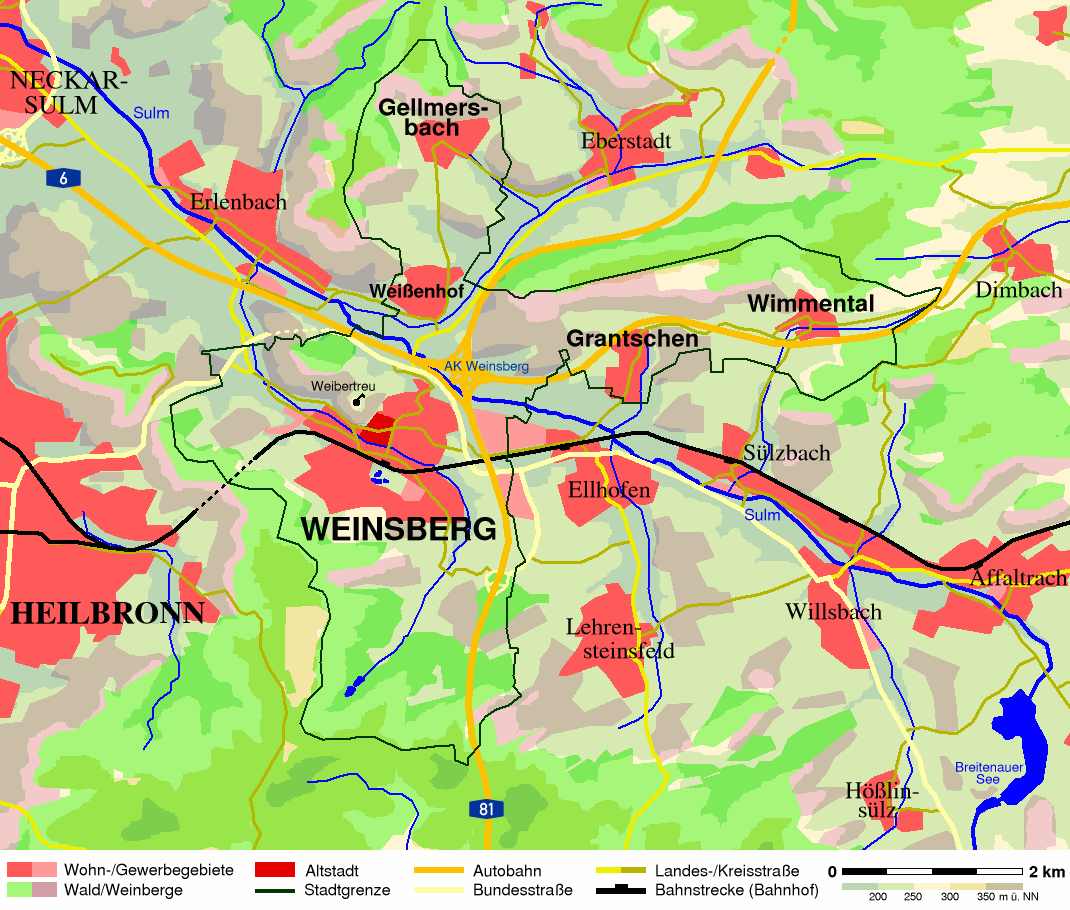
Map of Weinsberg with its parts

Northwest of the town centre rises the Burgberg, with the ruins of Weibertreu castle, west of it the Scheuerberg. Both mountains are used intensively for viticulture. In the east extends the Sulm valley, south the cultivated area are the Stadtseebach valley and the Brühl valley. In the south and the west the city borders on the Heilbronn mountains, which are wooded foothills of the Löwenstein mountains. They begin in the east with the Reisberg and extend over the Hintersberg and the Waldheide up to the Galgenberg and the Wartberg in the west. On the Wartberg the valley of the Stadtseebach continues, north of it the Schemelsberg mentioned above in the northwest.

The Sulm valley in the north of the Schemelsberg becomes dominated by the A 6, which meets the A 81 by the Weinsberg interchange in the north-east of the town. North of the Sulmtal continues the wooded Sulmer Bergebene. The A 81 towards Stuttgart runs approximately along the eastern boundary border of Weinsberg.

The lowest point of the boundary lies at the Sulm with 166 m elevation. The highest point lies on the northern slope of the Reisberg at the southeast boundary border to Heilbronn with 338 m elevation.

=== Geology ===
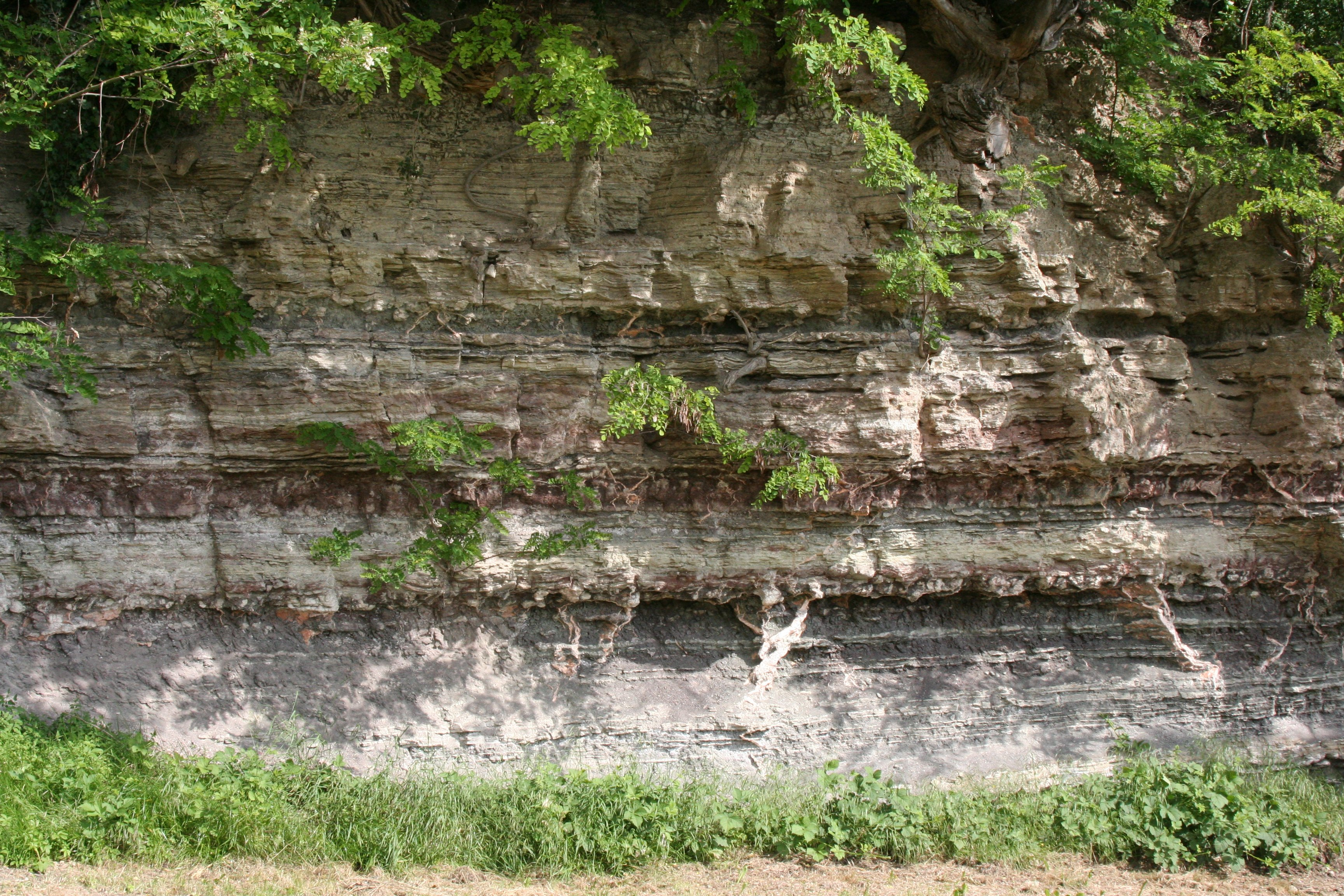
Geological strata at the Burgberg

Weinsberg is situated on the edge of a Keuper area of the Löwenstein mountains, whose foothills extend until Neckarsulm and Öhringen. The Burgberg and Schemelsberg are buttes being separated by Sulm and Stadtseebach from the remaining mountain stick. Both have a stratum of sandstone, which was used both for the Weibertreu castle and the Johanneskirche. At the Burgberg from 1811 to 1867 gypsum was reduced. The hole being left by the gypsum dismantling in the mountain was filled up again in the 1950s and converted into vineyards of the local viticulture school.

In former times in the periphery of Weinsberg 10 quarries were operated. In Weinsberg there were quarries at the southwest border to Heilbronn as well as on the Burgberg (the last one very small).

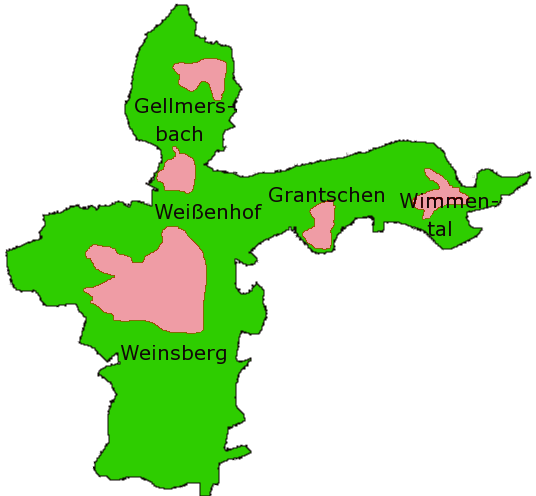

=== Area ===
The town of Weinsberg covers 22.22 km^{2} (8.58 sq mi), about 13.95 km^{2} (5.39 sq mi) of which are allotted to Weinsberg, 3.36 km^{2} (1.30 sq mi) to Gellmersbach, 2.10 km^{2} (0.81 sq mi) to Grantschen and 2.79 km^{2} (1.08 sq mi) to Wimmental (conditions: June 2006).

By the incorporations the form of the communal land can be compared with an irregular (Greek) cross, whereby Weinsberg represents the short west and the thickened south bar. Gellmersbach represents the north bar; Grantschen and Wimmental represent the extended east bar. The expansion in north–south direction amounts to about 8.6 km (5.3 mi), in west–east direction about 9.3 km (5.8 mi). In 1957 as well as 1988-2004 the land use distributed itself as follows: (Area specifications in ha, source 1957: 1988–2004:):

	1957	%	1988	%	1992	%	1996	%	2000	%	2004	%
Total surface	1,429	100.00	2,223	100.0	2,222	100.0	2,222	100.0	2.221	100.0	2,222	100.0
Settlement and traffic surface	155.9	10.90	515	23.2	546	24.6	567	25.5	595	26.8	615	27.7
Agricultural surface	750.9	52.50	1,186	53.4	1,122	50.5	1,100	49.5	1,068	48.1	1,048	47.1
Forest surface	496.1	34.70	494	22.2	529	23.8	529	23.8	528	23.8	528	23.7
Water surface	6.5	0.45	10	0.5	12	0.5	12	0.5	13	0.6	13	0.6
Remaining surface	19.6	1.37	17	0.8	13	0.6	14	0.6	17	0.8	18	0.8

The settlement surface increases continuously, since Weinsberg still proves construction sites. Conversely the agriculturally used surface decreases.

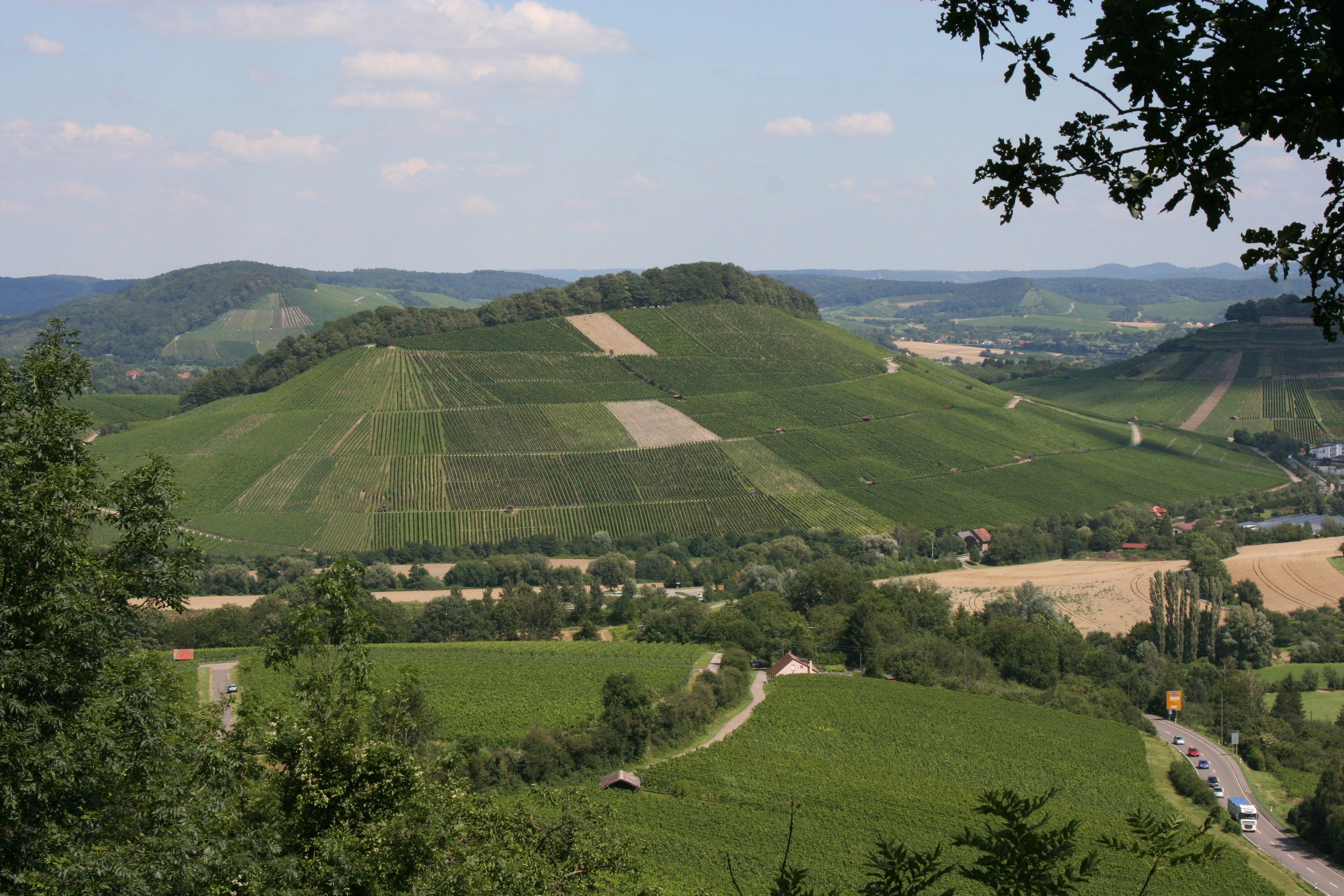
View of the Schemelsberg from Heilbronn's Wartberg. Burgberg on the right.

The urban forest possession amounts to altogether 567 ha. Beside 426 ha forest on the communal land of Weinsberg and its localities the city also possesses 141 ha forest on the communal land of Gemmingen, which was acquired on 29 July 1936, as reconciliation for Weinsberg's area deliveries to the state for military purposes (extension of Heilbronn's drilling place on the Waldheide).

=== Neighbouring municipalities ===
Neighboring municipalities of Weinsberg are (clockwise from the west): the city Heilbronn (Stadtkreis) and the municipalities Erlenbach, Eberstadt, Bretzfeld (Hohenlohekreis), Obersulm, Ellhofen and Lehrensteinsfeld. With the exception of Heilbronn and Bretzfeld all belong to the district of Heilbronn. Together with Eberstadt, Ellhofen and Lehrensteinsfeld Weinsberg has combined to form a joint association of administrations called "Raum Weinsberg" seated in Weinsberg.

Part	Incorporation	Inhabitants	Surface
Weinsberg	–	9818	13.94 km^{2}
Gellmersbach	January 1, 1975	1038	3.36 km^{2}
Grantschen	January 1, 1973	822	2.10 km^{2}
Wimmental	January 1, 1975	659	2.80 km^{2}

=== Town structure ===
Except from the town itself, Weinsberg consists of the incorporated localities of Gellmersbach, Grantschen and Wimmental. Outside of the closed land development are the places Weißenhof (with clinical center), Rappenhof and Stöcklesberg belonging to Weinsberg, without it dealing thereby with own localities. Gone off no longer existing places on Weinsberg's communal land are Bodelshofen, Burkhardswiesen (or Burchardeswiesen), Holßhofen, In dem Gründe, Lyndach, Uff the Wier and Wolfshöfle.

=== Climate ===
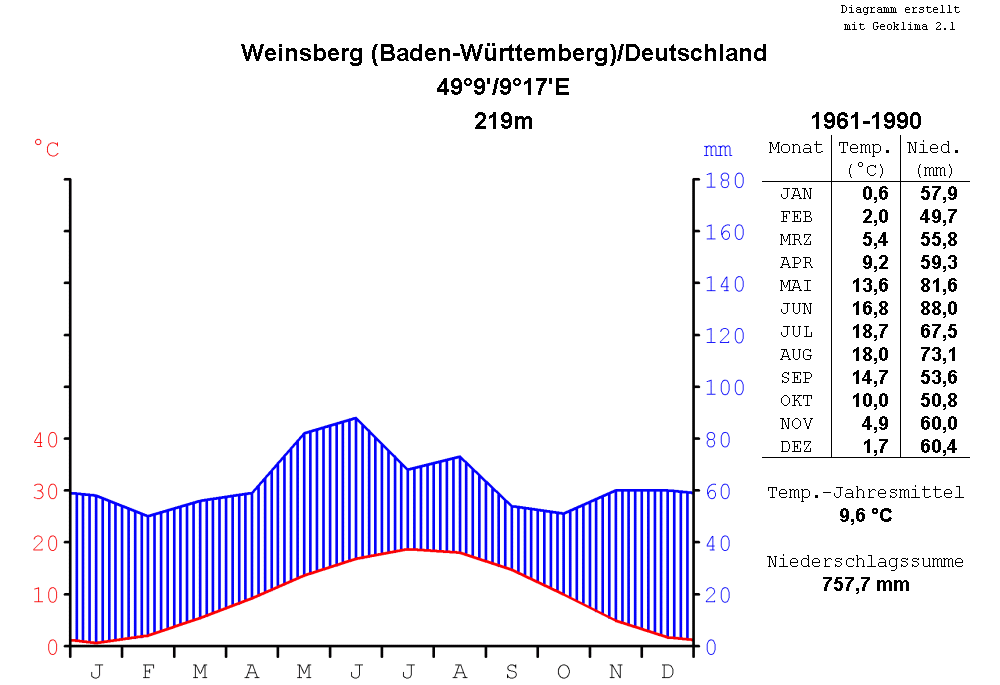
climatic diagram of Weinsberg

The climate is mostly mild by the protected valley situation and favours the extensively operated viticulture. The annual average duration of sunshine amounts on 1638.7 hours.

According to annual reports of the viticulture school Weinsberg, the average yearly temperature during 1961-1990 was 9.6 °C (49.3 °F), the annual precipitation was about 740 mm (29.1 in). Values for the period 1971-2000 are 738.4 mm (29.1 in) at 10.0 °C (50.0 °F) and 2002 11.1 °C (52.0 °F) at 959 mm (37.8 in). January from 1961 to 1990 had on the average 0.6 °C (33.1 °F) at 57 mm (2.2 in) precipitation, 1971-2000 1.4 °C (34.5 °F) at 51.7 mm (2.0 in) and 2002 0.8 °C (33.4 °F) at 21 mm (0.8 in). July had from 1961 to 1990 on the average 18.7 °C (65.7 °F) at 65 mm (2.6 in) precipitation, 1971-2000 19.2 °C (66.6 °F) at 74.5 mm (2.9 in) and 2002 18.8 °C (65.8 °F) at 92 mm (3.6 in).

According to meteorological data of the viticulture school the average yearly temperature in Weinsberg increased from 1900 to 2006 from 9.2 °C (49 °F) to 10 °C (50 °F).

== History ==
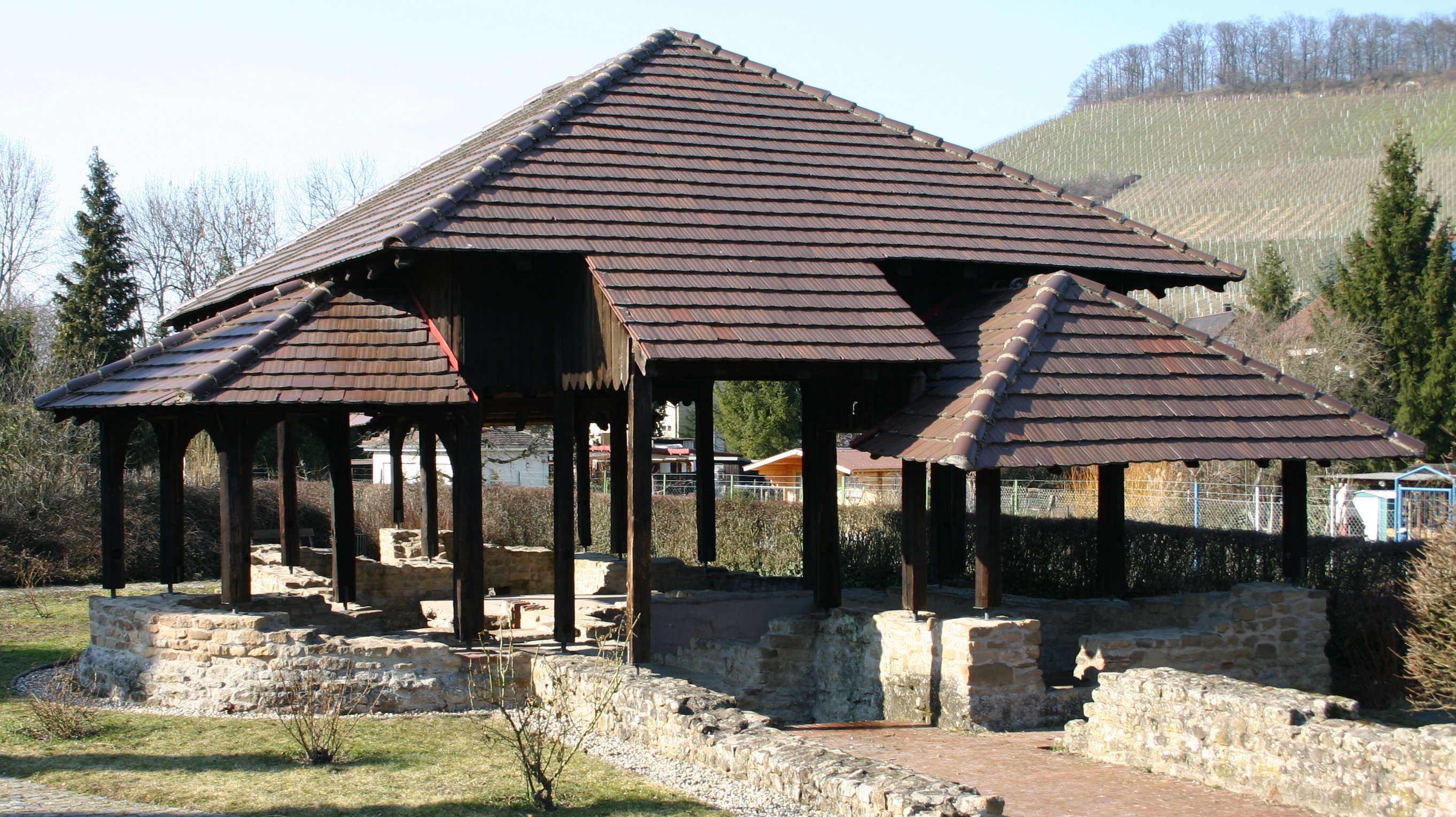
The Römerbad ("Roman bath") - shelter of the 20th century

=== Prehistory and antiquity ===
The earliest known settlement trace in Weinsberg is a group of tumuli. They're situated in the forest near the boundary to Heilbronn and haven't been investigated so far. It is assumed that the tumuli are to be assigned to the Hallstatt culture.

In the 19th century there was found a Celtic silver coin from the 2nd century BC. Its inscription "V, O, L, C" can be assigned to the Celtic tribe of the Volcae, which lived (among other places) in Southern Germany at that time. So it can be assumed that Celts lived at least occasionally in the area of today's Weinsberg.

However, the first solidly attested settlers in the area of Weinsberg were the Romans. In the 2nd century, a Roman road led through today's town, running from the Böckingen castellet (belonging to the Neckar Limes) to the Öhringen castellet (belonging to the Limes Germanicus). Between 148 and 161 AD, a Roman villa rustica was established on this road, which existed until its destruction by the Alamanni in 234 or 259/260. The bath house of this manor (known in Weinsberg as Römerbad, i.e. "Roman bath") was excavated and conserved in 1906; parts of the remaining manor followed in 1977.

=== Middle Ages ===
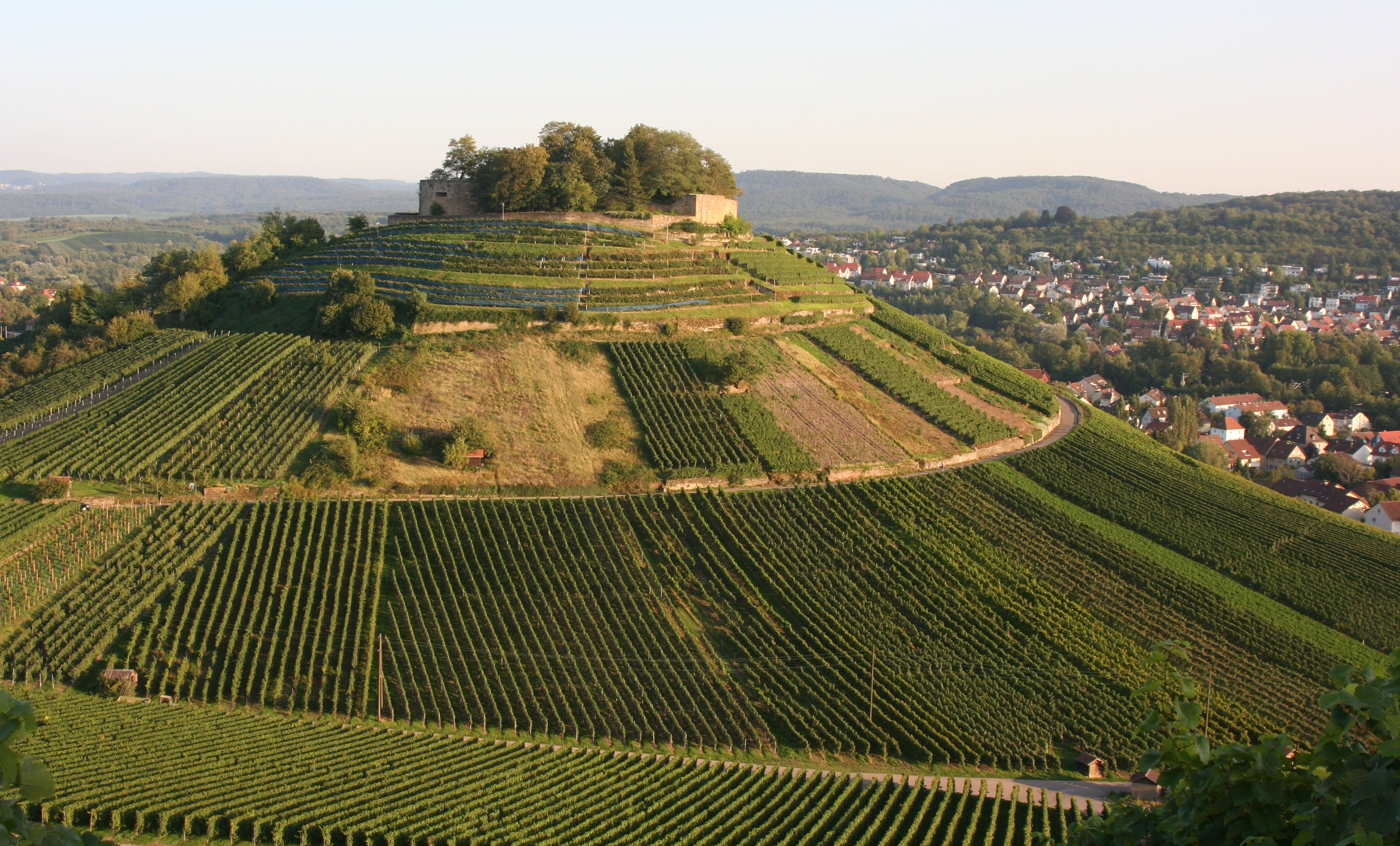
The Burgberg with the castle ruin from west

Around 500 AD, the Alamanni were displaced by the Franks, who settled on Weinsberg's communal land between Erlenbach and Gellmersbach in the 7th century. In 778 the area around Weinsberg was first mentioned as "Sulmanachgowe" in a deed of donation of Charlemagne to the Lorsch Abbey. In the area of today's Weinsberg several medieval settlements (Bodelshofen, Burchardeswiesen, Lyndach) were established, continuing even after the town foundation, but finally given up.

Presumably around 1000, the Weinsberg castle was established on a mountain at the trade route running from Heilbronn to Schwäbisch Hall.

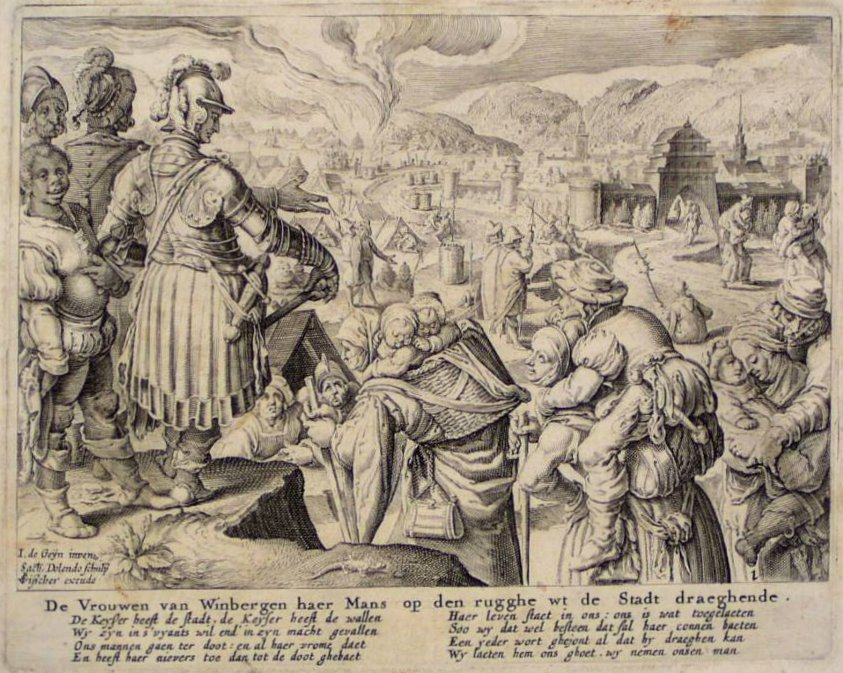
An artist's representation of the siege of Weinsberg and the loyal women 1140. Copper engraving by Zacharias Dolendo, 16th century.

In 1140 the castle was besieged by Konrad III in the course of the struggles between the Staufers and the Welfs. Finally it had to surrender on December 21, 1140, since the relief army of Welf VI had been defeated by the Staufers in a battle. According to the report of the Chronica regia Coloniensis, the women of the castle were granted free departure and allowed to take what they could carry on their backs. They carried down their men, and so saved their lives, since the king adhered to his word. The women became known as treue Weiber ("loyal wives"). The castle (today's ruin) is called Weibertreu due to this occurrence.

The Staufers used a family of ministerialis from Gmünd as managers of the castle, which soon called itself after its seat "von Weinsberg" (Masters of Weinsberg) and who possessed the castle as a fiefdom until 1450. A settlement developed at the tendencies of the Burgberg. A settlement at the trade route in the valley served the supply of the castle and the surrounding localities. Around 1200 the building of the Johanneskirche began at instigation of the Masters of Weinsberg between these two settlements.

Presumably Weinsberg was created at the same time and surrounded with a city wall. In 1241 the town was first mentioned in one Staufish income list, where Weinsberg ranked at 29 equal with Donauwörth, Wiesbaden, Offenburg and Konstanz. The date of when Weinsberg attained its town privileges is unknown. However, it must have been before 1283, since Rudolf I had lent its town privileges to Löwenstein in this year – after the model of the city right, which its predecessors of the town Weinsberg had lent. At the beginning one half of Weinsberg was a free imperial city, the other half belonged to the Masters of Weinsberg. The town persisted on its status as a free imperial city and affirmed it by entering different city federations, what led to numerous quarrels between the town and the masters.

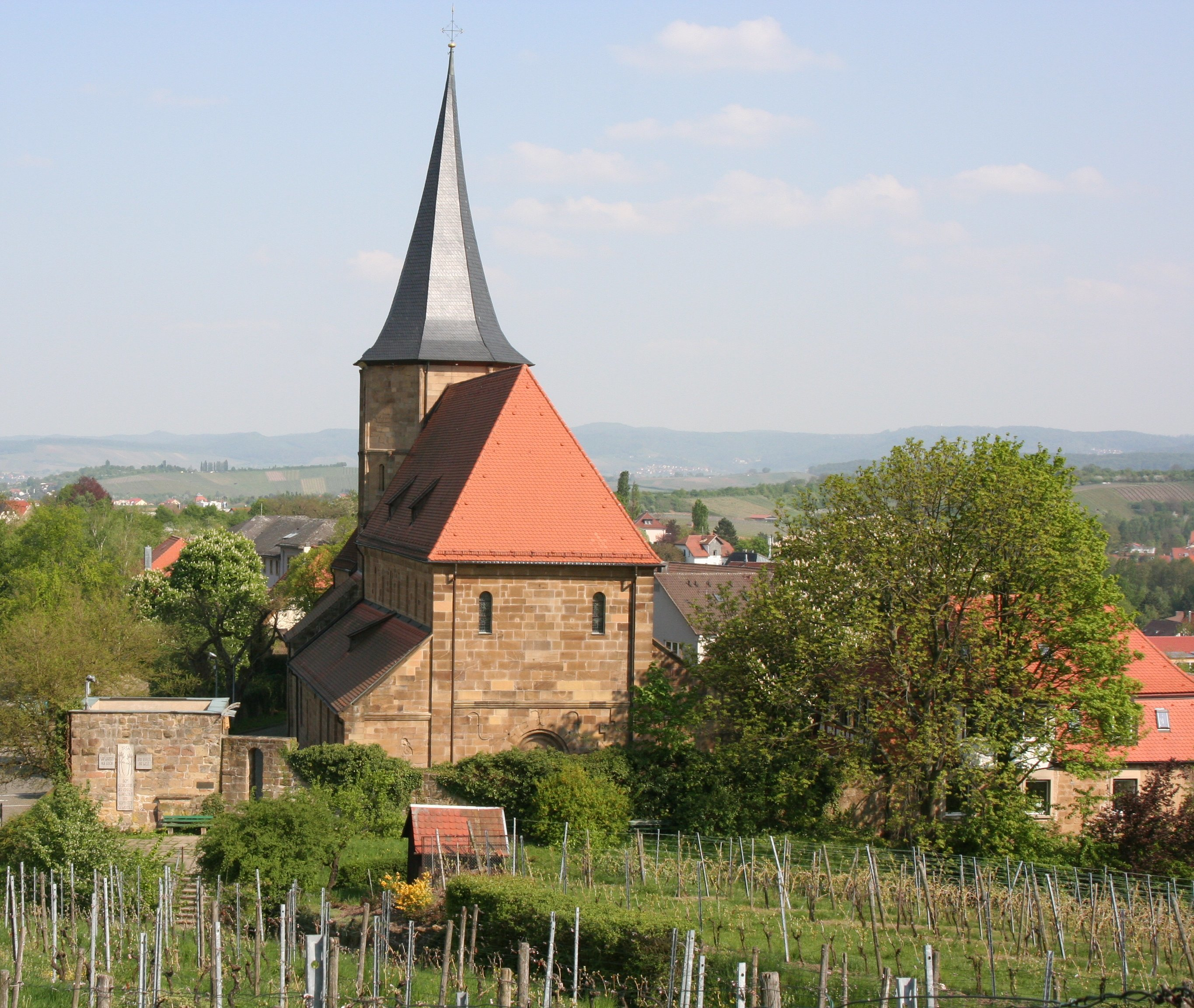
The northwest corner of the old part of town with Johanneskirche and remainders of the city wall

The city wall around the town established in early 13th century originally also included the castle in the northwest by linking walls. In the area between these linking walls, directly underneath the castle, there were houses for priests, ministerialis and serfs of the masters. Presumably in 1332 Weinsberg's citizens destroyed this quarter and locked the city in the west in opposite to the castle, as documents state from 1375. While two of the three castle masters were absent and against the resistance of the third one they established a wall between castle and town with a moat. Probably the linking walls were broken off at the same time.

The quarrels with the masters persisted. Finally, on May 22, 1417, Sigismund gave Weinsberg to his treasurer Konrad IX. So the town had been devalued by losing its status as a free imperial city to the subordinated status of the Masters of Weinsberg's rule. The town looked for protection in a further city federation called the Weinsberg Federation. On November 27, 1420, 33 free imperial cities united for the protection of Weinsberg.

The town refused to acknowledge Konrad's rule and did not want to pay its taxes any longer. That is why Konrad IX achieved the Reichsacht at the royal court imposing on all citizens of age on 10 February 1422. Since it had caused nothing the Aberacht followed in 1425. In addition the Pope – presumably Martin V – imposed the anathema on them in 1424. However, all this had not caused anything, and Konrad took drastic steps. Weakening the Swabian towns allied with Weinsberg, he acquired the town Sinsheim, where one of the arteries led to the Frankfurt Trade Fair. In August 1428 he attacked businessmen in Sinsheim travelling to the fair and detained 149 people from 20 cities, so the Frankfurt fair had to fail. The king took it as a personal offense and withdrew his favour from Konrad. In October 1428 the cities agreed with Konrad in Heidelberg, however the king forbade this agreement. Two years later, the parties reached an agreement on the basis of the obtained agreement two years before. According to the corresponding treaty Konrad had to recognize Weinsberg as a (undivided) free imperial city.

=== 16th until 19th century ===
The German religious reformer Johannes Oecolampadius was born here in 1482 and was a preacher at the local church from 1510 to 1518, the year in which he went to Basel, where he introduced the reformation.

On April 16, 1525 (Easter Sunday), during the German Peasants' War, the peasants attacked and destroyed the castle, which was already damaged from an earlier attack in 1504. They then proceeded to execute the nobleman who had been in command of both town and castle and who had treated the peasants very badly several times before. The execution was an unprecedented move and shocked and outraged the German nobility and clergy. They had the town destroyed several weeks later, on May 21, even though the townspeople had had nothing to do with the execution.

From 1819 until his death in 1862, the poet and physician Justinus Kerner lived in Weinsberg. His circle of friends, all of them poets, often met at his house, giving Weinsberg the reputation of being a "Swabian Weimar".

=== World War II ===
During the Second World War, Weinsberg was the site of a prison camp (Oflag Va) for Allied officers (French and British Commonwealth). One famous prisoner was Charles Hazlitt Upham. On April 12, 1945, the town was largely destroyed by aerial bombings, gunfire and fires.

== Politics ==
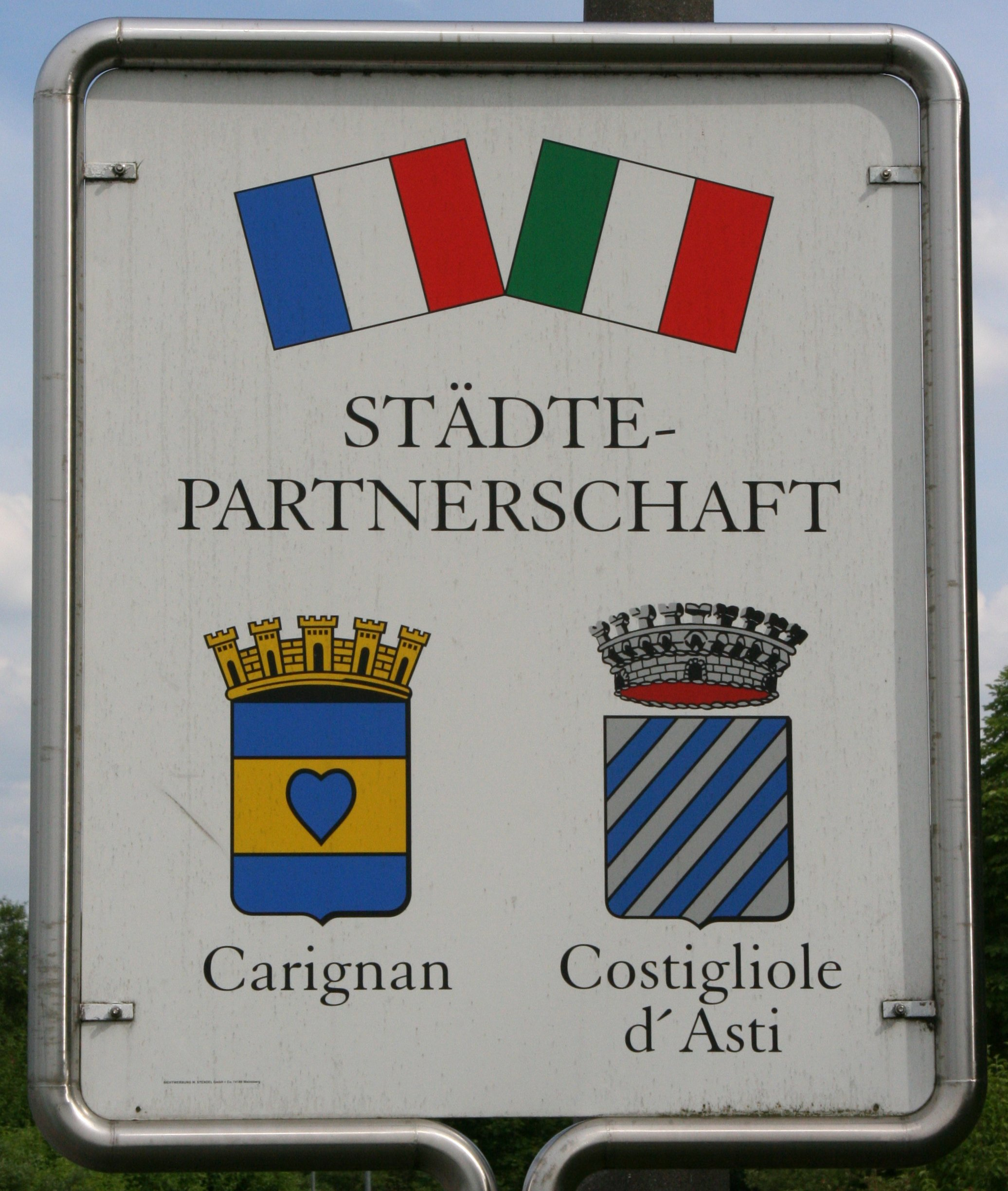
Coats of arms of Weinsberg's twin towns Carignan (France) and Costigliole d'Asti (Italy)

=== Twin Towns ===
Weinsberg has official partnerships with the French town of Carignan (département Ardennes) and the Italian town of Costigliole d'Asti (Province of Asti). There are informal relations with Cossebaude (now a part of Dresden) in Germany, Keyworth (Nottinghamshire) in the UK and Lake Crystal, Minnesota, in the US. The latter two came about because of student exchange programs between schools in Weinsberg and schools there.

The American town of Winesburg, Ohio, was originally named after Weinsberg in the early 19th century and had the spelling changed only in 1833.

=== Mayors ===
Before 1930 the title was Schultheiß/Stadtschultheiß

- 1820-1845 Heinrich Pfaff
- 1845-1853: Franz Fraas
- 1853-1862: Johann Jakob Haug,
- 1862-1875: Johann Franz Käpplinger,
- 1875-1914: Carl Seufferheld
- 1914-1924: Adolf Strehles
- 1924-1945: Karl Weinbrenner
- 1945 Ludwig Mayer
- 1945 Rudolf Ilg
- 1946-1948: Gustav Zimmermann
- 1948-1972 Erwin Heim
- 1972-1996: Jürgen Klatte
- 1996-2004: Walter Kuhn
- since 2004: Stefan Thoma

== Economy and infrastructure ==
=== Wine growing ===
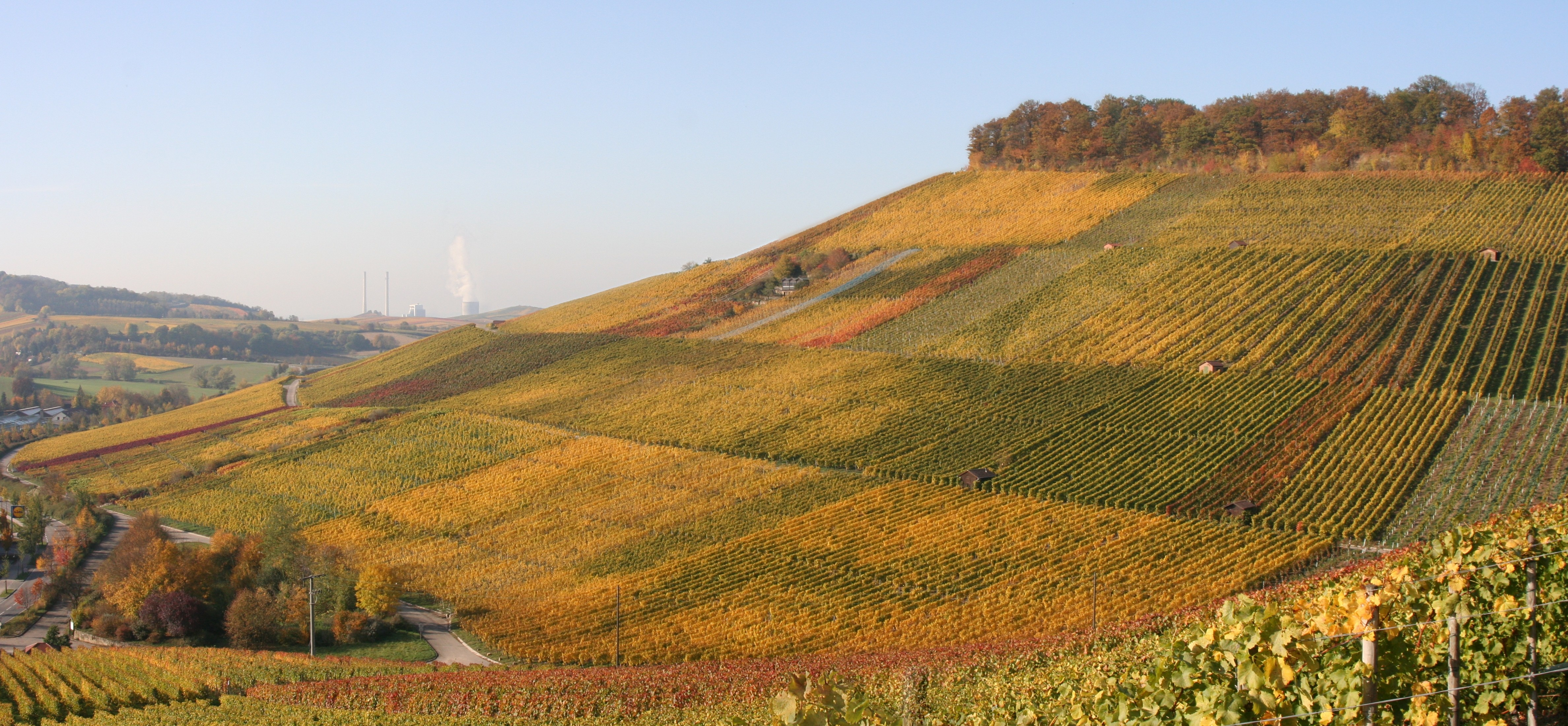
Autumnal wineyards on the Schemelsberg, seen from the Burgberg

In earlier times viticulture has been the basis of Weinsberg's economy and plays still an important role. In 1271 viticulture in Weinsberg was mentioned for the first time, there are proven 28 wine presses in the town from 1636. With a cultivated area of 430 ha (conditions: 2005, with districts), two thirds of it are red wine sorts, standing the town in fifth place of the viticulture municipalities in Württemberg. In 1868 the winemaking cooperative Weinsberg was created, getting combined with Erlenbach's and Heilbronn's cooperatives to the Genossenschaftskellerei Heilbronn-Erlenbach-Weinsberg e. G., still attaching the most wine-growers of Weinsberg. In addition there are some estates removing and marketing their wine by themselves. Besides there's the Staatliche Lehr- und Versuchsanstalt für Wein- und Obstbau Weinsberg (LVWO or briefly viticulture school) created in 1868, educating people and marketing their wine as Staatsweingut Weinsberg. Since January 19, 1957, there is also the technical school of cooper business providing courses each year to a mastership examination in this profession. Finally since 1972 also the viticulture association of Württemberg has resided in Weinsberg.

=== Traffic ===
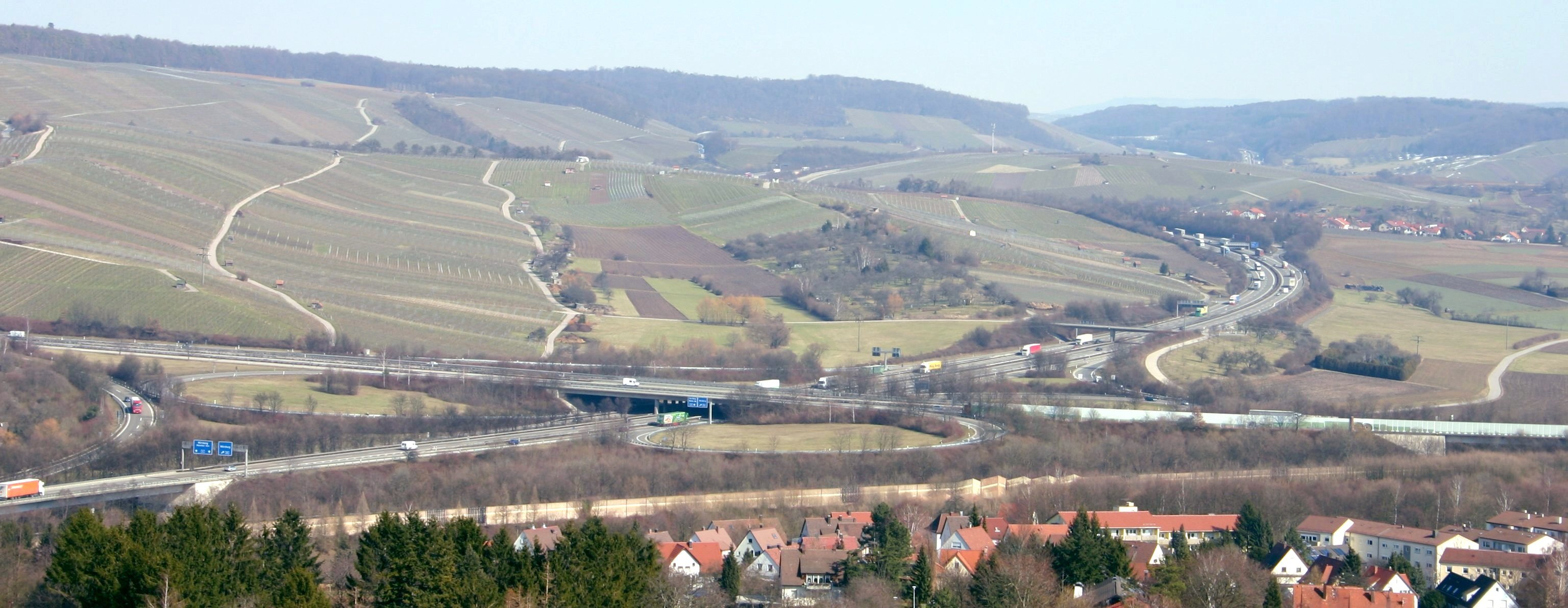
Weinsberg interchange, seen from the Weibertreu castle ruin

In 1966, a motorway interchange was built in the area of Weinsberg and named after the town. The A 6 (Mannheim–Nuremberg) and A 81 (Würzburg–Stuttgart) cross there. The A 81 to Würzburg is less busy than the other three directions. Due to the opening of the Eastern Bloc, the A 6 leading in east–west direction is often a gridlock. In 2001, the daily traffic volume reached 102,000 vehicles. 30% of it are HGV, so it is one of the highest portions in the German motorway net. For a long time, the extension to six lanes of the four-lane A 6 is an urgent desire of the whole Heilbronn region. It has paid the costs of the expansion plan from Weinsberg interchange up to the Bavarian border. The extension is assured but not scheduled yet, so as a remedy the shoulders of the motorway became provisional driving strips.

Formerly the Bundesstraße 39 (Heilbronn–Schwäbisch Hall) leading in west–east direction had been running right through the town, dividing Weinsberg into a northern and southern part. Crossing the B 39 apart from traffic lights was nearly impossible, so the desire of a bypass grew, which was finally inaugurated on July 13, 1990. Running from Heilbronn it passes the Schemelsberg in a tunnel, then it leads around Weinsberg parallel to the A 6 and finally meets the old B 39 in the east. The old route of the B 39 through the town received less traffic. At the border to Ellhofen the motorway feeder B 39a branches to the south, which leads to the A 81's motorway junction Weinsberg/Ellhofen.

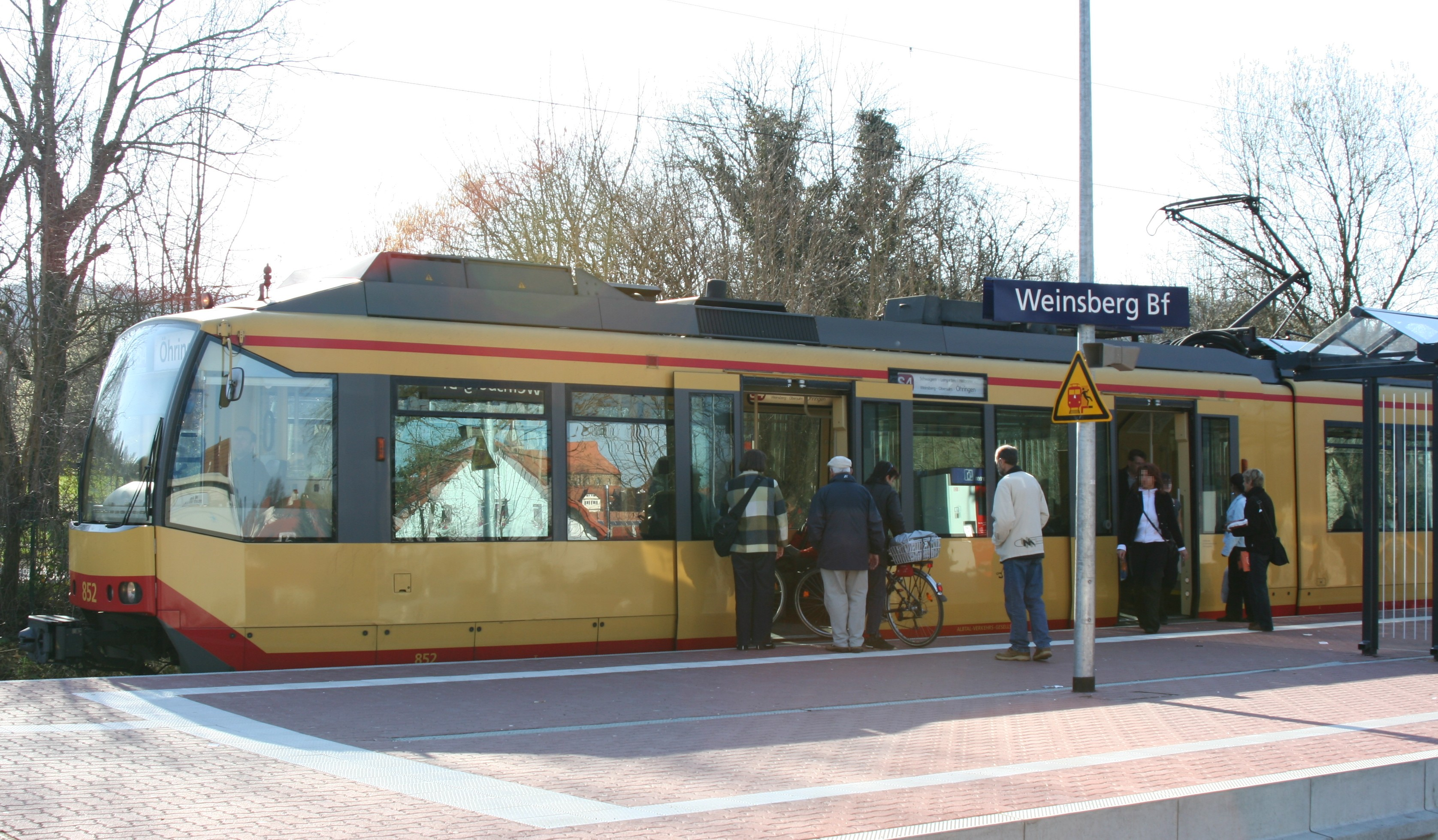
A tram-train at Weinsberg Station

Public transport is provided by tram-trains operated by the Heilbronn and Karlsruhe Stadtbahns and buses co-ordinated with it by the HNV. Weinsberg is situated on the Hohenlohebahn rail track built from 1860 to 1862 running from Heilbronn via Öhringen to Schwäbisch Hall. Apart from Regional-Express trains of the Deutsche Bahn, the Albtal-Verkehrs-Gesellschaft runs its tram-trains there to Öhringen since December 2005. Nothing had been invested to this previous non-electrified distance for a long time, still being on technical conditions of 1900. For this purpose the track became modernized until Öhringen from 2003 to 2005 providing an overhead line for the first time. In addition new train stops were opened. In Weinsberg they're called Weinsberg-West (planned start February 2009) and Weinsberg/Ellhofen Industriegebiet (since December 2006), so that Weinsberg will have three stops at its disposal.

=== Public institutions ===
Weinsberg has a big psychiatric and neurological hospital, founded in 1903. Named "Klinikum am Weissenhof" (since 2002), it is the town's biggest employer. There also is a state institution for teaching and research in winemaking, called the Staatliche Lehr- und Versuchsanstalt für Wein- und Obstbau. Several new grape varieties were bred there since it was founded in 1868.

== Sons and daughters of the town ==
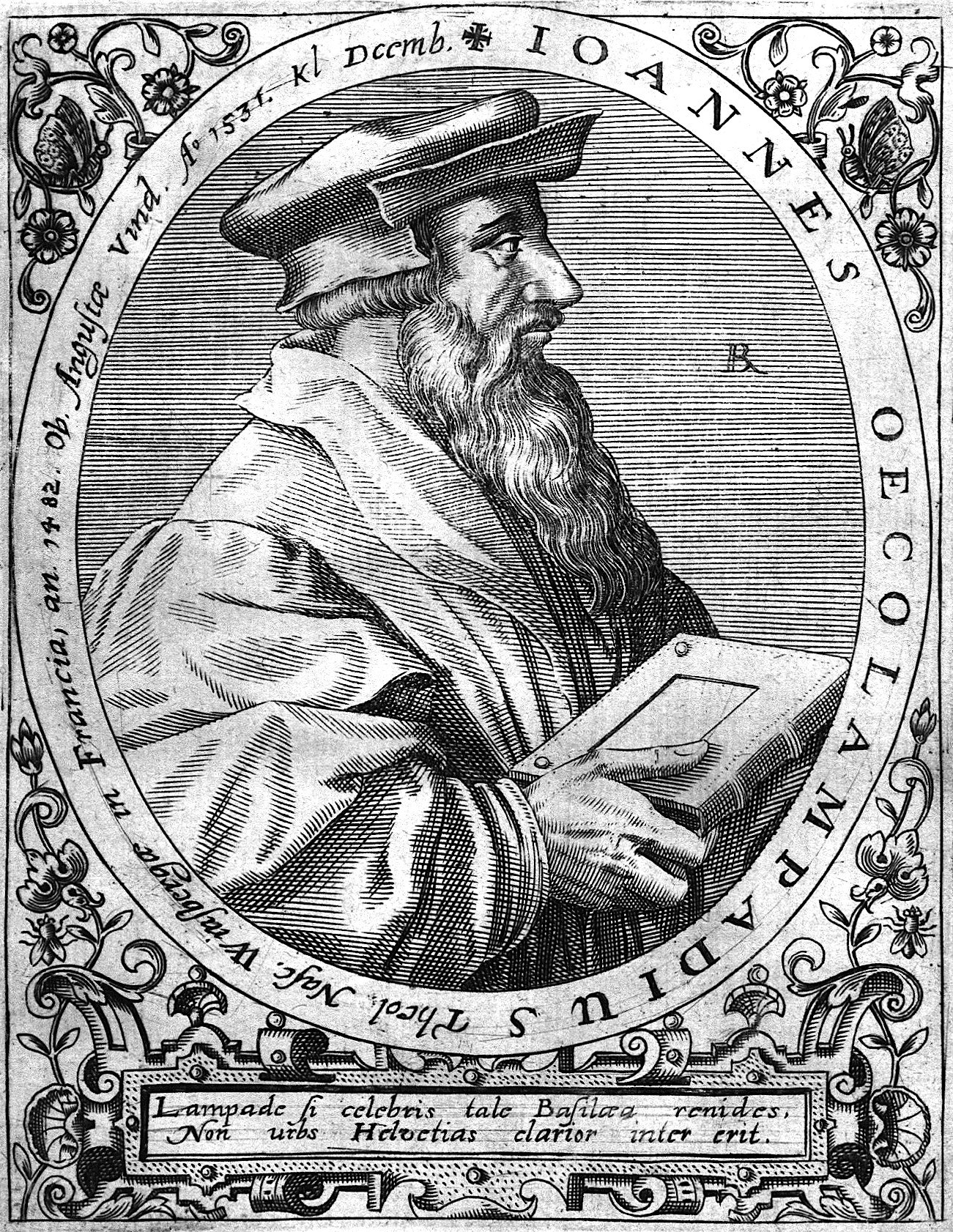
Johannes Oekolampadius

- Hans Schweiner (c. 1473 – 1534), builder, builder of the western tower of the Heilbronner Kilianskirche
- Johannes Oekolampadius (1482–1531), theologian, reformer of Basel
- Carl Krayl (1890–1947), architect
