= Chiers =

River in Luxembourg, Belgium and France

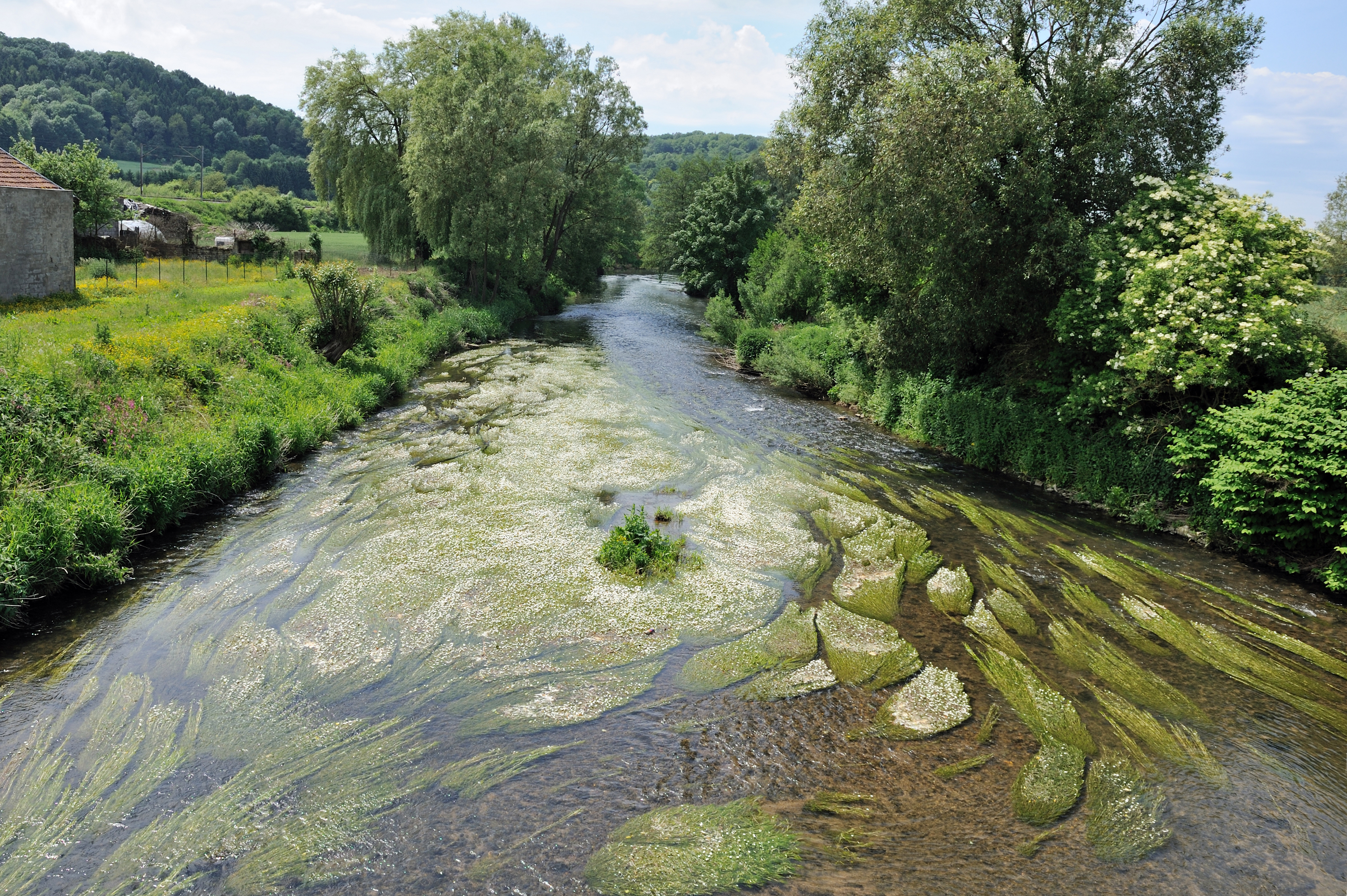
- The Chiers at Charency-Vezin

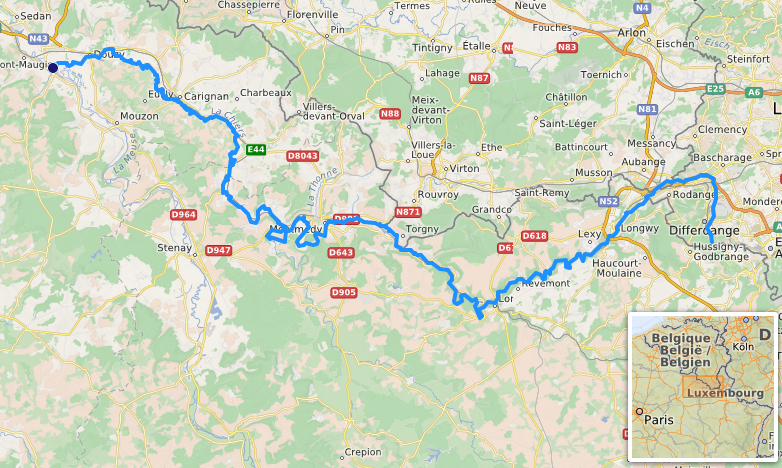

Location
- Countries: France; Belgium; Luxembourg

Physical characteristics
- Source
  - location: Near Differdange, Luxembourg
  - elevation: ±350 m (1,150 ft)
- Mouth
  - location: Meuse
  - coordinates: 49°39′30″N 4°59′40″E
- Length: ±140 km (87 mi)
- Basin size: 2,222 km^{2} (858 mi^{2})

Basin features
- Progression: Meuse→ North Sea

The Chiers (French pronunciation: [ʃjɛʁ]; Luxembourgish: Kuer [kuːɐ̯]; German: Korn [kɔʁn]) is a river in Luxembourg, Belgium and France. It is a right tributary of the Meuse. The total length of the Chiers is approximately 140 kilometres (87 mi), of which 127 km (79 mi) in France.

The source of the Chiers is near Differdange, in Luxembourg. The Chiers flows roughly in a westerly direction, and crosses the border with Belgium and flows through Athus (province of Luxembourg).

It then crosses the border with France, flows through Longwy and Longuyon (Meurthe-et-Moselle) and forms the border with Belgium for a few kilometres near Torgny (in the municipality of Rouvroy). It continues through France, along Montmédy (Meuse) and Carignan (Ardennes).

The Chiers flows into the Meuse at Bazeilles, near Sedan.

The main tributaries of the Chiers are the Loison and the Othain, along with smaller tributaries like the Aulnois.
