= Zacharias Dolendo =

Dutch engraver

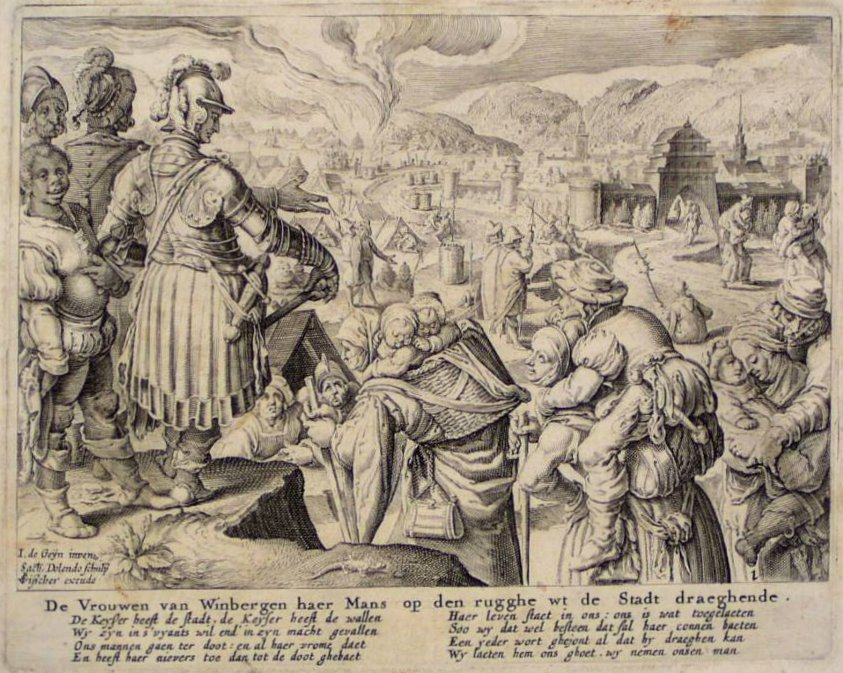
Engraving by Dolendo depicting the story of the "Women of Weinsberg", after a painting by Jacob de Gheyn II

Zacharias Dolendo (1561–1601) was a Dutch engraver. He was the brother of Bartholomeus Dolendo, whom he surpassed both in style and in correctness.

He was born at Leyden in 1561, and is said by Huber to have been a disciple of Jacob De Ghein. There are some portraits by this master, which are not inferior in neatness to those by J. Wierix; his plates are frequently marked with a cipher. There are by him:

- William, Prince of Orange; half-length, in armour. 1581.
- Andromeda chained to the Rock; finely drawn; after his own design.
- Adam and Eve embracing, whilst Eve receives the Apple from the Serpent; after B. Spranger.
- St. Martin dividing his Cloak with two Beggars; after the same.
- The Continence of Scipio; after A. Bloemaert.
- The Virgin and Infant, with two Angels; after J. De Ghein.
- The Crucifixion; after the same.
- A Set of small Plates of the Gods and Goddesses; copied from the larger ones by H. Goltzius.

He died in 1601.
