= Siege of Weinsberg =

1140 battle between the Welfs and Hohenstaufens dynasties

Coordinates: 49.1550°N 9.2830°E

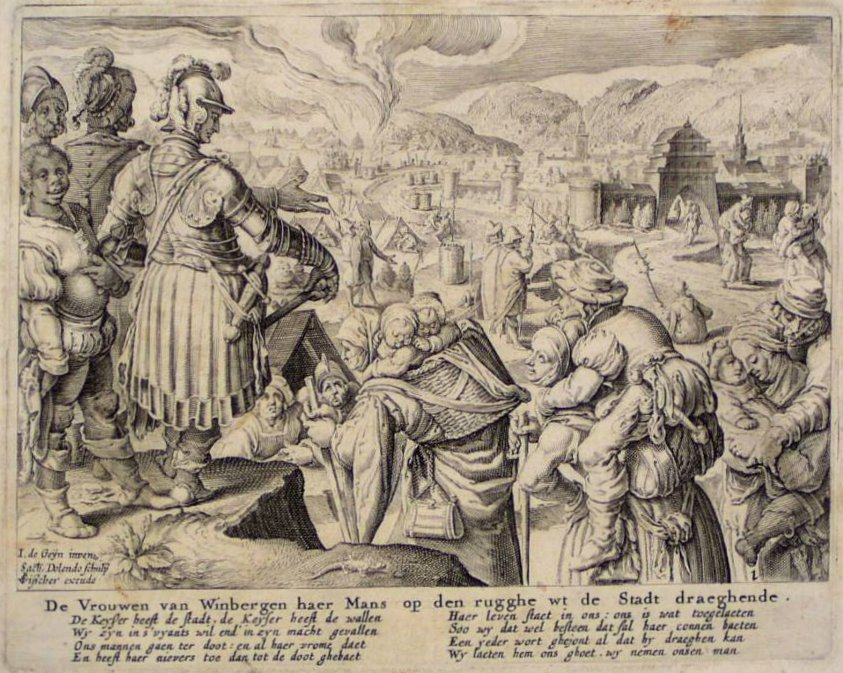
- 16th-century depiction of the "loyal wives" episode
Date	21 December 1140
Location	Weinsberg, Württemberg
Result	Raised peacefully in December; Settlement, imposed at the Diet of Frankfurt of 1142

Belligerents
House of Hohenstaufen	House of Welf

Commanders and leaders
Conrad III of Germany	Welf VI

The siege of Weinsberg took place in 1140 in Weinsberg, in the modern state of Baden-Württemberg, Germany, which was then part of the Holy Roman Empire. The siege was a decisive battle between two dynasties, the Welfs and the Hohenstaufen. The Welfs for the first time changed their war cry from "Kyrie Eleison" to their party cries. The Hohenstaufen used the 'Strike for Gibbelins' war cry.

On the death of the Holy Roman Emperor Lothair III (or II) in 1137, Henry the Proud was the Welf heir of the patrimony of his deceased father-in-law, and possessor of the crown jewels. He stood as a candidate for emperor, but the local princes opposed him and elected Conrad III, a Hohenstaufen, in Frankfurt on 2 February 1138. When Conrad gave the Duchy of Saxony to Count Albert the Bear, the Saxons rose in defence of their young prince, and Count Welf of Altorf, the brother of Henry the Proud, began the war.

Exasperated at the heroic defence of Welfs, Conrad III had resolved to destroy Weinsberg and imprison its defenders. However he suspended the final assault after a surrender was negotiated.

== Legend ==
According to the Latin chronicle Chronica regia Coloniensis, first compiled in the 1170s, these terms granted the women of the city the right to leave with whatever they could carry:

The year of our Lord 1140. The king [Conrad] besieged the city of the duke Welf of Bavaria, which was called Weinsberg, and accepted its surrender, having granted with royal magnanimity permission to the wives and other women found there that they might take with them whatever they could carry on their shoulders. Taking thought both for their loyalty for their husbands and the safety of the others, they disregarded their household goods and came down carrying the men on their shoulders. When Duke Friedrich said that such things should not happen, the king, showing favour to the women's cunning, said that it would not be fitting to change his royal word.

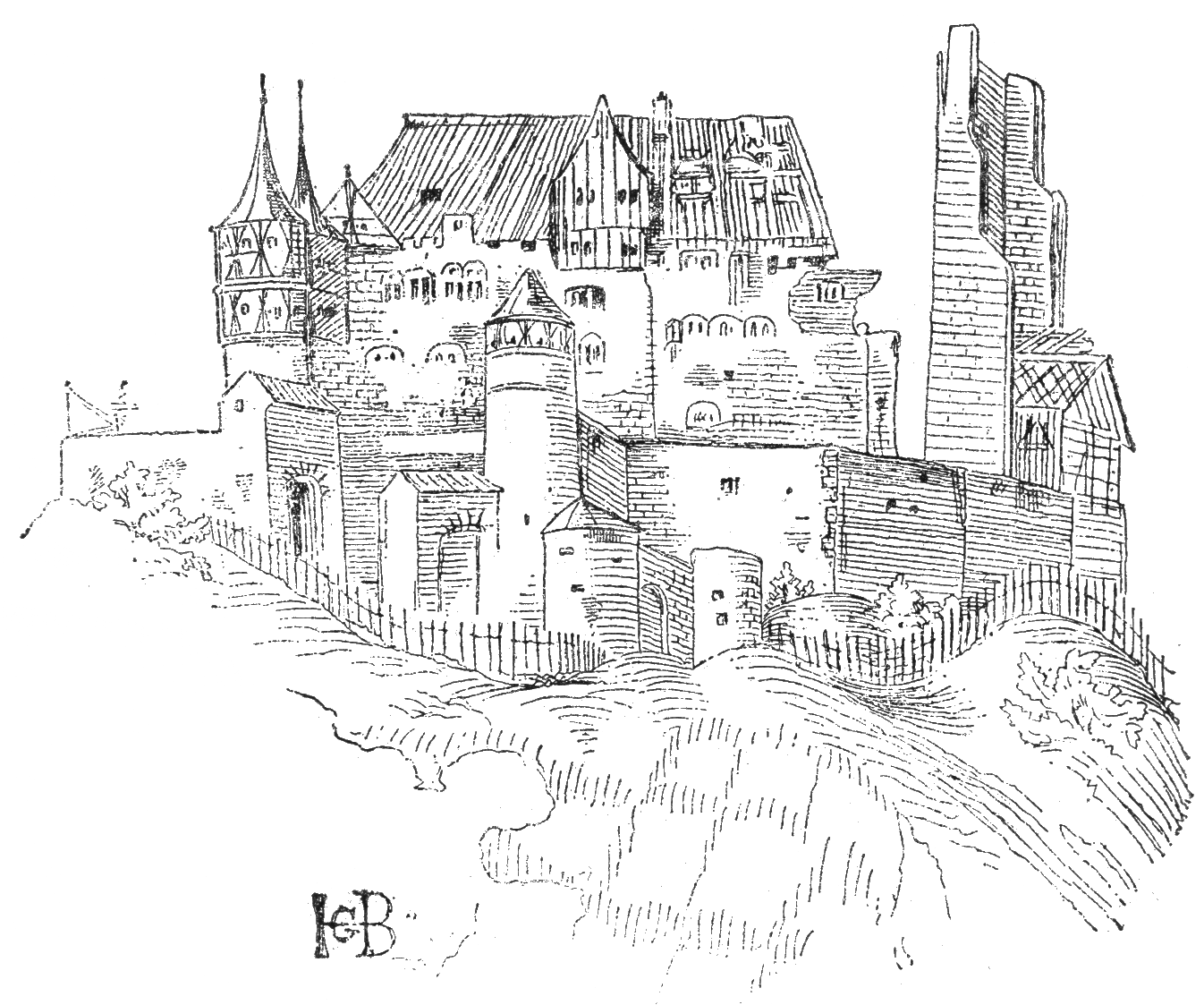
The partly ruined castle "Weibertreu" as it stood in 1515 (drawn after a sketch by Hans Baldung Grien).

This story of wifely loyalty and cunning saving their husbands became known as the "Loyal Wives of Weinsberg" (Treue Weiber von Weinsberg). The castle ruins are today known as Weibertreu ("wifely loyalty") in commemoration of the event.

The women's unique interpretation of the king's orders was used as a plot device in the modern film adaptation of the Cinderella story Ever After (1998).

The historicity of this event remains uncertain. The Grimm Brothers list it as a German legend, one of a class of similar stories German Legends, no. 493
