= Arboretum de Matton-Clémency =

Arboretum in Grand Est, France

Coordinates: 49.6667°N 5.2°E

The Arboretum de Matton-Clémency (1 hectare) is an arboretum located in Matton-et-Clémency, Ardennes, Grand Est, France. The arboretum was created by volunteers, and now contains 150 species of trees, as well as a pergola, waterwheel, and pond with bridge. It is open daily without charge. In the mid-1990s, an arboretum was created on a former vacant lot.

It is currently a well-kept natural space bordering the dark forest of the Ardennes.

== See also ==
- List of botanical gardens in France
