= Matton-et-Clémency =

- Commune
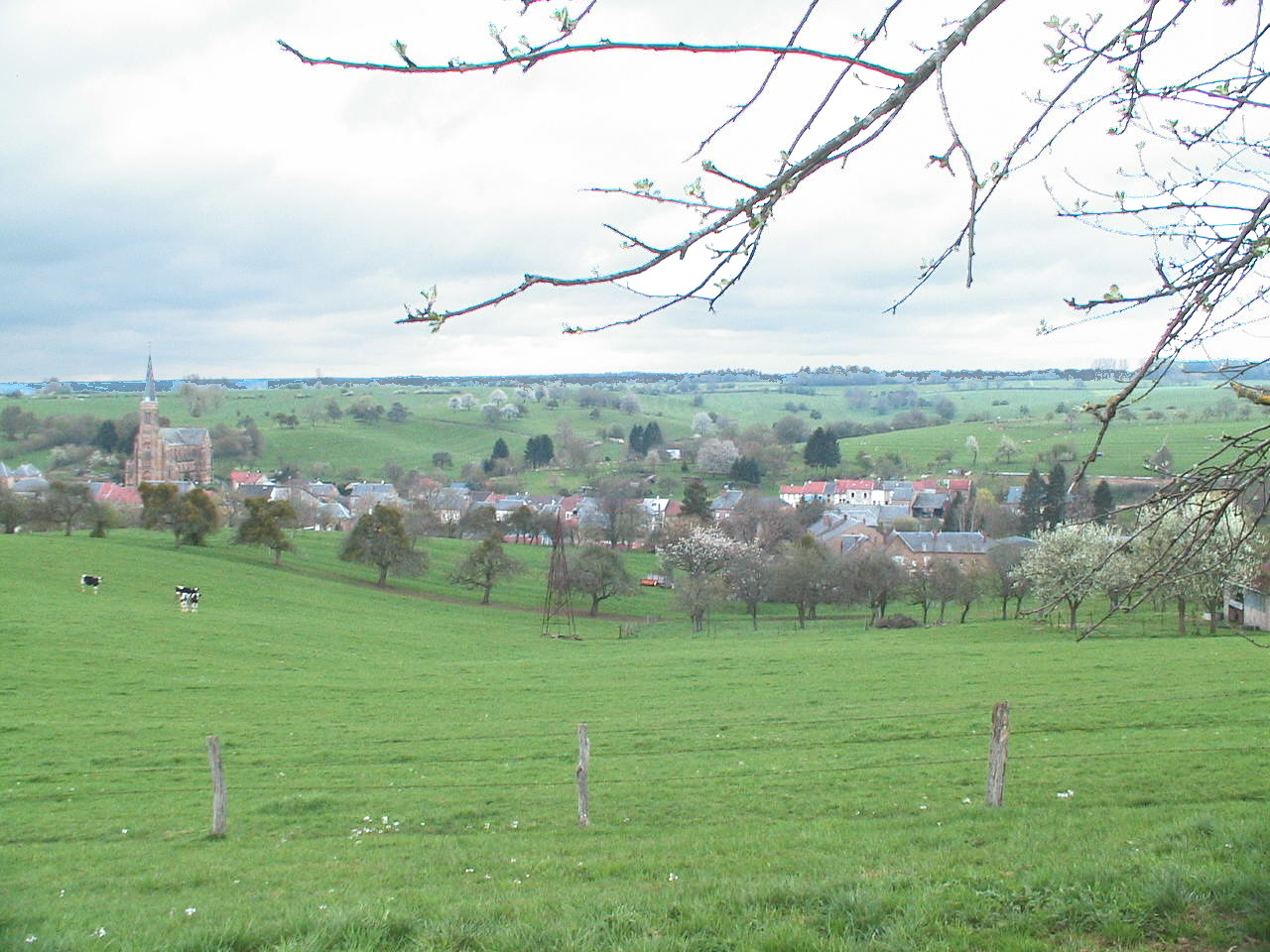
- Matton

- Coat of arms
- Location of Matton-et-Clémency
- Location within France Location within Grand Est
- Coordinates: 49°40′00″N 5°12′00″E
- Country: France
- Region: Grand Est
- Department: Ardennes
- Arrondissement: Sedan
- Canton: Carignan

Government
  - Mayor (2020–2026): Sophie Chevalier
- Area^{1}: 18.32 km^{2} (7.07 sq mi)
- Population (2023): 424
  - Density: 23.1/km^{2} (59.9/sq mi)
- Time zone: UTC+01:00 (CET)
  - Summer (DST): UTC+02:00 (CEST)
- INSEE/Postal code: 08281 /08110
- ^{1} French Land Register data, which excludes lakes, ponds, glaciers > 1 km^{2} (0.386 sq mi or 247 acres) and river estuaries.

Matton-et-Clémency (French pronunciation: [matɔ̃ e klemɑ̃si]) is a commune in the Ardennes department in northern France.

== Points of interest ==
- Arboretum de Matton-Clémency

== See also ==
- Communes of the Ardennes department
