= Matan (given name) =

- Pronunciation: Hebrew: [maˈtan]
- Gender: Predominantly male

Origin
- Origin: Hebrew
- Meaning: "giving"
- Region of origin: Ancient Israel and Judea

Other names
- Alternative spelling: Mattan, Matthan
- Related names: Mattanel, Mattaniah, Mattaniahu

Matan or Mattan (original Biblical translation: Mattan, modern Israeli translation: Matan, Hebrew: מַתָּן, Latin: Matthan) is a Hebrew name, mostly for males in Israel. It comes from the word 'gift' and literally means "giving". It is part of the title of the Jewish holiday of Shavuot that is also known as "Z'man Mattan Torah" meaning "[the] time [of the] giving [of the] Torah."

A biblical reference for a Mattan as a given name is the story told in Books of Kings about the Baal priest Mattan, killed by the people of the Kingdom of Judah during a revolution.

In the Gospel of Matthew, Matthan is the paternal grandfather of Joseph, father of Jesus.

King Zedekiah's birth name was originally Mattanyahu.

== People ==
- Matan Balestra (born 1992), Israeli footballer currently playing for Sektzia Nes Tziona on loan from Maccabi Netanya
- Matan Baltaxa (born 1995), Israeli footballer currently playing for Hapoel Acre
- Matan Barashi (born 1988), Israeli footballer currently playing for Ironi Beit Shemesh
- Matan Cohen (born 1982), Israeli musician
- Matan Even (born 2007), American comedian and activist
- Matan Hodorov (born 1985), Israeli television commentator
- Matan Hozez (born 1996), Israeli footballer currently playing for Bnei Yehuda
- Matan Kahana (born 1972), Israeli politician
- Matan Naor (born 1980), Israeli basketball player
- Matan Ohayon (born 1986), Israeli footballer currently playing for Israeli club Hapoel Be'er Sheva
- Matan Porat (born 1982), Israeli pianist and composer
- Matan Roditi (born 1998), Israeli Olympic marathon swimmer
- Matan Vilnai (born 1944), Israeli politician and military officer
- Matan Zohar (born 1990), British musician
- Nur Matan Abdi, Somali politician and military commander
- Matan Peretz (born 1988), Israeli social media personality
