= Carignan, Ardennes =

Carignan
- Commune
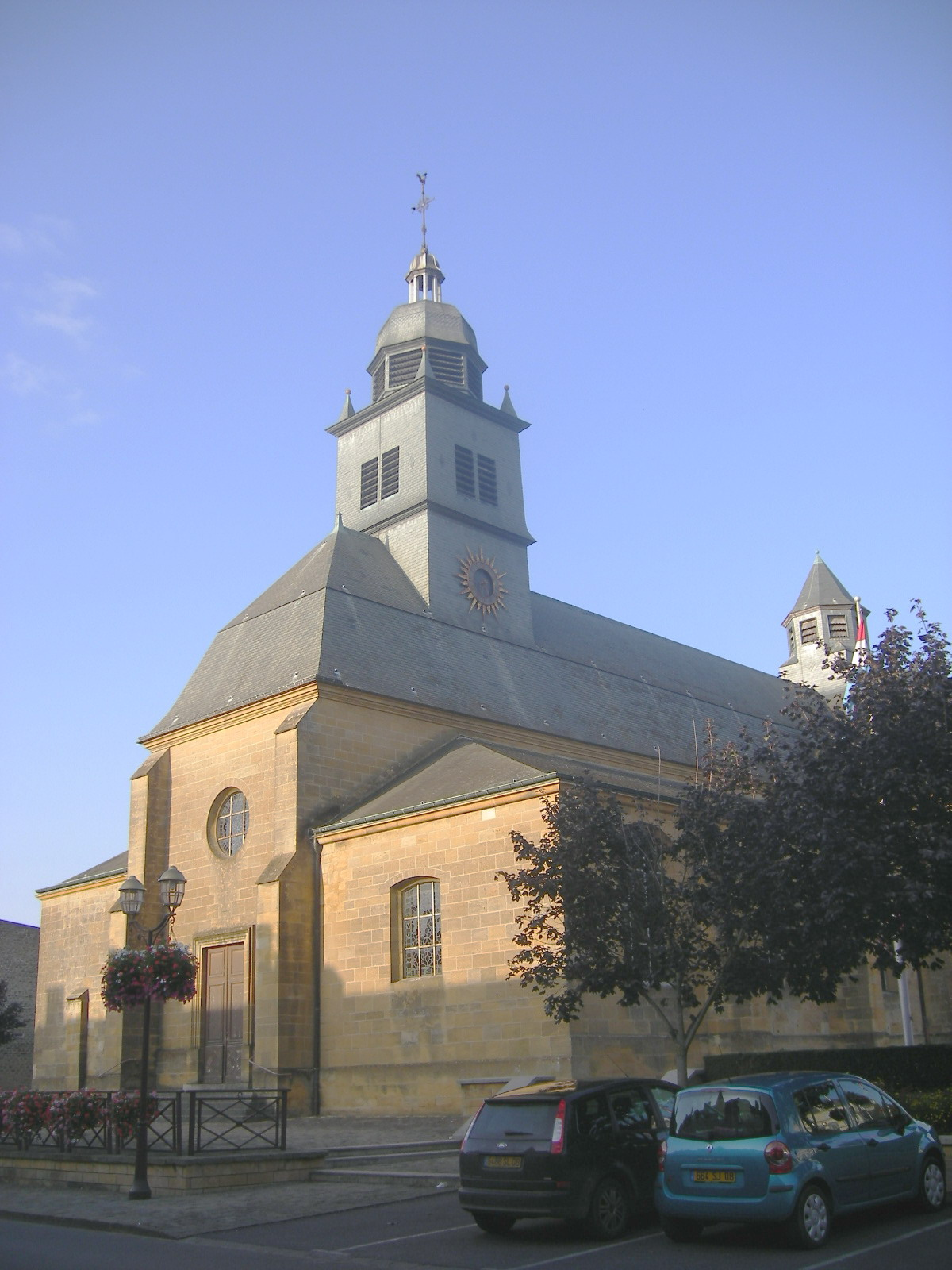
- The church in Carignan

- Coat of arms
- Location of Carignan
- Location within France Location within Grand Est
- Coordinates: 49°38′00″N 5°10′07″E
- Country: France
- Region: Grand Est
- Department: Ardennes
- Arrondissement: Sedan
- Canton: Carignan
- Intercommunality: Portes du Luxembourg

Government
  - Mayor (2024–2026): Gilbert Lordier
- Area^{1}: 14.01 km^{2} (5.41 sq mi)
- Highest elevation: 293 m (961 ft)
- Lowest elevation: 161 m (528 ft)
- Population (2023): 2,680
  - Density: 191/km^{2} (495/sq mi)
- Time zone: UTC+01:00 (CET)
  - Summer (DST): UTC+02:00 (CEST)
- INSEE/Postal code: 08090 /08110
- ^{1} French Land Register data, which excludes lakes, ponds, glaciers > 1 km^{2} (0.386 sq mi or 247 acres) and river estuaries.

Carignan (French pronunciation: [kaʁiɲɑ̃]) is a commune in the Ardennes department in northern France. It is the seat of a canton. It was known as Yvoy or Yvois until 1662.

== History ==
Carignan was, under the name Epoissium, Eposium, Epusum or Ivosium, a military settlement of the Romans. Gaugericus, bishop of Cambrai, was born in Eposium around 550. A little later it was the home of a stylite ascetic named Wulflaich.

As Yvois, it was part of the Burgundian Netherlands in the 15th century. It changed hands between the Habsburg Netherlands and France several times, until it was assigned to France by the 1659 Treaty of the Pyrenees. The town was given as a duchy to Prince Eugène-Maurice of Savoy-Carignan, and renamed Carignan in 1662.

== Population ==
Historical population
| Year | Pop. | ±% p.a. |
|---|---|---|
| 1968 | 3,674 | — |
| 1975 | 3,724 | +0.19% |
| 1982 | 3,646 | −0.30% |
| 1990 | 3,359 | −1.02% |
| 1999 | 3,259 | −0.34% |
| 2007 | 3,178 | −0.31% |
| 2012 | 2,987 | −1.23% |
| 2017 | 2,885 | −0.69% |
| 2023 | 2,680 | −1.22% |
Source: INSEE

== International relations ==
Carignan is twinned with:

- Weinsberg, Germany

== See also ==
- Communes of the Ardennes department
