= Autrecourt-et-Pourron =

- Commune
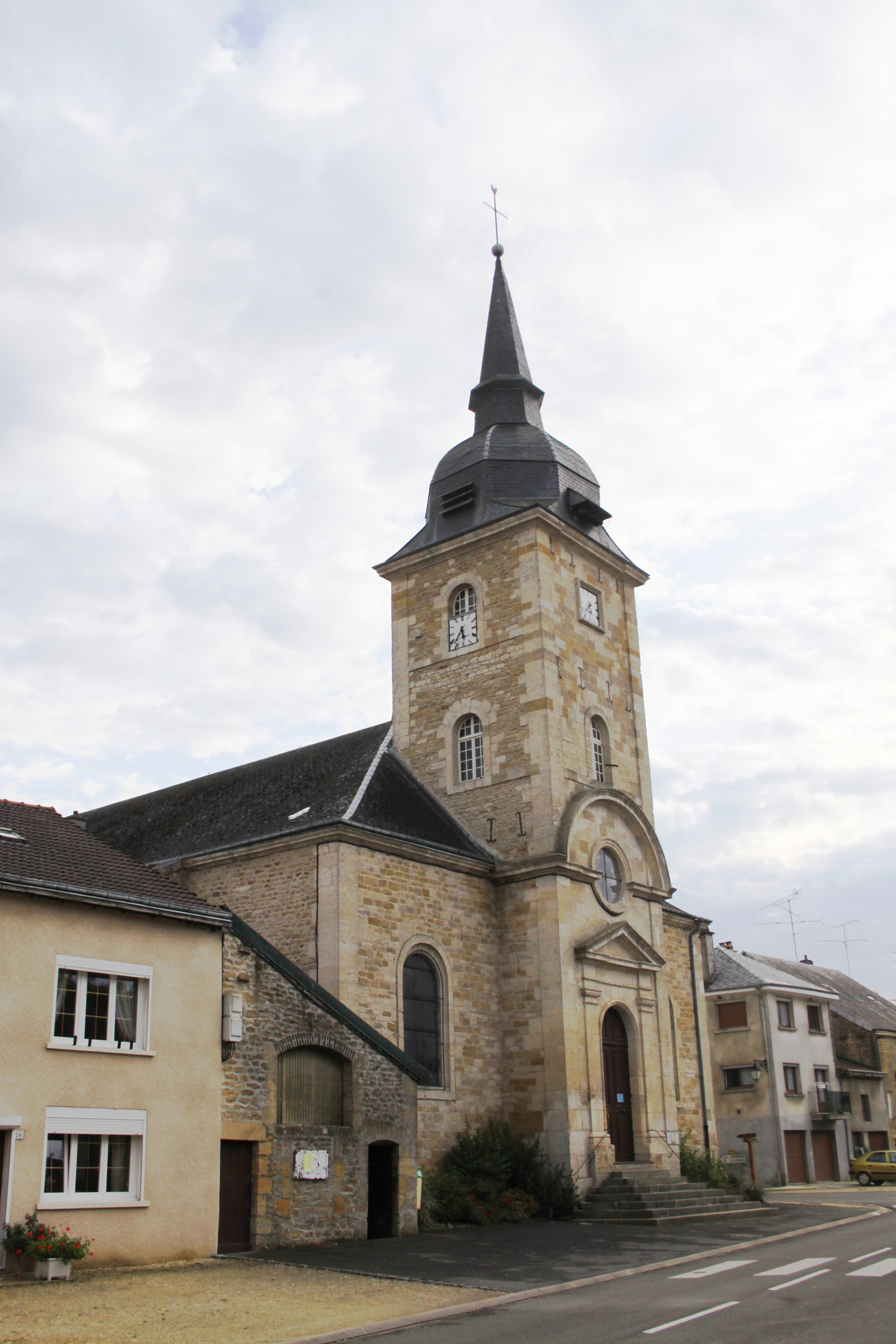
- The Church of Saint-Victor

- Coat of arms
- Location of Autrecourt-et-Pourron
- Location within France Location within Grand Est
- Coordinates: 49°36′46″N 5°01′50″E
- Country: France
- Region: Grand Est
- Department: Ardennes
- Arrondissement: Sedan
- Canton: Carignan
- Intercommunality: CC Portes Luxembourg

Government
  - Mayor (2020–2026): Brice Parisot
- Area^{1}: 12.04 km^{2} (4.65 sq mi)
- Elevation: 165 m (541 ft)
- Highest elevation: 312 m (1,024 ft)
- Lowest elevation: 154 m (505 ft)
- Population (2023): 342
  - Density: 28.4/km^{2} (73.6/sq mi)
- Time zone: UTC+01:00 (CET)
  - Summer (DST): UTC+02:00 (CEST)
- INSEE/Postal code: 08034 /08210
- ^{1} French Land Register data, which excludes lakes, ponds, glaciers > 1 km^{2} (0.386 sq mi or 247 acres) and river estuaries.

Autrecourt-et-Pourron (French pronunciation: [otʁəkuʁ e puʁɔ̃]) is a commune in the Ardennes department in the Grand Est region of northern France.

== Geography ==
Autrecourt-et-Pourron is located some 19 km south-east of Sedan and 6 km north-west of Mouzon. Access to the commune is by the D4 road from Remilly-Aillicourt in the north which passes through the commune and the village and continues south to join the D30 west of Beaumont-en-Argonne. The D27 road branches east off the D6 just north of Raucourt-et-Flaba and passes through the commune and the village before continuing south-east to join the D19 west of Mouzon. A railway line passes through the village but there is no station with the nearest station at Mouzon. West of the village the commune has large areas of forest but the east and south are mostly farmland.

The Meuse river forms the north-eastern border of the commune as it flows north-west. The Ruisseau de Brouhan rises towards the west of the commune and flows east through the village to join the Meuse. The Ruisseau de Yoncq forms the south-eastern border of the commune as it flows north-east to join the Meuse.

=== Heraldry ===
Arms of Autrecourt-et-Pourron	Blazon: Or, a bend sinister charged with three mullets of 6 points of Argent, debruised in chief by a crescent of Gules and in base by an Oak leaf of Vert posed in bend sinister.

== Administration ==
List of Successive Mayors

From	To	Name
2001	2008	Raymond le Ferrand
2008	2020	Alain Alexandre
2020	current	Brice Parisot

== Demography ==
The inhabitants of the commune are known as Autrecourtois or Autrecourtoises in French. The population data given in the table and graph below for 1821 and earlier refer to the former commune of Autrecourt.

Historical population

Year	Pop.	±% p.a.
1793	535	—
1821	640	+0.64%
1831	907	+3.55%
1846	906	−0.01%
1872	916	+0.04%
1901	567	−1.64%
1926	439	−1.02%
1946	357	−1.03%
1962	472	+1.76%

Year	Pop.	±% p.a.
1968	483	+0.38%
1975	442	−1.26%
1982	442	+0.00%
1990	383	−1.77%
1999	350	−1.00%
2007	348	−0.07%
2012	349	+0.06%
2017	342	−0.40%
2023	342	+0.00%

Source: EHESS and INSEE

== Culture and heritage ==
=== Civil heritage ===
The commune has two buildings that are registered as historical monuments:

- A former Arms Factory (1787)
- A former Chateau (17th century)

=== Religious heritage ===
The Church of Saint-Victor contains two items that are registered as historical objects:

- A Credence Table (18th century)
- The Altar, Retable, and Painting: Saint John the Baptist (19th century)

== See also ==
- Communes of the Ardennes department
