= Autrecourt =

Autrecourt or Autrécourt may refer to:

- Autrecourt-et-Pourron, commune in the Ardennes department in northern France
- Autrécourt-sur-Aire, commune in the Meuse department in the Lorraine region in north-eastern France
- Nicholas of Autrecourt (1299–1369), French medieval philosopher and Scholastic theologian
