= Puilly-et-Charbeaux =

- Commune
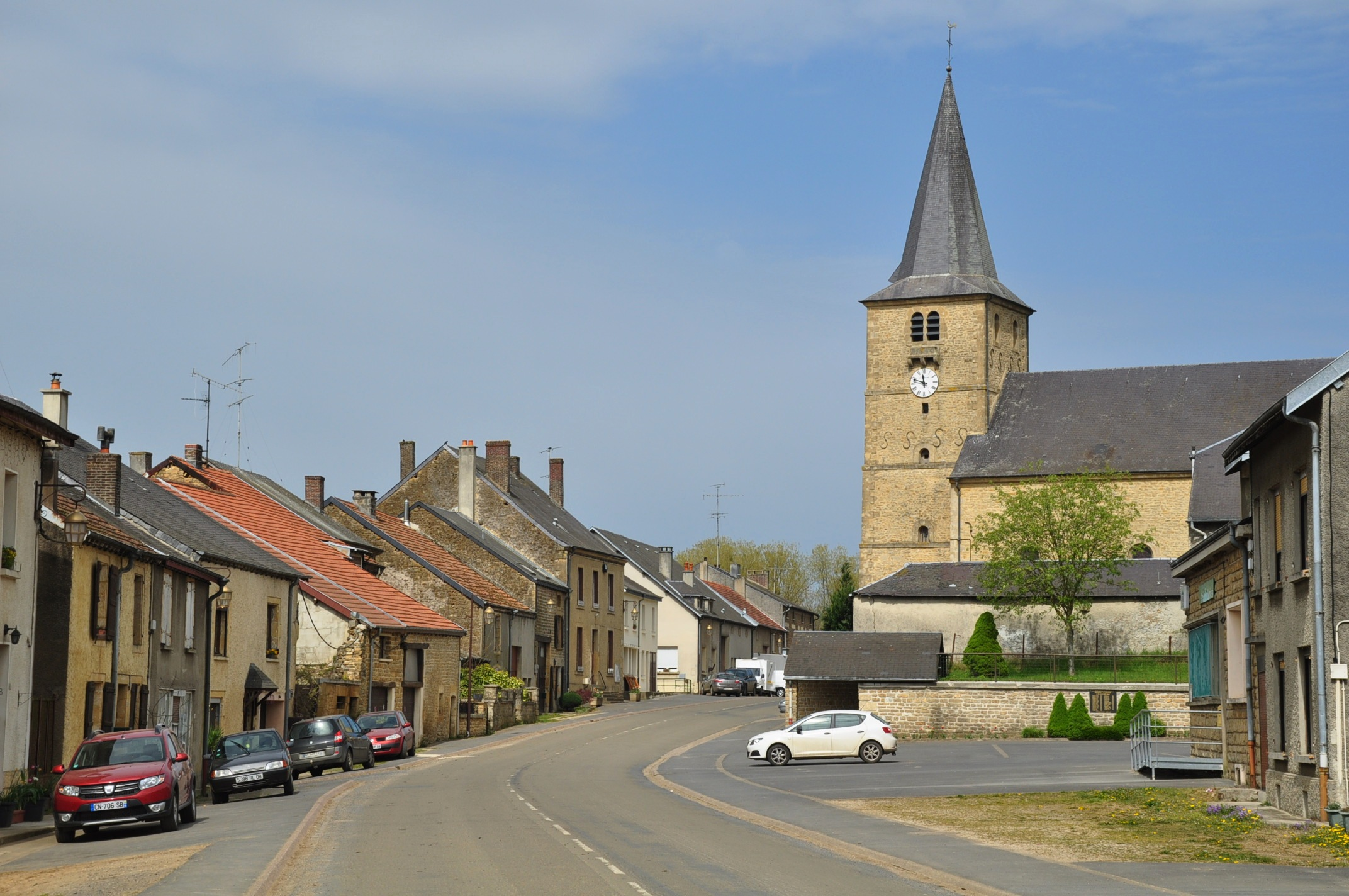
- The church and surroundings in Puilly-et-Charbeaux

- Coat of arms
- Location of Puilly-et-Charbeaux
- Location within France Location within Grand Est
- Coordinates: 49°37′51″N 5°16′18″E
- Country: France
- Region: Grand Est
- Department: Ardennes
- Arrondissement: Sedan
- Canton: Carignan

Government
  - Mayor (2020–2026): Jean-Bernard Choisit
- Area^{1}: 18.29 km^{2} (7.06 sq mi)
- Elevation: 212 m (696 ft)
- Population (2023): 219
  - Density: 12.0/km^{2} (31.0/sq mi)
- Time zone: UTC+01:00 (CET)
  - Summer (DST): UTC+02:00 (CEST)
- INSEE/Postal code: 08347 /08370
- ^{1} French Land Register data, which excludes lakes, ponds, glaciers > 1 km^{2} (0.386 sq mi or 247 acres) and river estuaries.

Puilly-et-Charbeaux (French pronunciation: [pyji e ʃaʁbo]) is a commune (municipality) in the Ardennes department in northern France, bordering Belgium. The municipality has two villages: Charbeaux and Puilly-et-Charbeaux, the latter is the larger one and is sometimes called Puilly. In France Puilly-et-Charbeaux borders no less than 9 other municipalities: Auflance, Moiry, Fromy, Linay, Blagny, Les Deux-Villes, Tremblois-les-Carignan, Mogues and Williers.

== Population ==
Historical population
Year	Pop.	±% p.a.
1968	384	—
1975	325	−2.35%
1982	305	−0.90%
1990	258	−2.07%
1999	244	−0.62%
2007	255	+0.55%
2012	264	+0.70%
2017	227	−2.97%
2023	219	−0.60%
Source: INSEE

== See also ==
- Communes of the Ardennes department
