= Auflance =

- Commune
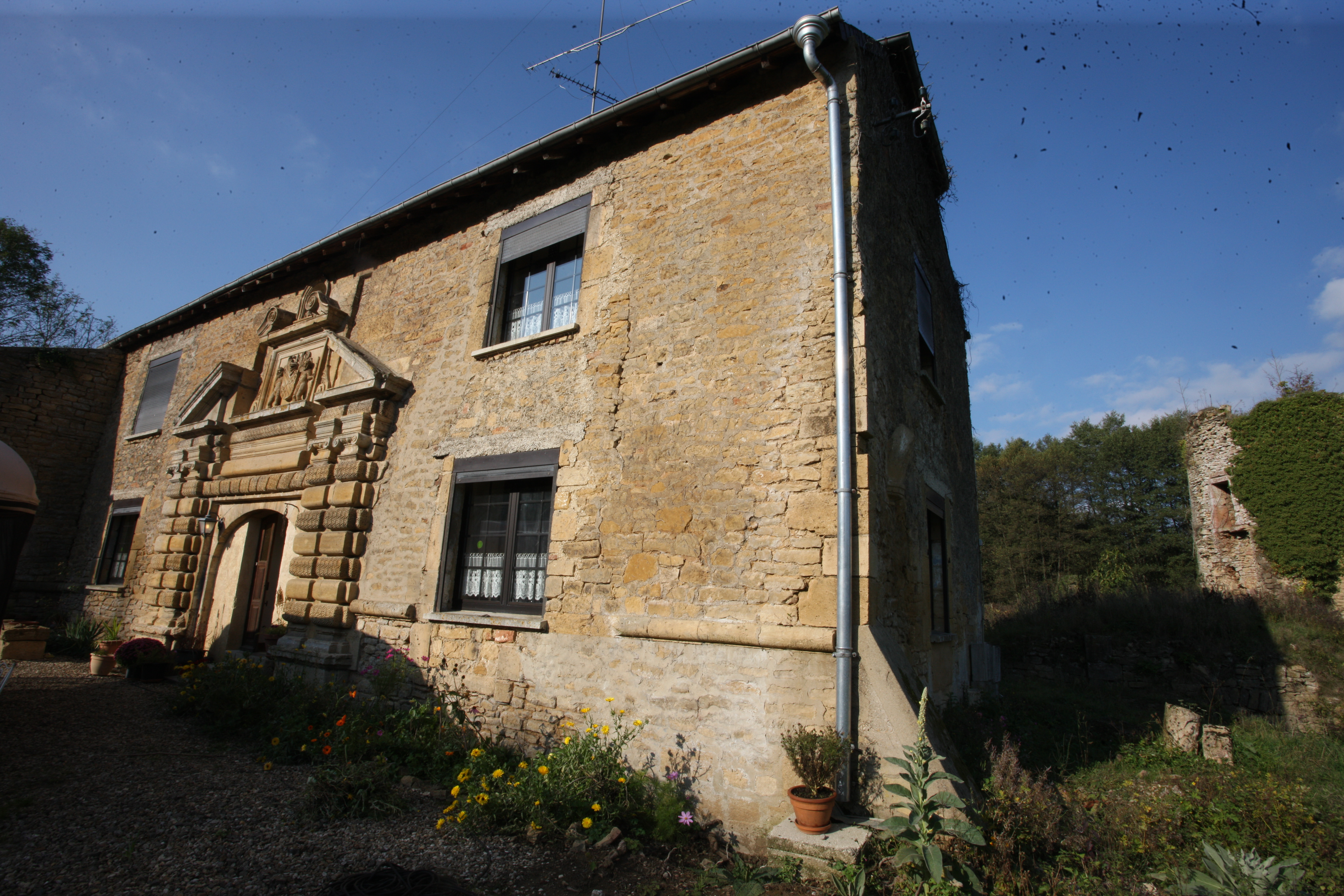
- Ruins of the chateau

- Coat of arms
- Location of Auflance
- Location within France Location within Grand Est
- Coordinates: 49°37′11″N 5°17′31″E
- Country: France
- Region: Grand Est
- Department: Ardennes
- Arrondissement: Sedan
- Canton: Carignan
- Intercommunality: CC Portes du Luxembourg

Government
  - Mayor (2020–2026): Jean-Marie Turchi
- Area^{1}: 6.16 km^{2} (2.38 sq mi)
- Elevation: 193 m (633 ft)
- Highest elevation: 281 m (922 ft)
- Lowest elevation: 176 m (577 ft)
- Population (2023): 82
  - Density: 13/km^{2} (34/sq mi)
- Time zone: UTC+01:00 (CET)
  - Summer (DST): UTC+02:00 (CEST)
- INSEE/Postal code: 08029 /08370
- ^{1} French Land Register data, which excludes lakes, ponds, glaciers > 1 km^{2} (0.386 sq mi or 247 acres) and river estuaries.

Auflance is a commune in the Ardennes department and Grand Est region of north-eastern France.

== Geography ==
Auflance is located on the frontier of Belgium along its eastern border some 38 km east by south-east of Sedan and 17 km north-west of Montmédy. Access to the commune is by the D17 road from Puilly-et-Charbeaux in the north-west which passes through the centre of the commune and the village and continues to Sapogne-sur-Marche in the south-east. A small country road crosses the Belgian border and goes to Villers-Devant-Orval. The commune is mixed forest and farmland.

The Marche river forms the south-eastern border of the commune as it flows south-west to join the Chiers near Margut. The Paquis river passes through the centre of the commune from north-west to south-east where it joins the Marche on the border of the commune. The Coquerte flows from the north in the west to the commune to join the Paquis.

=== Heraldry ===
Arms of Auflance	Blazon: Or, a bend of Sable charged with 3 Fleurs-de-lis Argent posed in bend côtoyée with 2 bendlets of Sable; in chief Gules.

== Administration ==
List of Successive Mayors

From	To	Name
2001	2014	Michèle Delgoffe
2014	2020	Sabrina Thiébault
2020	current	Jean-Marie Turchi

== Demography ==
Historical population

Year	Pop.	±% p.a.
1793	276	—
1821	291	+0.19%
1846	333	+0.54%
1872	279	−0.68%
1901	238	−0.55%
1921	176	−1.50%
1936	114	−2.85%
1946	117	+0.26%
1962	130	+0.66%

Year	Pop.	±% p.a.
1968	134	+0.51%
1975	105	−3.42%
1982	100	−0.69%
1990	104	+0.49%
1999	91	−1.47%
2007	90	−0.14%
2012	82	−1.84%
2017	86	+0.96%
2023	82	−0.79%

Source: EHESS and INSEE

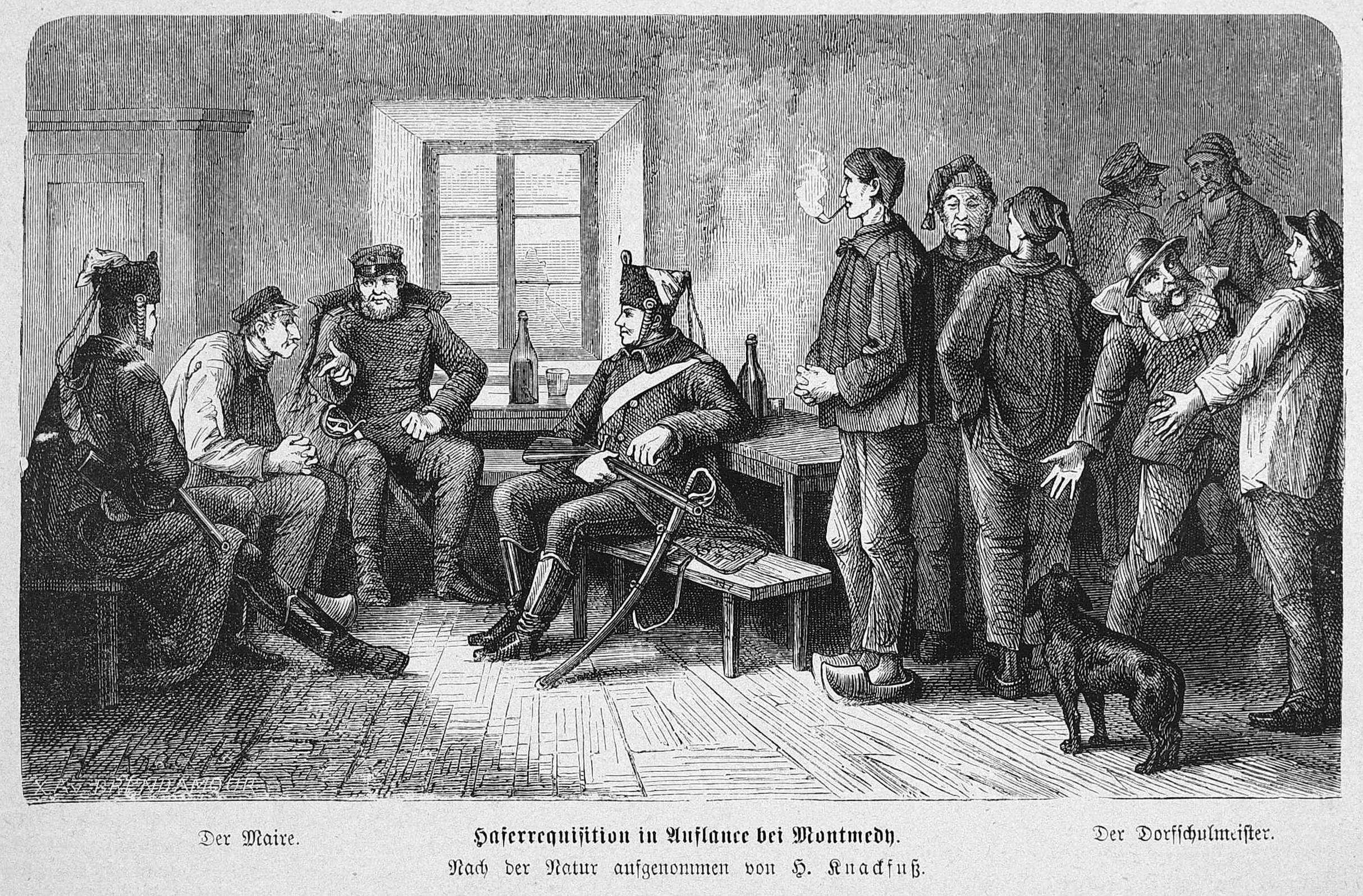
A Haferrequisition at Auflance in 1871 from Die Gartenlaube (The Gazebo)

== Sites and monuments ==
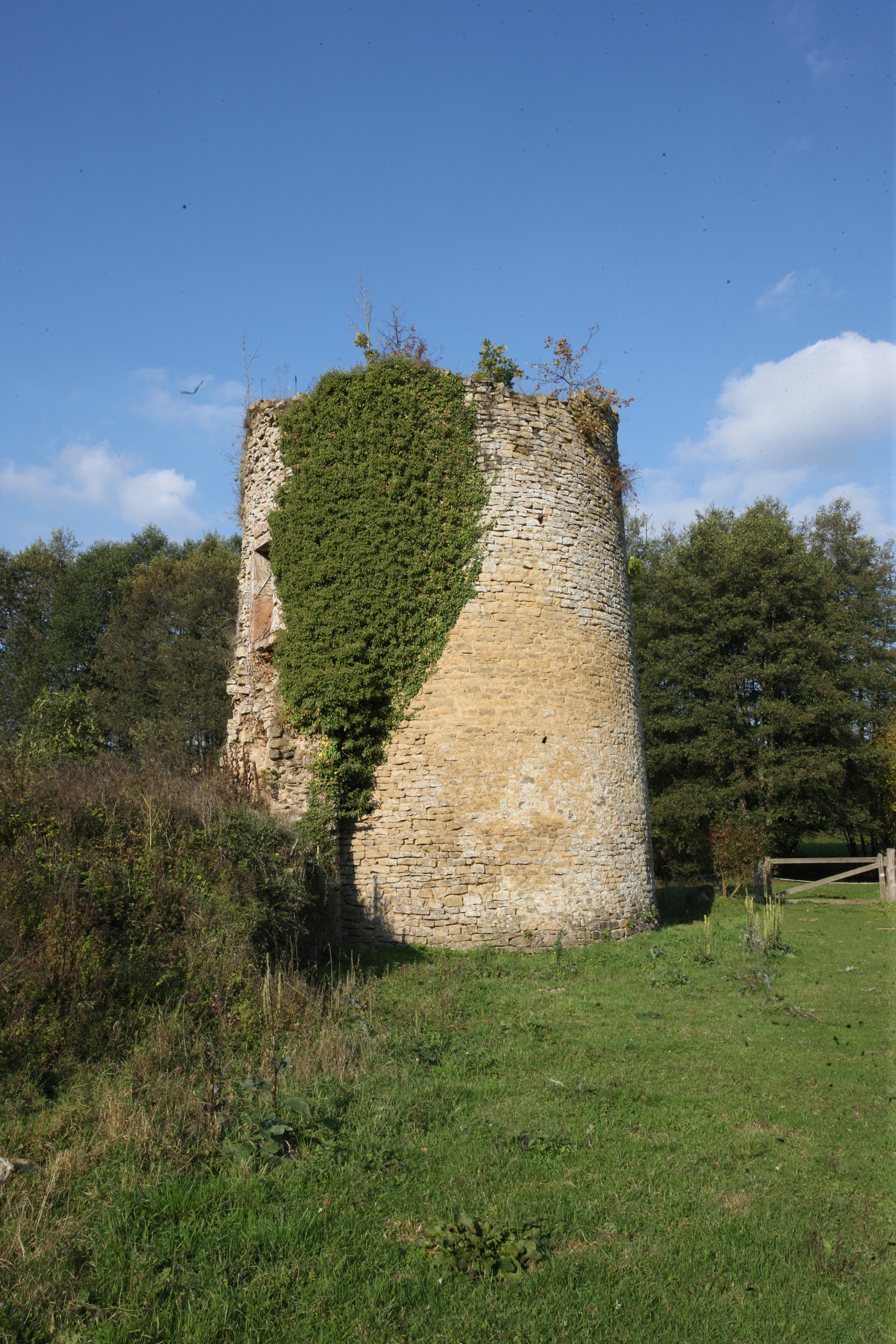
The round tower

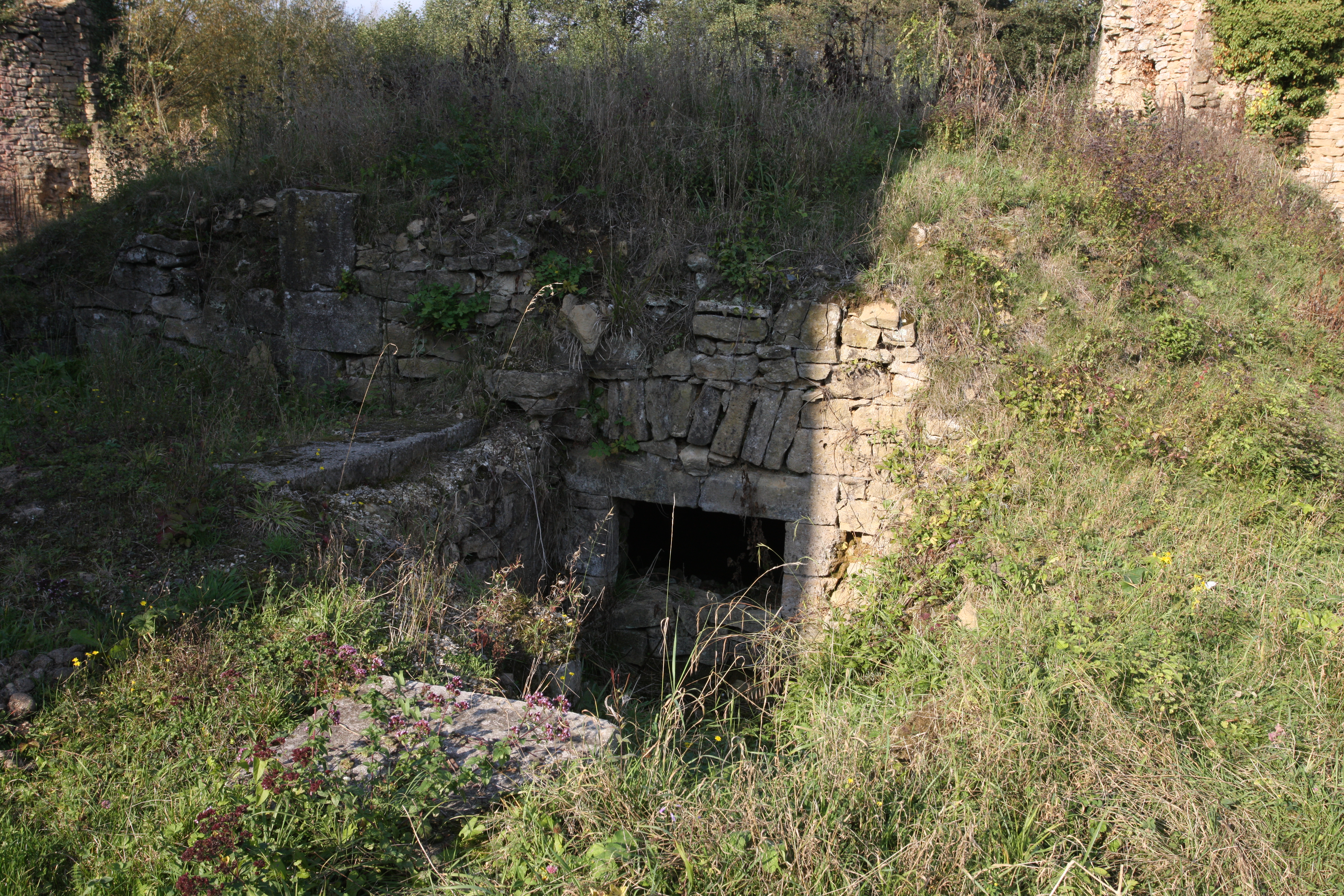
Tunnel

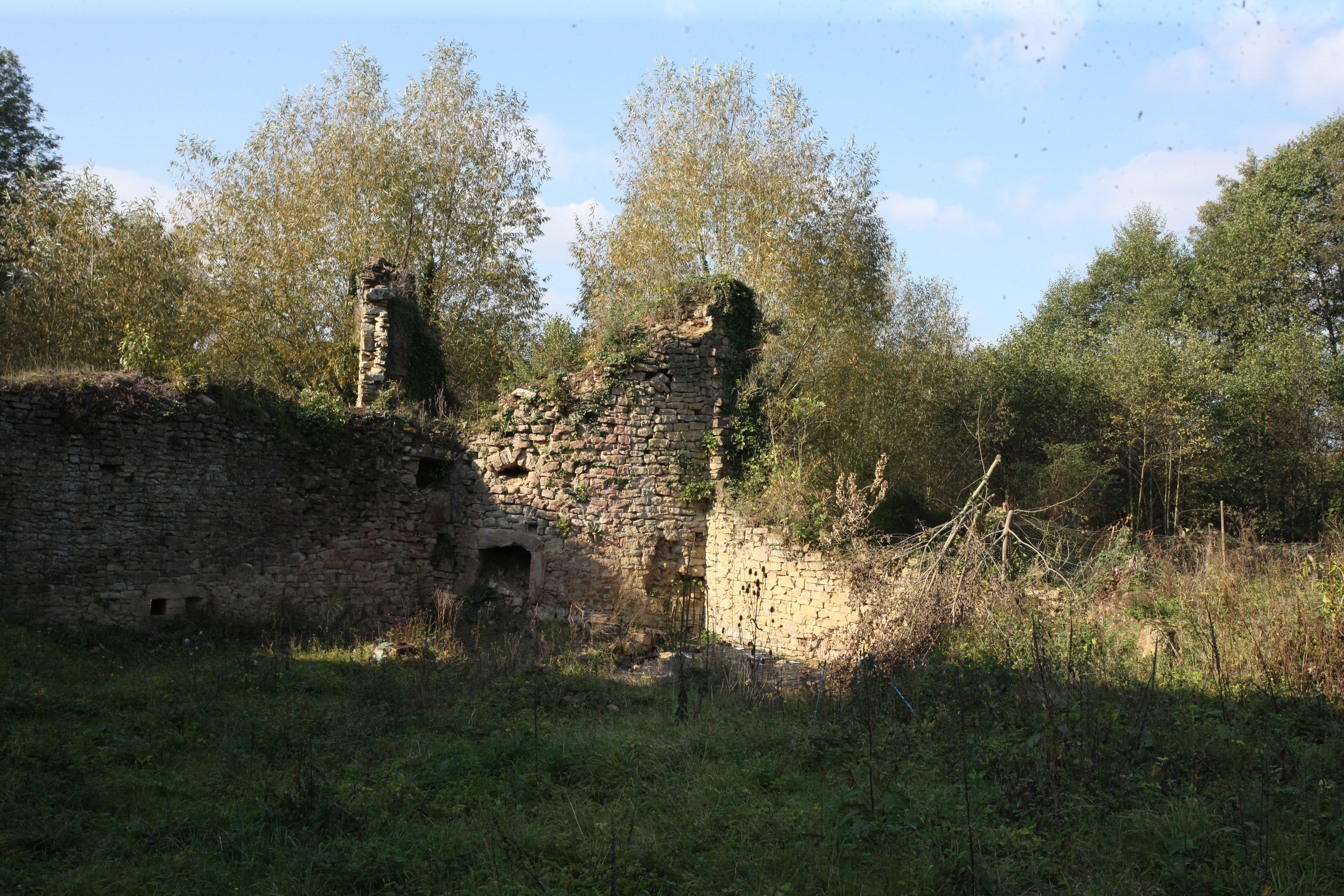
Remains of the Chateau

- The Chateau of Auflance (17th century) is registered as a historical monument. In the 17th century the Custine family came to settle in this border commune. They built a castle of which only a few vestiges remain: a round tower, tunnels, and a remarkable Renaissance door decorated with coats of arms and surmounted by a Pietà.
- In the Church the Funeral Chapel of the Custines has a hallway decorated with coats of arms which were made during the French Revolution
- The Saints of Auflance Chapel from the 13th century has 13 statues which have been stored out of fear of theft. These statues of the Saints of Auflance are registered as historical objects.

== See also ==
- Communes of the Ardennes department
