= Margut =

- Commune
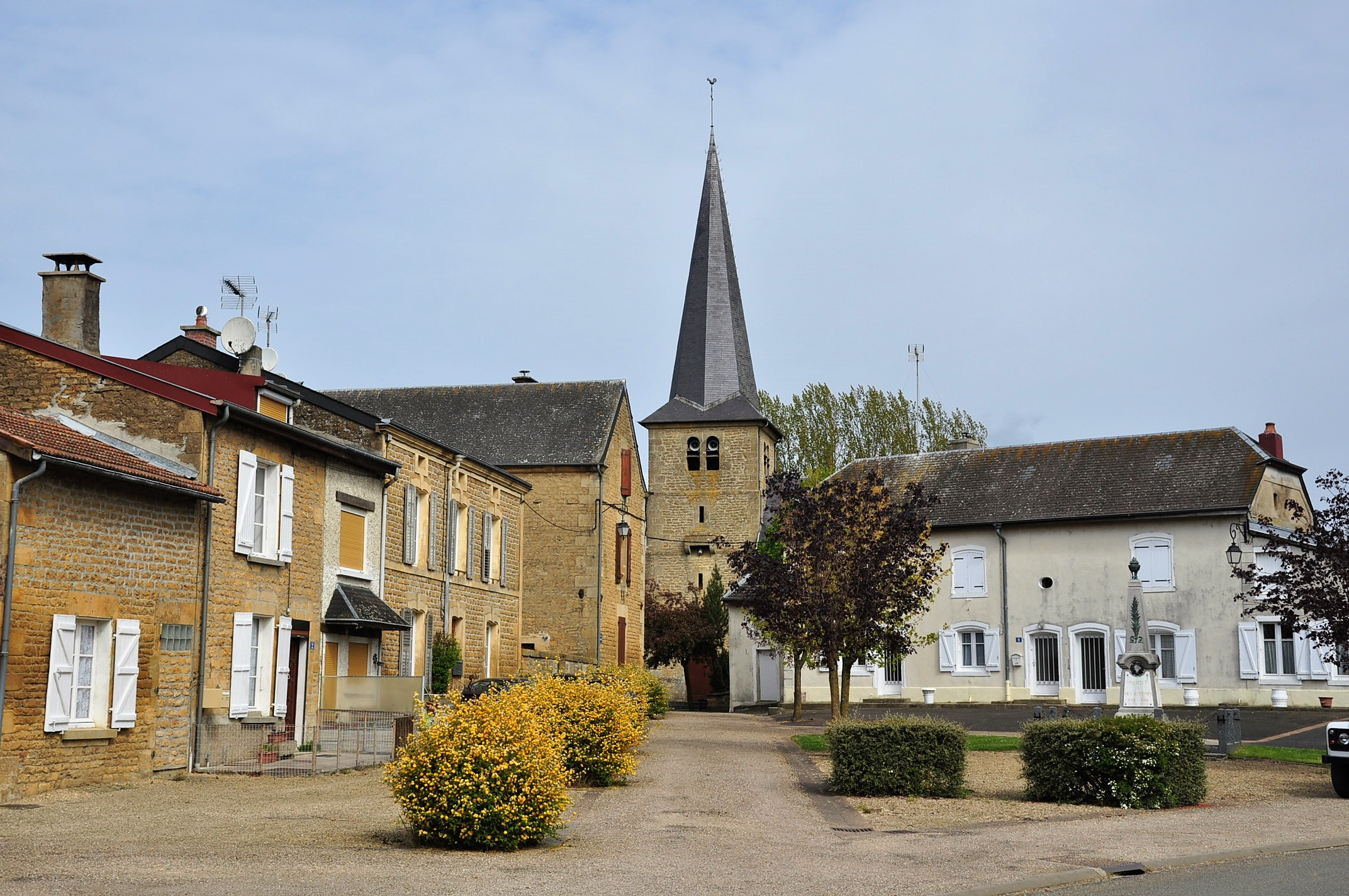
- Place du Monument
- Location of Margut
- Location within France Location within Grand Est
- Coordinates: 49°35′06″N 5°15′41″E
- Country: France
- Region: Grand Est
- Department: Ardennes
- Arrondissement: Sedan
- Canton: Carignan
- Intercommunality: Portes du Luxembourg

Government
  - Mayor (2020–2026): Pierre Debouw
- Area^{1}: 7.53 km^{2} (2.91 sq mi)
- Elevation: 174 m (571 ft)
- Highest elevation: 350 m (1,150 ft)
- Lowest elevation: 166 m (545 ft)
- Population (2023): 700
  - Density: 93/km^{2} (240/sq mi)
- Time zone: UTC+01:00 (CET)
  - Summer (DST): UTC+02:00 (CEST)
- INSEE/Postal code: 08276 /08370
- ^{1} French Land Register data, which excludes lakes, ponds, glaciers > 1 km^{2} (0.386 sq mi or 247 acres) and river estuaries.

Margut (French pronunciation: [maʁɡy]) is a commune in the Ardennes department in northern France.

== Geography ==
=== Access ===
Margut is a small village of 860 inhabitants located in the canton of Carignan, in the eastern part of the department of Ardennes. Administratively attached to the Grand Est, the town is under the influence of the cultural regions Lorraine (the department of Meuse) and Gaume (southeastern Belgium), as it is less than five miles from the border of Belgium as the crow flies.

=== Hydrography ===
Margut lies at the confluence of the Carité, a stream that has its source in Signy-Montlibert and the Marche, a river that flows in Belgium, near Orval. The river, which hosts trout and grayling, flows into the Chiers, a tributary of the Meuse, between Margut and La Ferté-sur-Chiers.

== Economy ==
The chief town of the district until the early nineteenth century, Margut retains a village-center role since its school system (nursery and primary) welcomes students from fifteen surrounding communities. But its influence has been diminishing in recent years. The town has been hard hit by the departure of public services, the college which opened in the mid 60s was permanently closed in June 2004, and more recently, the Post Office has seen its schedule cut by half. In economic terms, Margut was known for its rich industry during the twentieth century. But again, the town saw its factories close. Lactalis corporation (formerly Besnier) has been employing up to a hundred people but was closed in 2002. In 2009, the agricultural credit was removed, despite a mobilization of local elected officials and the public. Today, there are only two factories operating; Tagar, specializing in metallurgy and Nouyrigat, a sawmill.

== History ==
=== Origins of Margut ===
According to the abbot Hamon who created a monograph on Margut in 1876, the origin of Margut is relatively difficult to define. We know that the Stylite monk Saint Walfroy came to evangelize the region in the sixth century, but no information exists as to exactly when the village of Margut was created. The oldest part of the town is undoubtedly the place called Champel, located at the foot of the hill of Saint-Walfroy. In 812, Champel was given by Charlemagne and his niece Moniane to the Abbey of Saint-Remi of Reims. This is one of the oldest written records on the area of Margut. The village itself, then called Margurium, appeared for the first time in the ninth century, in a charter written by Hillin, Archbishop of Trier. The latter, in his writings describes the invasions of the Normans in the ninth century, and mentions the "villa sancto Wolfaïco" (St. Walfroy) and Margurio (Margut), a small village on the banks of the march.

=== Middle Ages Margut ===
The main event marking the historic medieval period of Margut is the signature of the peace, in 980, between Emperor Otto II (955 - 7 December 983) and King Lothair of France. In the summer of 978, Lothaire led a raid against Aachen, but the imperial family escaped. Otto in retaliation invaded northern France in the autumn and besieged Paris, defended by Hugh Capet. After three days the Emperor retreated pursued by the French. He lost his rearguard during the crossing of the Aisne river. It was not until 980 that peace was signed in Margut, which was then located at the border between the two kingdoms, ending the Franco-German war of 978–980.

Another event mentioned by abbot Hamon in his monograph was the donation by the Count of Chiny to the monastery of Orval in 1173. This involved the donation of pre Carité, Caritas, located on the banks of Margut. In the 1340s the village was sold to the Count of Luxembourg, Jean the Blind. Margut then follows the history of the County of Luxembourg until its attachment to the Kingdom of France with the Treaty of the Pyrenees in 1659. In 1443, the conquest of Luxembourg by Philip the Good ended. Margut became part of a group that became known as the Burgundian Netherlands. In 1477, the granddaughter of Philip the Good of Burgundy, Marguerite married Maximilian I, Holy Roman Emperor and her dowry, in addition to the Franche-Comté, was the Burgundian Netherlands.

=== Sixteenth through eighteenth centuries ===
Throughout the sixteenth century, the village had to suffer various conflicts that had bloodied the region, including wars between the Empire and the Kingdom of France and the Wars of Religion. In 1623, then in the midst of the Thirty Years' War, Margut was plundered by the troops of Ernst von Mansfeld, then in 1635 by the mercenaries commanded by Johann von Werth. They were known for their extreme cruelty and left a terrible memory. Meyrac in his Géographie illustrée des Ardennes tells us that the inhabitants of Margut "were forced to flee after being hunted like wild beasts." With the Treaty of the Pyrenees in 1659, Margut finally became French. In 1662, Margut is erected to Duchy-Peerage by King Louis XIV in favor of Eugene Maurice, Count of Soissons. Throughout the eighteenth century, the inhabitants of Margut came into conflict with several neighboring towns (La Ferte, Fromy, Signy-Montlibert ...) and even against the monks of Orval. In 1793, the detachment of soldiers who burned the monastery of Orval, formerly the owner of extensive lands and properties in the area was Margut.

=== After the Revolution Margut ===
==== The local politics since 1985 ====
At the death of Henry Vin, former mayor and deputy general counsel (1977 to 1978), 1985, voters went to the polls to appoint a new councilor. It was Claude Varoquaux who was elected. As to the appointment of the mayor and deputy it was Serge Claisse, former first deputy of Henri Wine, who was elected mayor until the end of the term, that is to say 1989. At the cantonal level, Michel Marchet, succeeded to the position of General Counsel.

In 1989, three separate lists were presented to the voters: the incumbent mayor, Serge Claisse, another led by Joseph Pluta, outgoing councilor, and the last, which included only nine candidates, by Yves Surmonne. After a stormy election campaign it was the list led by Joseph Pluta, principal of the college, which carried the majority; the list of Serge Claisse getting only four out of fifteen elected councilors.

In 1995, two lists are presented to the electorate, that of the outgoing majority led by Joseph Pluta, and a list of opposition led by Serge Claisse. One round was enough to designate the new city council since the list of Joseph Pluta prevailed with fifteen seats and he was also re-elected mayor.

In 2001, four lists were presented to the voters, the incumbent mayor, Joseph Pluta, another led by Serge Claisse, honorary mayor, the third line by Claude Varoquaux and Daniel Fontaine, outgoing councilors, and the last, led by Pierre Watrin and Fabien Surmonne. After the first round, only Joseph Pluta was elected. This left fourteen seats in the second round on 18 March. The list is led by Joseph Pluta won four seats, one led by Claude Varoquaux (which had merged with that of Peter Watrin), ten seats. Claude Varoquaux was elected mayor.

In March 2008, a new four lists that appear in municipal elections. One led by the mayor, Claude Varoquaux with eight candidates, another led by First Deputy, Corinne Gallerne including fifteen members, including six councilors outgoing one led by Joseph Pluta also includes fifteen candidates whose outgoing six councilors, and last open list, initiated by Serge Claisse. No candidate will be elected at the first round of 9 March. In the second round, on 16 March, only two lists presented to the votes of the electors, those of Joseph Pluta and Corinne Gallerne, Serge Claisse has joined the list Gallerne between the two rounds. In the end, this is the list led by Joseph Pluta that has emerged carrying fourteen of the fifteen seats put in. Only Véronique Michotte was elected on the side of the list Gallerne.

== Places and monuments ==
- Hermitage in St. Walfroy founded by Walfroy Stylites the sixth century. It is a place of pilgrimage for Catholics. It is reached by a path consisting of fourteen stations of the cross. At the summit, 1,148 feet above sea level, one discovers a remarkable view of the pays d'Yvois.

The history of this site was hectic since its creation by St. Walfroy. After the death of the Stylite, other hermits continued his work. In 1237, the chapel was entrusted to the Abbey of Orval. In 1855, Thomas-Marie-Joseph Gousset, then Archbishop of Reims, bought the property, thanks to the generosity of the Diocese of Reims and neighboring dioceses, Namur and Verdun. He entrusted the house to the Abbot Rondeau, encouraged by Jean-Marie Vianney, whom he met during a visit to Ars. In 1868, the Vincentians made a house hermitage retreat.

In 1874 was built the Stations of the cross (restored in 1989) and then in 1880 the Chapel of Our Lady of Prompt Succour, (always located on the Plateau). 1906 saw the arrival of the canons of Bihéry et Couvert, diocesan missionaries. In 1920, they rebuild the buildings burned in 1916. In 1949, Canon Couvert rebuilt the chapel that was destroyed in 1940, he is the chaplain. In 1958, the Oblates of Mary Immaculate ensure the pilgrimage and service of neighboring parishes until 1980. In 1989, The Brothers of the Auxiliary Clergy arrive, and were installed on 10 September by Bishop Balland. In 2002, the Brothers of the Auxiliary Clergy left St. Walfroy. Since that date, the management has changed and the hermitage buildings have been renovated and adapted. The site has increased its hospitality vocation for groups (pension sessions for pilgrimage or spiritual stop individual home). The Hermitage now has 70 beds, 41 rooms, 21 with integrated health facilities and ten rooms for those with disabilities.

- Church of St. Walfroy. The church was rebuilt in 1957 (architect M. Poirier), while incorporating the apse of the old church. Its exterior shape reminds the pilgrim of a shelter-tent. The interior pillars and frames evoke the Ardennes forest. Above the door, a large canopy of Gaudin: it symbolizes the struggle between good and evil, of the faith against 'Idol Arduina, Marais' highest Church in the storm. It contains the tombstone of Canon Couvert. A broken slab is all that remains of the location of the tomb of St Walfroy, destroyed by war and lost.

== Population ==
Historical population
Year	Pop.	±% p.a.
1968	847	—
1975	809	−0.65%
1982	826	+0.30%
1990	819	−0.11%
1999	836	+0.23%
2007	790	−0.70%
2012	781	−0.23%
2017	770	−0.28%
2023	700	−1.58%
Source: INSEE

== See also ==
- Communes of the Ardennes department
