= Thibon =

Thibon is a surname. Notable people with the surname include:

- Gustave Thibon (1903–2001), French philosopher
- Louis Thibon (1866–1940), French civil servant (prefect)
