= Cuchery =

- Commune
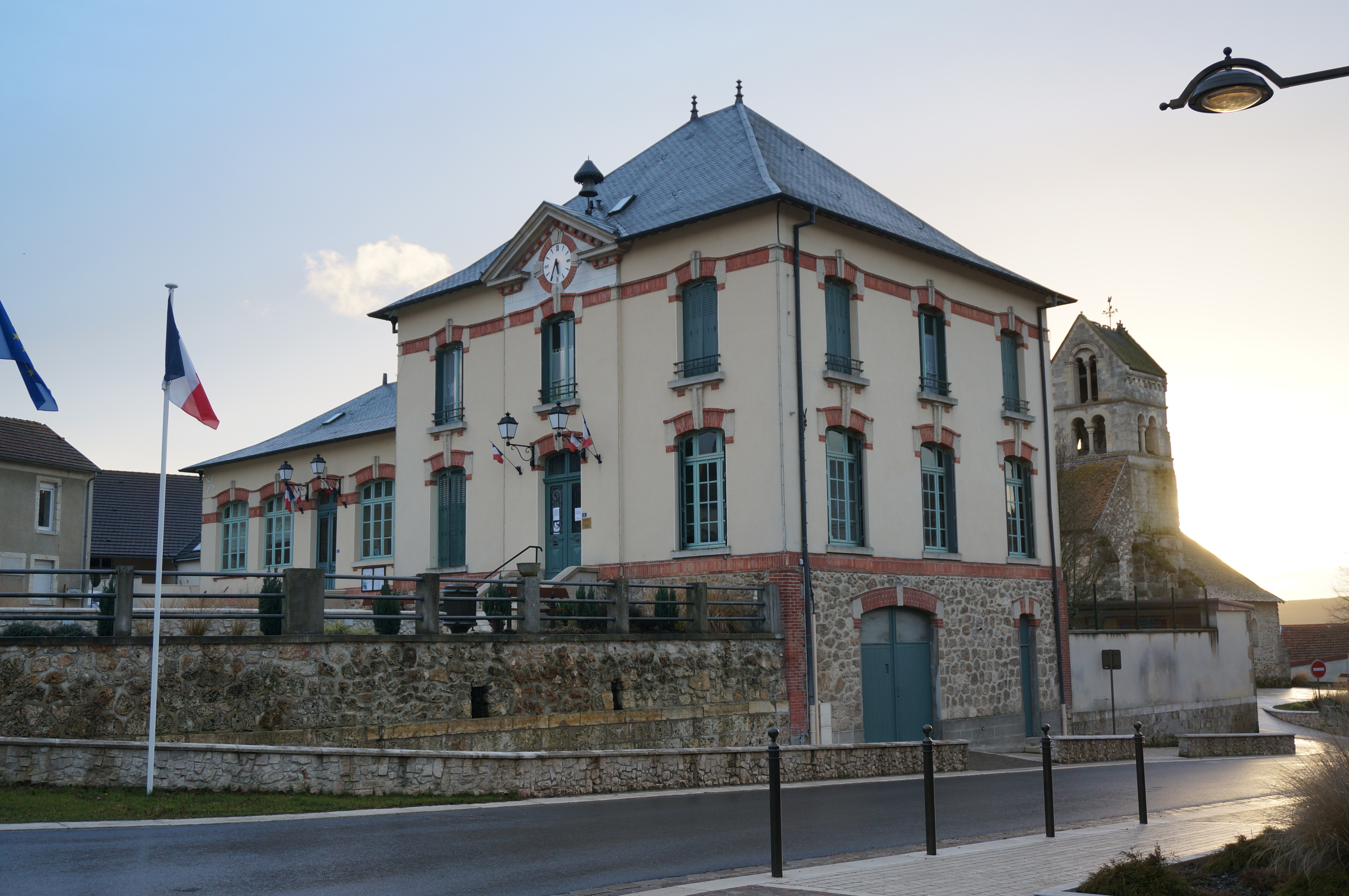
- The town hall in Cuchery

- Coat of arms
- Location of Cuchery
- Location within France Location within Grand Est
- Coordinates: 49°07′54″N 3°49′27″E
- Country: France
- Region: Grand Est
- Department: Marne
- Arrondissement: Épernay
- Canton: Dormans-Paysages de Champagne
- Intercommunality: Paysages de la Champagne

Government
  - Mayor (2020–2026): Cécile Oeslick
- Area^{1}: 7.03 km^{2} (2.71 sq mi)
- Elevation: 150 m (490 ft)
- Population (2023): 412
  - Density: 58.6/km^{2} (152/sq mi)
- Time zone: UTC+01:00 (CET)
  - Summer (DST): UTC+02:00 (CEST)
- INSEE/Postal code: 51199 /51480
- ^{1} French Land Register data, which excludes lakes, ponds, glaciers > 1 km^{2} (0.386 sq mi or 247 acres) and river estuaries.

Cuchery (French pronunciation: [kyʃʁi]) is a commune in the Marne department in north-eastern France.

== See also ==
- Communes of the Marne department
- Eugène Charles Miroy
- Montagne de Reims Regional Natural Park
