= Eugène Charles Miroy =

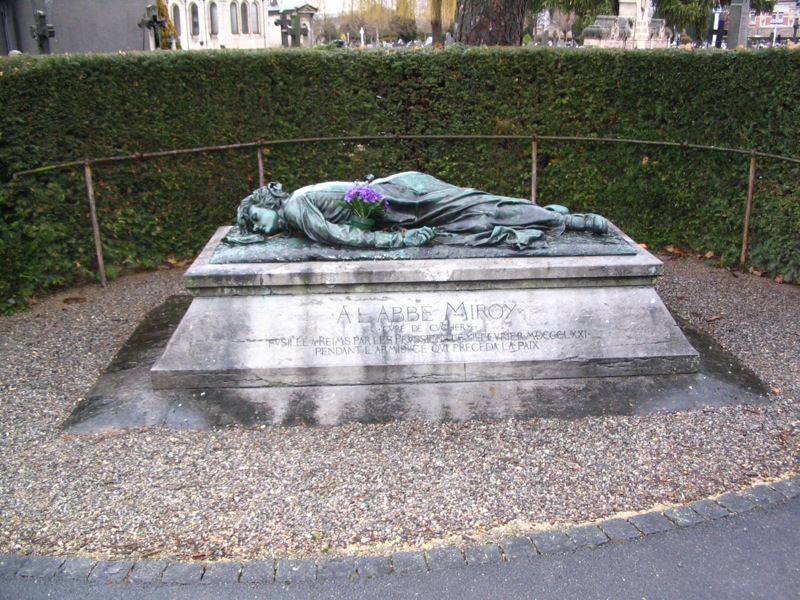
- The tomb of Abbé Miroy in the Cimitière du Nord, Reims, France.
- Born: November 24, 1828; Mouzon, Ardennes, France
- Died: February 12, 1871 (aged 42); Reims, Champagne-Ardenne, France
- Other names: Abbé Miroy
- Occupation: Priest

Eugène Charles Miroy (November 24, 1828 – February 12, 1871), also known as Abbé Miroy, was a French Catholic priest who was executed by the Prussian military during the armistice following the Franco-Prussian War.

Miroy was the Curate of Cuchery. Following the signature of the armistice agreement, Prussian forces accused Miroy of having sheltered Francs-tireurs in his rectory, and of having hidden armaments in the altar of his church.

Miroy is buried in the Cimitière du Nord in Reims, beneath a bronze recumbent statue sculpted by René de Saint-Marceaux. His tomb became a symbol of the French Resistance, and the municipality of Reims lays a wreath upon his grave at the annual commemoration of the liberation of the city.
