= Amblimont =

- Part of Mouzon
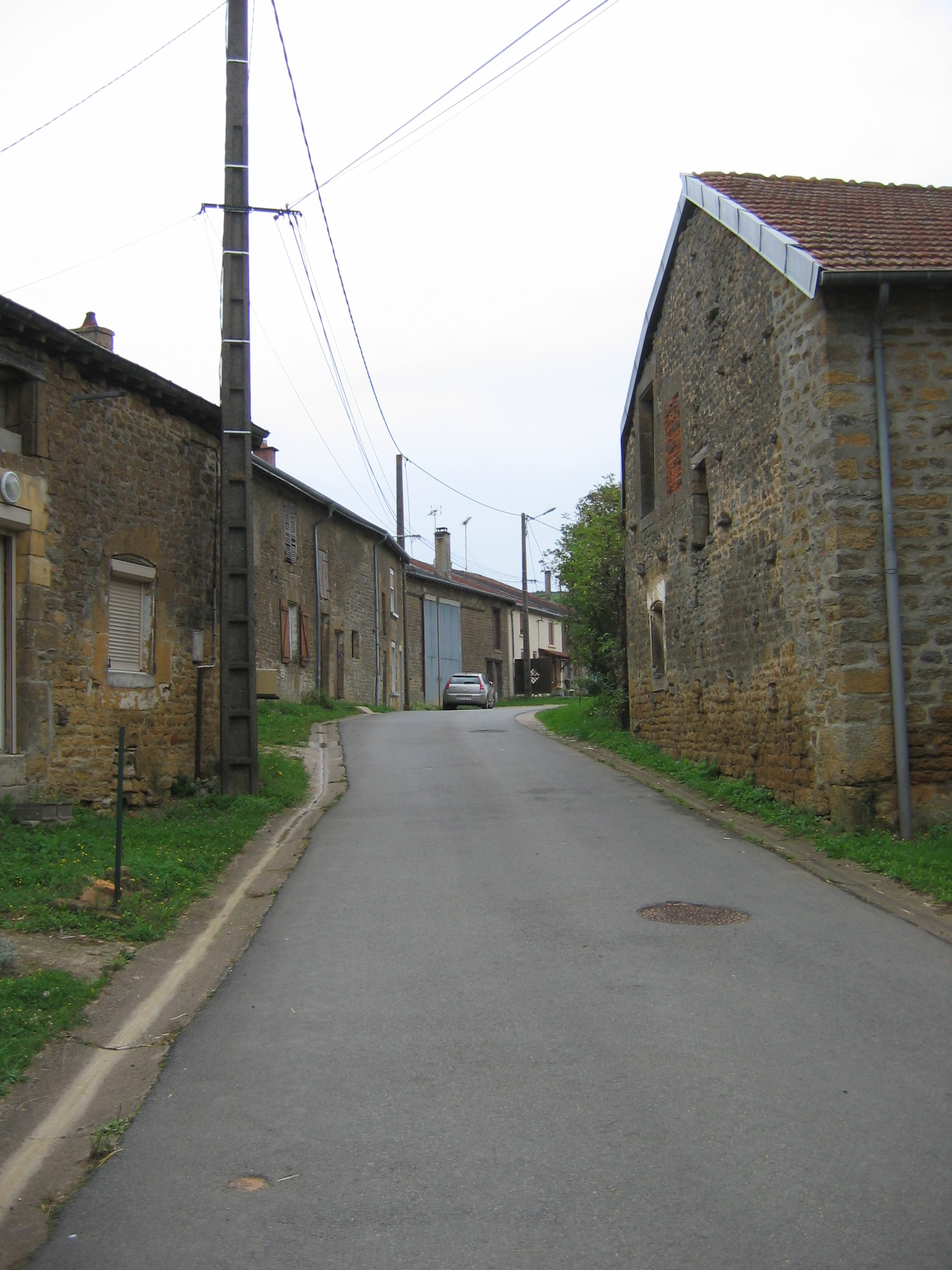
- Amblimont village

- Coat of arms
- Location of Amblimont
- Location within France Location within Grand Est
- Coordinates: 49°37′46″N 5°03′45″E
- Country: France
- Region: Grand Est
- Department: Ardennes
- Arrondissement: Sedan
- Canton: Carignan
- Commune: Mouzon
- Area^{1}: 7.4 km^{2} (2.9 sq mi)
- Elevation: 220 m (720 ft)
- Highest elevation: 342 m (1,122 ft)
- Lowest elevation: 154 m (505 ft)
- Population (2021): 212
  - Density: 29/km^{2} (74/sq mi)
- Time zone: UTC+01:00 (CET)
  - Summer (DST): UTC+02:00 (CEST)
- Postal code: 08210
- ^{1} French Land Register data, which excludes lakes, ponds, glaciers > 1 km^{2} (0.386 sq mi or 247 acres) and river estuaries.

Amblimont (French pronunciation: [ɑ̃blimɔ̃]) is a former commune in the Ardennes department in northern France. On 1 January 2016, it was merged into the commune Mouzon.

== Geography ==
Amblimont is located some 11 km south-east of Sedan and 5 km west of Carignan. It can be accessed by the D964 road from Mairy in the north passing through the mid-western part of the commune and continuing south to Mouzon. Access to the village is by the Ruelle de la Goutelle going south-east from the D964. The village can also be accessed by other local roads in the east of the commune. The commune is mostly farmland with patches of forest in the east.

The Ruisseau de la Vignette rises in the commune and flows west to the Canal de l'Est (North branch) which forms the western border of the commune. A few streams rise in the east of the commune and flow east to join the Chiers river.

=== Heraldry ===
Arms of Amblimont	The official status of the blazon remains to be determined. Blazon: Or, a tree of vert and a hillock the same on a party per fesse the same over a terrace in base wavy of 5 waves argent; in chief azure with three mullets argent.

== Administration ==
List of Successive Mayors

From	To	Name
2001	2008	Hervé Lardennois
2008	2014	Jean Gustin
2014	2016	Patricia Schneider

== Demography ==
The inhabitants of the commune are known as Amblimontais or Amblimontaises in French.

Historical population

Year	Pop.	±% p.a.
1793	303	—
1800	284	−0.92%
1806	296	+0.69%
1821	328	+0.69%
1831	361	+0.96%
1836	357	−0.22%
1841	350	−0.40%
1846	364	+0.79%
1851	358	−0.33%
1866	354	−0.07%
1872	348	−0.28%
1876	333	−1.10%
1881	289	−2.79%
1886	279	−0.70%
1891	279	+0.00%
1896	287	+0.57%

Year	Pop.	±% p.a.
1901	285	−0.14%
1906	230	−4.20%
1911	202	−2.56%
1921	179	−1.20%
1926	178	−0.11%
1931	178	+0.00%
1936	188	+1.10%
1946	169	−1.06%
1954	197	+1.93%
1962	179	−1.19%
1968	150	−2.90%
1975	163	+1.19%
1982	159	−0.35%
1990	164	+0.39%
1999	143	−1.51%
2021	212	+1.81%

Source: EHESS and INSEE

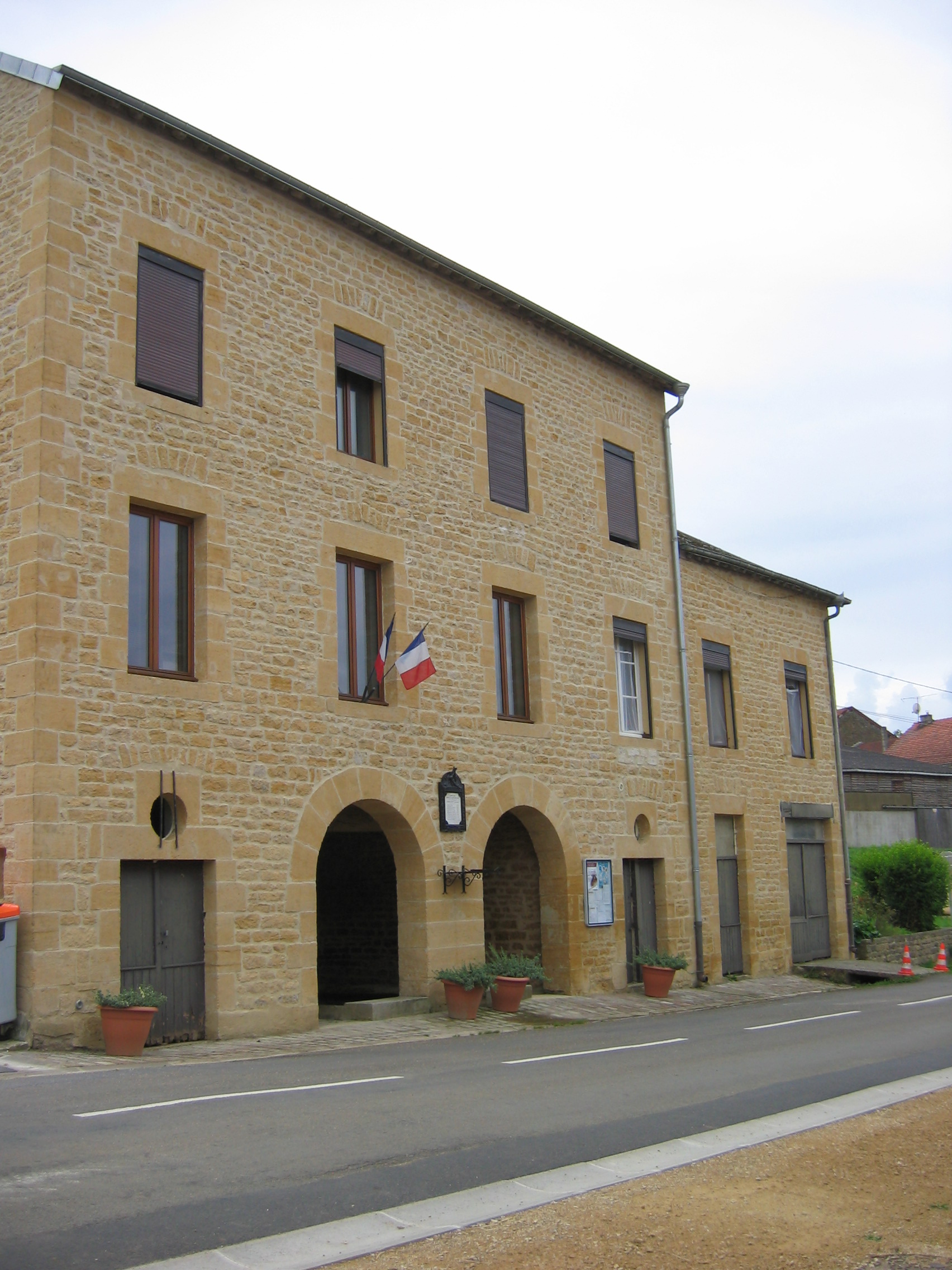
The Town Hall

== Culture and heritage ==
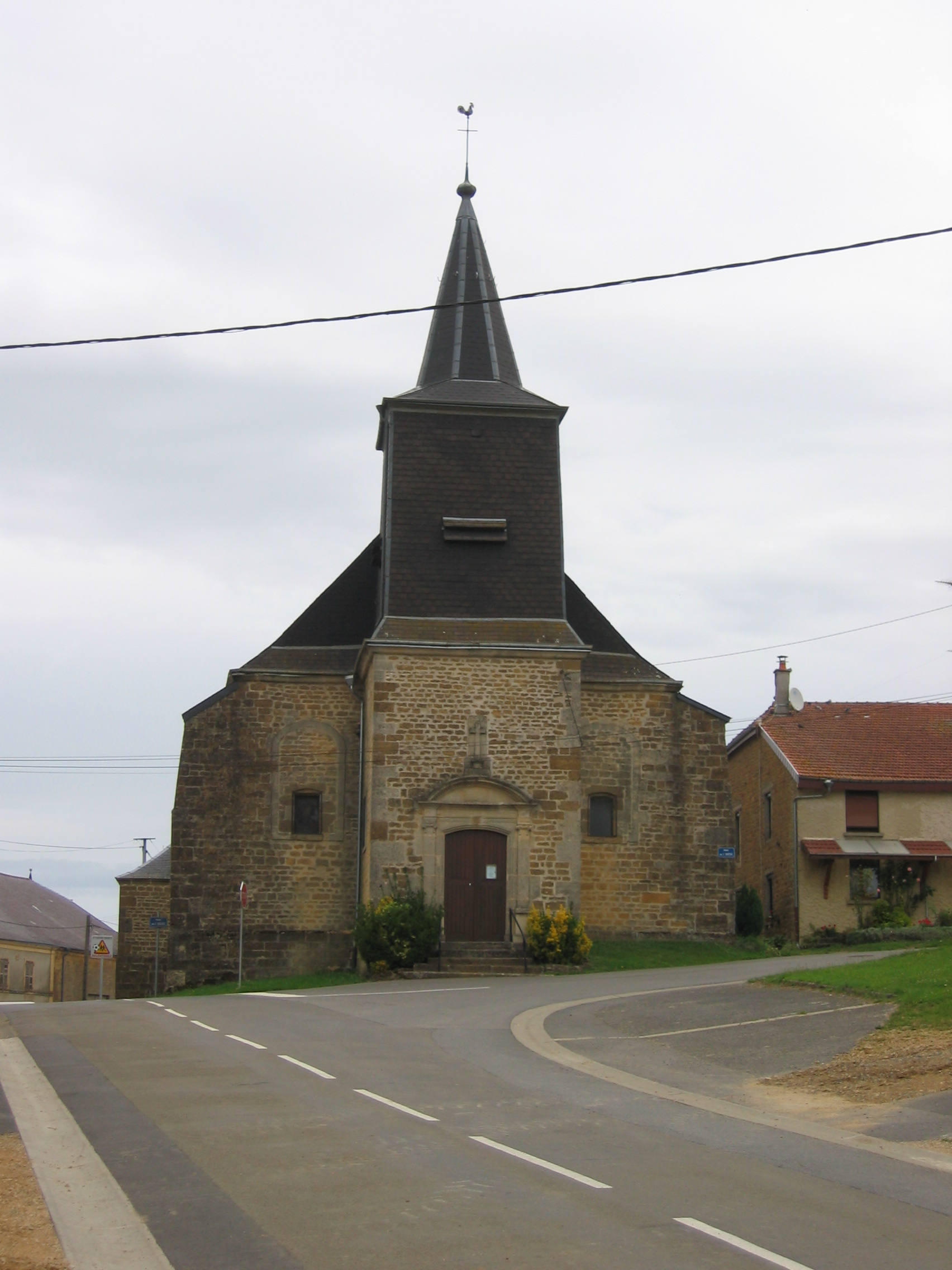
The Church of Saint-Georges

=== Religious heritage ===
The Church of Saint-Georges contains two items that are registered as historical objects:

- A Pulpit (18th century)
- An Altar, 2 Statues, Retable, Painting, Statuette: Saint Georges and Roch, Christ on the cross, and Virgin and child (18th century)

== See also ==
- Communes of the Ardennes department
