= Tremblois-lès-Carignan =

- Commune
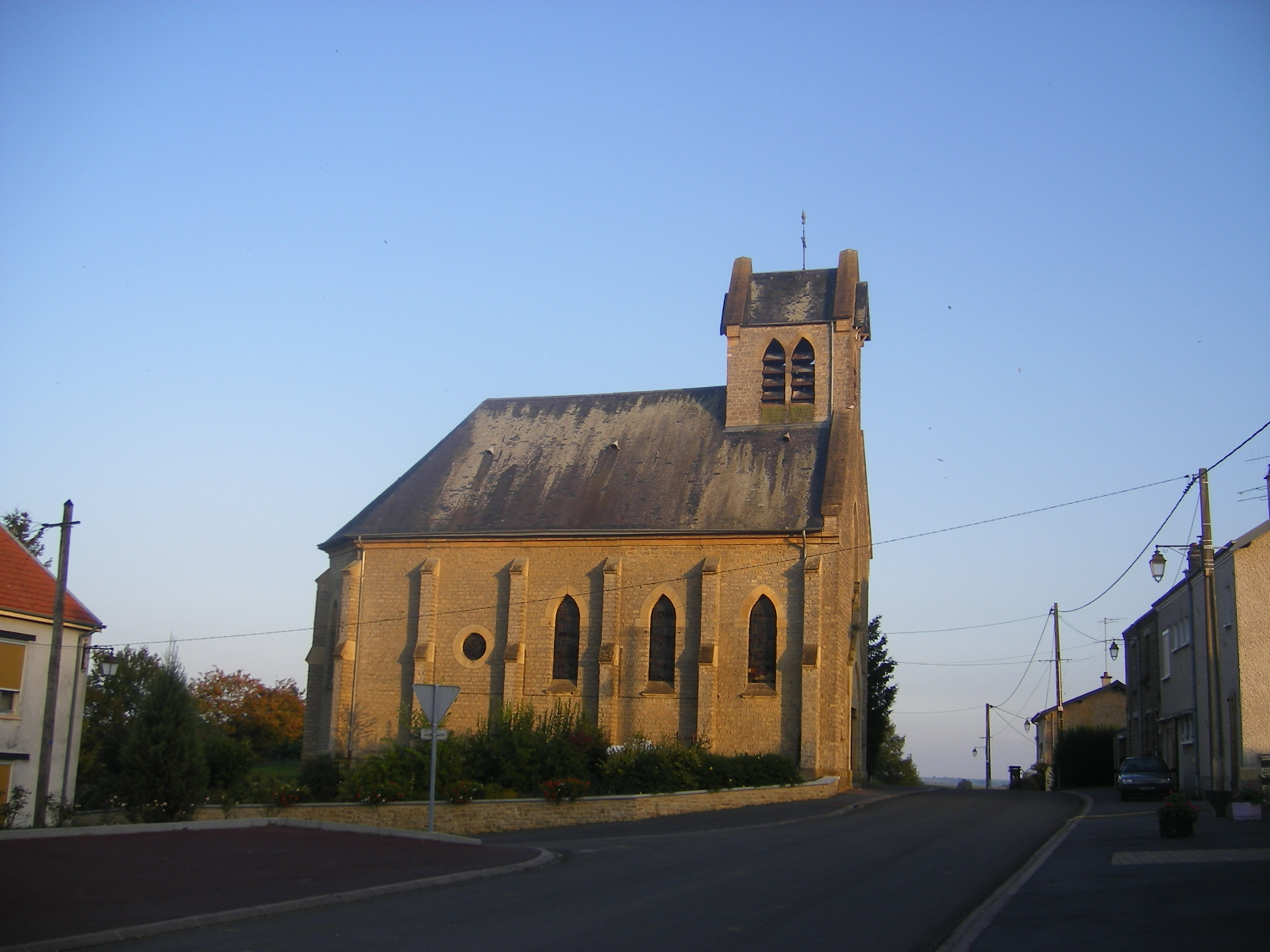
- The church in Tremblois-lès-Carignan

- Coat of arms
- Location of Tremblois-lès-Carignan
- Location within France Location within Grand Est
- Coordinates: 49°39′32″N 5°15′25″E
- Country: France
- Region: Grand Est
- Department: Ardennes
- Arrondissement: Sedan
- Canton: Carignan
- Intercommunality: Portes du Luxembourg

Government
  - Mayor (2020–2026): Jean-Pol Oury
- Area^{1}: 4.28 km^{2} (1.65 sq mi)
- Elevation: 270 m (890 ft)
- Population (2023): 132
  - Density: 30.8/km^{2} (79.9/sq mi)
- Time zone: UTC+01:00 (CET)
  - Summer (DST): UTC+02:00 (CEST)
- INSEE/Postal code: 08459 /08110
- ^{1} French Land Register data, which excludes lakes, ponds, glaciers > 1 km^{2} (0.386 sq mi or 247 acres) and river estuaries.

Tremblois-lès-Carignan (French pronunciation: [tʁɑ̃blwa lɛ kaʁiɲɑ̃], lit. 'Tremblois near Carignan') is a commune in the Ardennes department and Grand Est region of north-eastern France.

== Population ==
Historical population
Year	Pop.	±% p.a.
1968	122	—
1975	135	+1.46%
1982	126	−0.98%
1990	120	−0.61%
1999	125	+0.45%
2007	111	−1.47%
2012	115	+0.71%
2017	168	+7.88%
2023	132	−3.94%
Source: INSEE

== See also ==
- Communes of the Ardennes department
