= Signy-Montlibert =

- Commune
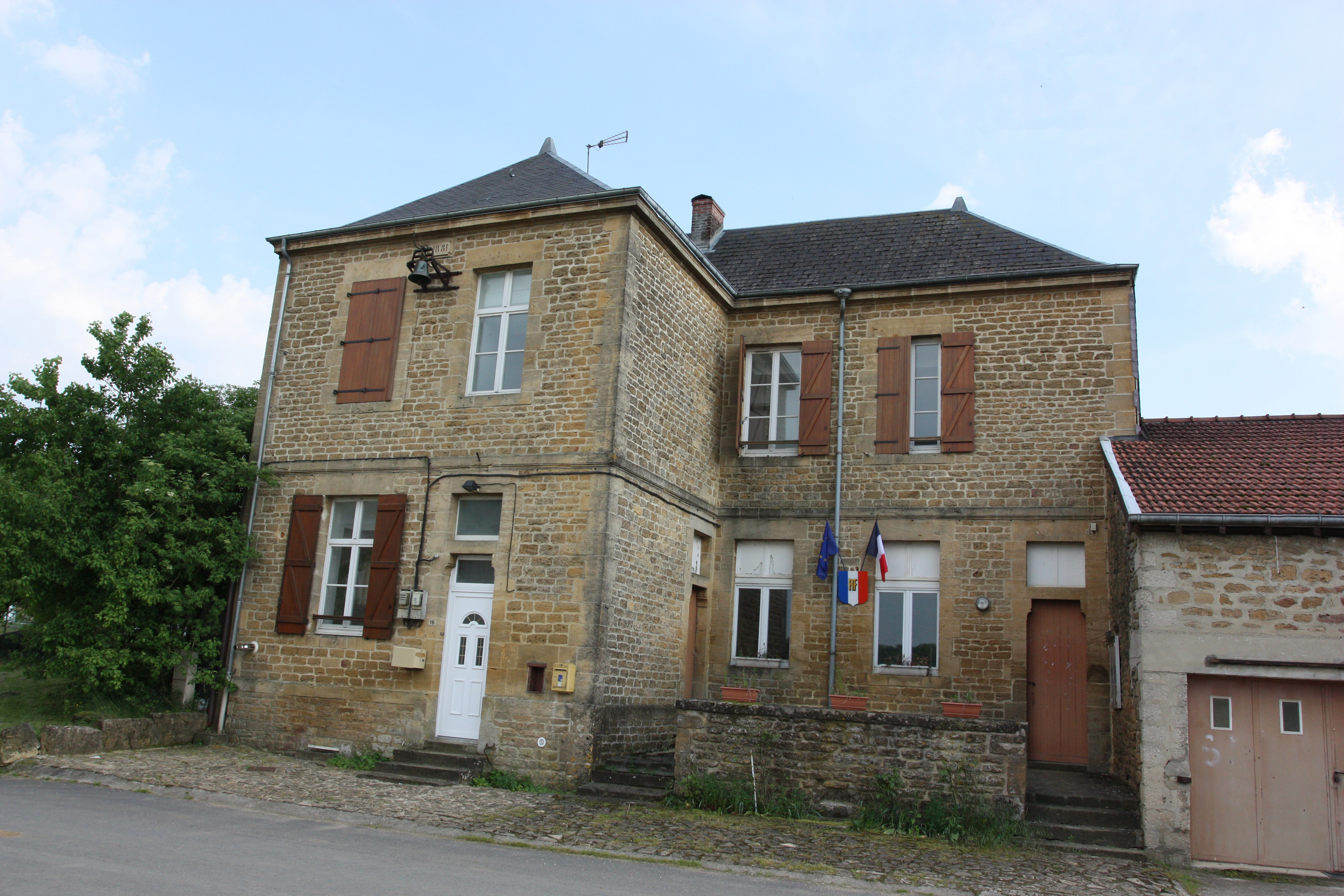
- The town hall in Signy-Montlibert

- Coat of arms
- Location of Signy-Montlibert
- Location within France Location within Grand Est
- Coordinates: 49°34′47″N 5°18′09″E
- Country: France
- Region: Grand Est
- Department: Ardennes
- Arrondissement: Sedan
- Canton: Carignan

Government
  - Mayor (2020–2026): Josée Lefebvre
- Area^{1}: 6.12 km^{2} (2.36 sq mi)
- Elevation: 194 m (636 ft)
- Population (2023): 93
  - Density: 15/km^{2} (39/sq mi)
- Time zone: UTC+01:00 (CET)
  - Summer (DST): UTC+02:00 (CEST)
- INSEE/Postal code: 08421 /08370
- ^{1} French Land Register data, which excludes lakes, ponds, glaciers > 1 km^{2} (0.386 sq mi or 247 acres) and river estuaries.

Signy-Montlibert (French pronunciation: [siɲi mɔ̃libɛʁ]) is a commune in the Ardennes department in northern France.

== Population ==
Historical population
Year	Pop.	±% p.a.
1968	142	—
1975	115	−2.97%
1982	112	−0.38%
1990	97	−1.78%
1999	87	−1.20%
2007	79	−1.20%
2012	88	+2.18%
2017	92	+0.89%
2023	93	+0.18%
Source: INSEE

== See also ==
- Communes of the Ardennes department
