= Mouzon, Ardennes =

Mouzon
- Commune
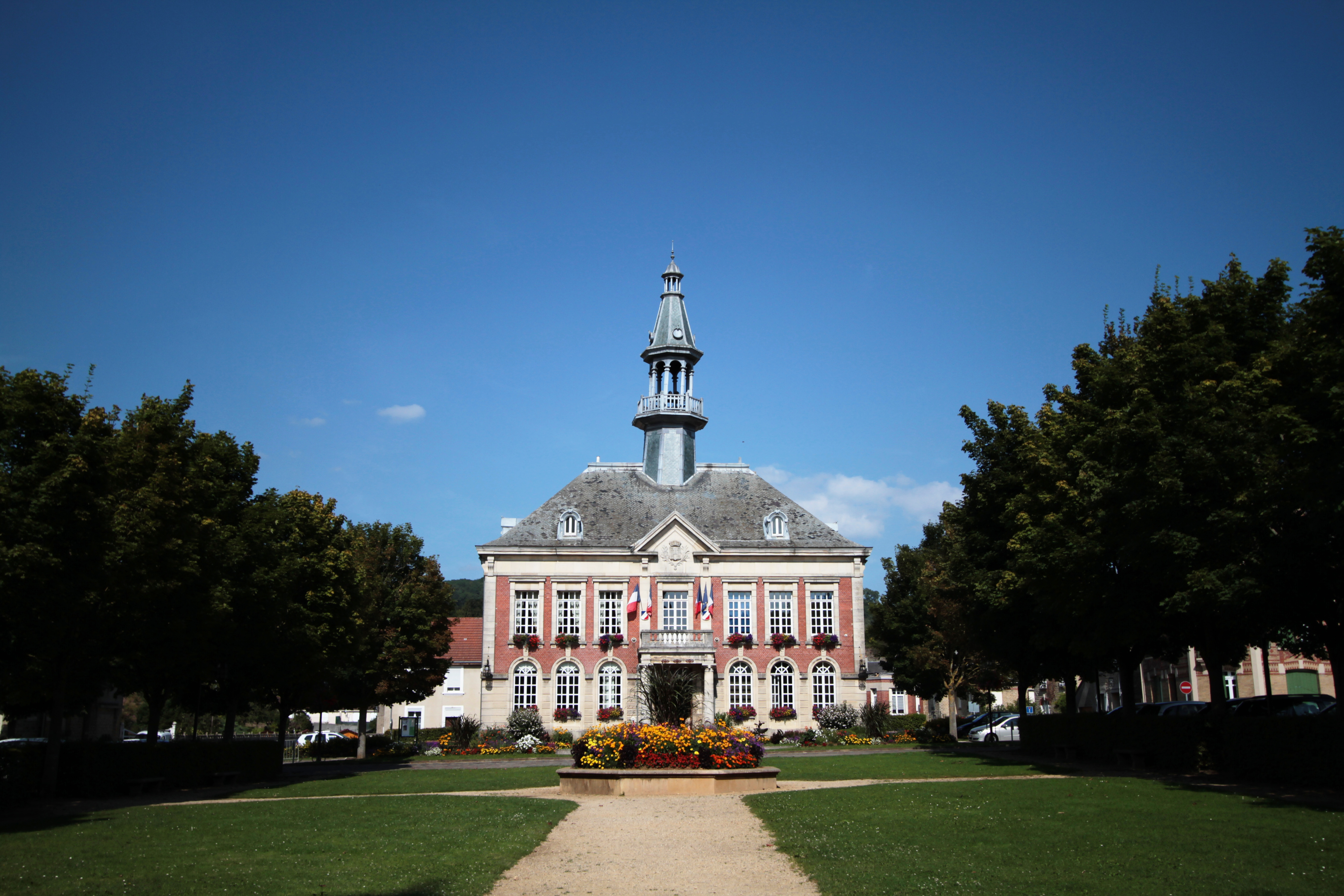
- The town hall in Mouzon

- Coat of arms
- Location of Mouzon
- Location within France Location within Grand Est
- Coordinates: 49°36′00″N 5°04′00″E
- Country: France
- Region: Grand Est
- Department: Ardennes
- Arrondissement: Sedan
- Canton: Carignan
- Intercommunality: Portes du Luxembourg

Government
  - Mayor (2020–2026): Alain Renard
- Area^{1}: 41.83 km^{2} (16.15 sq mi)
- Highest elevation: 333 m (1,093 ft)
- Lowest elevation: 154 m (505 ft)
- Population (2023): 2,229
  - Density: 53.29/km^{2} (138.0/sq mi)
- Time zone: UTC+01:00 (CET)
  - Summer (DST): UTC+02:00 (CEST)
- INSEE/Postal code: 08311 /08210
- ^{1} French Land Register data, which excludes lakes, ponds, glaciers > 1 km^{2} (0.386 sq mi or 247 acres) and river estuaries.

Mouzon (French pronunciation: [muzɔ̃]) is a commune in the Ardennes department in northern France. It is situated on the river Meuse. On 1 January 2016, the former commune Amblimont was merged into Mouzon.

== Population ==
The population data in the table and graph below refer to the commune of Mouzon proper, in its geography at the given years. The commune of Mouzon absorbed the former commune of Villemontry in 1965, and Amblimont in 2016.

Historical population

Year	Pop.	±% p.a.
1793	1,800	—
1800	2,152	+2.58%
1806	2,061	−0.72%
1821	2,263	+0.63%
1831	2,320	+0.25%
1836	2,528	+1.73%
1841	2,641	+0.88%
1846	2,388	−1.99%
1851	2,390	+0.02%
1866	2,288	−0.29%
1872	2,106	−1.37%
1876	1,985	−1.47%
1881	1,887	−1.01%
1886	1,846	−0.44%
1891	1,746	−1.11%
1896	1,750	+0.05%
1901	1,594	−1.85%
1906	1,726	+1.60%

Year	Pop.	±% p.a.
1911	1,702	−0.28%
1921	1,501	−1.25%
1926	1,783	+3.50%
1931	1,753	−0.34%
1936	1,834	+0.91%
1946	1,533	−1.78%
1954	2,057	+3.74%
1962	2,582	+2.88%
1968	3,272	+4.03%
1975	3,232	−0.18%
1982	2,986	−1.12%
1990	2,637	−1.54%
1999	2,616	−0.09%
2007	2,453	−0.80%
2012	2,245	−1.76%
2017	2,305	+0.53%
2023	2,229	−0.56%

Source: EHESS and INSEE (2007-2023)

== Notable people ==
- Eugène Charles Miroy (1828-1871), executed French Catholic priest
- Raymond Sommer (1906–1950), racing driver

== See also ==
- Communes of the Ardennes department
- Concordat of Worms
