= Raucourt-et-Flaba =

- Commune
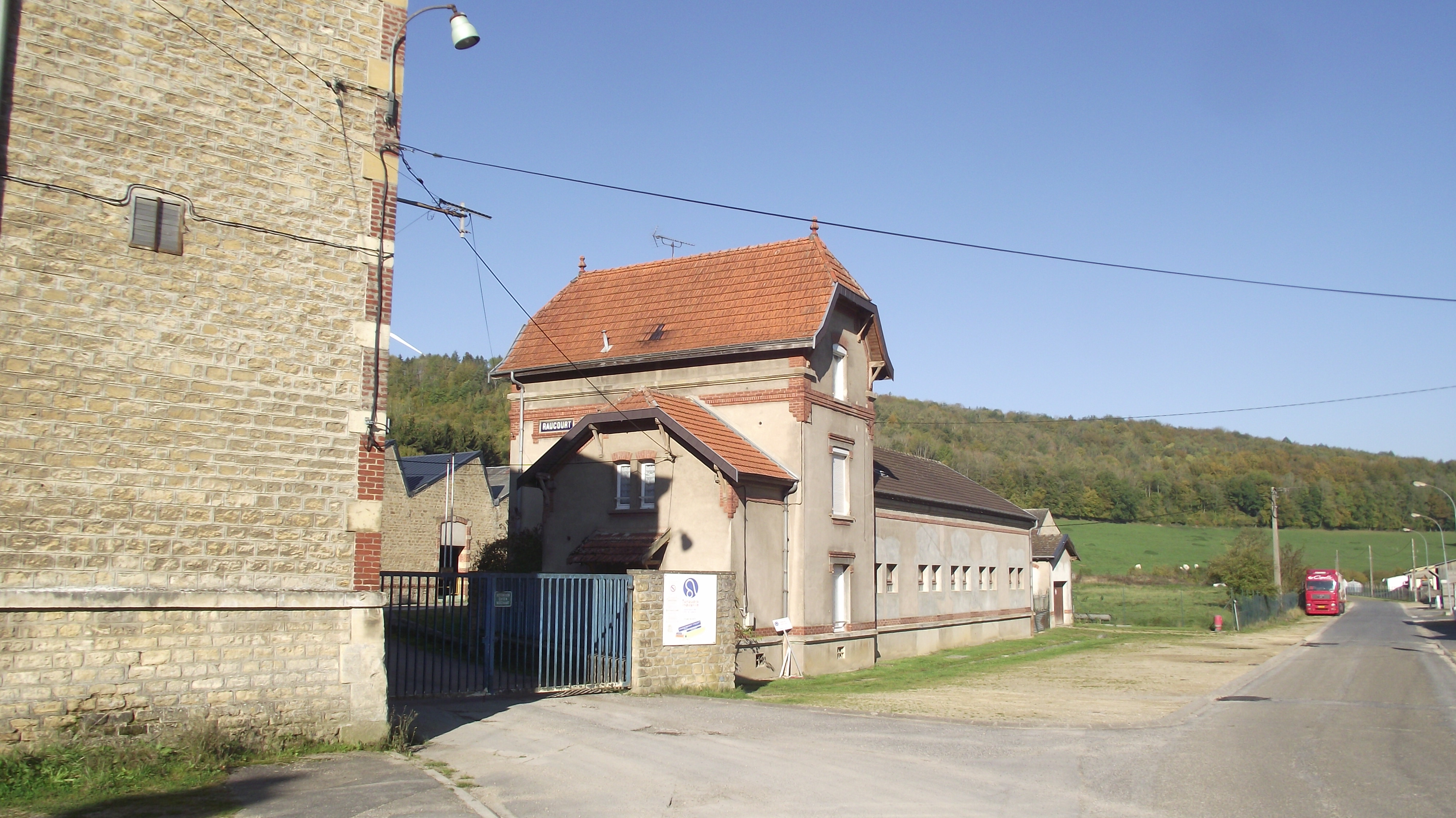
- Train station

- Coat of arms
- Location of Raucourt-et-Flaba
- Location within France Location within Grand Est
- Coordinates: 49°36′11″N 4°57′29″E
- Country: France
- Region: Grand Est
- Department: Ardennes
- Arrondissement: Sedan
- Canton: Vouziers

Government
  - Mayor (2020–2026): Véronique Duru
- Area^{1}: 21.83 km^{2} (8.43 sq mi)
- Elevation: 180 m (590 ft)
- Highest elevation: 320 m (1,050 ft)
- Lowest elevation: 177 m (581 ft)
- Population (2023): 813
  - Density: 37.2/km^{2} (96.5/sq mi)
- Time zone: UTC+01:00 (CET)
  - Summer (DST): UTC+02:00 (CEST)
- INSEE/Postal code: 08354 /08450
- ^{1} French Land Register data, which excludes lakes, ponds, glaciers > 1 km^{2} (0.386 sq mi or 247 acres) and river estuaries.

Raucourt-et-Flaba (French pronunciation: [ʁokuʁ e flaba]) is a commune in the Ardennes department in northern France.

Nichée au cœur des Ardennes, à quelques kilomètres de Sedan, Raucourt-et-Flaba est une commune à taille humaine qui compte près de 850 habitants. Née de la fusion des villages de Raucourt et de Flaba en 1828, elle possède un riche patrimoine historique, notamment marqué par les événements de 1870, tout en offrant aujourd'hui un cadre de vie dynamique, convivial et accueillant.

Située dans la région Grand Est, au sein de la vallée de l'Ennemane, la commune s'étend sur 21,8 km² à une altitude moyenne de 190 mètres. Son environnement naturel, composé de forêts, de prairies et de paysages préservés, en fait un lieu privilégié pour les promenades, les activités de plein air et les moments de détente.

Malgré son caractère rural, Raucourt-et-Flaba bénéficie d'une situation géographique avantageuse. La commune se trouve à seulement 11 kilomètres de Sedan, à proximité de la frontière belge, et est entourée des villages de Haraucourt, Maisoncelle-et-Villers et Bulson. Elle appartient au canton de Vouziers ainsi qu'à la Communauté de communes des Portes du Luxembourg.

Raucourt-et-Flaba est reconnue pour sa qualité de vie. Son tissu associatif dynamique, ses animations tout au long de l'année et l'esprit de solidarité qui anime ses habitants contribuent à créer une ambiance chaleureuse et conviviale. Résidents, nouveaux arrivants et visiteurs y trouvent un cadre agréable ainsi que les services essentiels du quotidien.

Entre patrimoine, nature et dynamisme local, Raucourt-et-Flaba incarne tout le charme d'un village ardennais où il fait bon vivre, se retrouver et construire l'avenir.

== Population ==
Historical population
Year	Pop.	±% p.a.
1968	1,196	—
1975	1,102	−1.16%
1982	973	−1.76%
1990	923	−0.66%
1999	906	−0.21%
2007	873	−0.46%
2012	864	−0.21%
2017	841	−0.54%
2023	813	−0.56%
Source: INSEE

== See also ==
- Communes of the Ardennes department
