= La Ferté-sur-Chiers =

- Commune
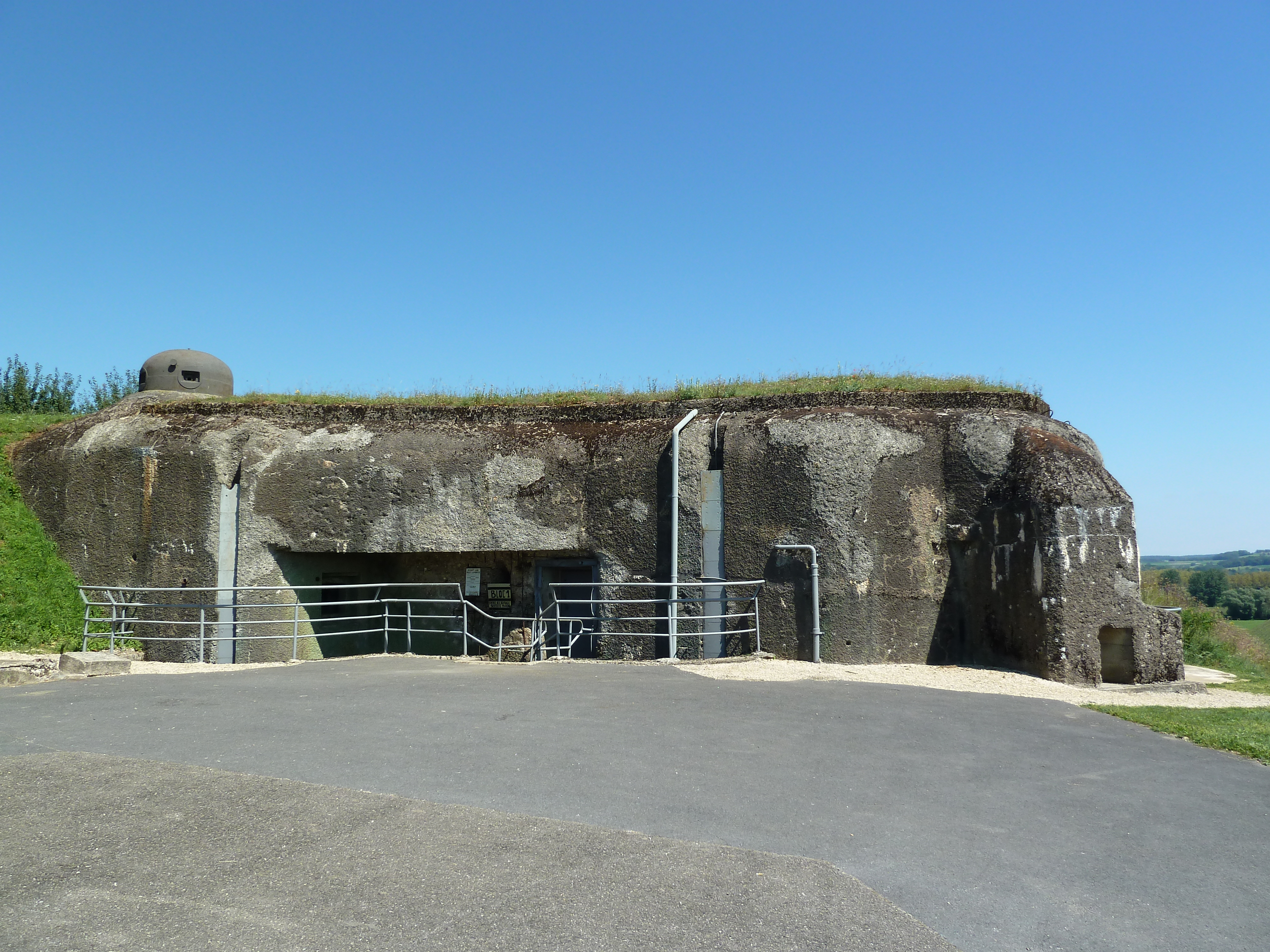
- Fortifications

- Coat of arms
- Location of La Ferté-sur-Chiers
- Location within France Location within Grand Est
- Coordinates: 49°34′32″N 5°14′34″E
- Country: France
- Region: Grand Est
- Department: Ardennes
- Arrondissement: Sedan
- Canton: Carignan
- Intercommunality: Portes du Luxembourg

Government
  - Mayor (2020–2026): Etienne Malcuit
- Area^{1}: 6.41 km^{2} (2.47 sq mi)
- Elevation: 170 m (560 ft)
- Population (2023): 173
  - Density: 27.0/km^{2} (69.9/sq mi)
- Time zone: UTC+01:00 (CET)
  - Summer (DST): UTC+02:00 (CEST)
- INSEE/Postal code: 08168 /08370
- ^{1} French Land Register data, which excludes lakes, ponds, glaciers > 1 km^{2} (0.386 sq mi or 247 acres) and river estuaries.

La Ferté-sur-Chiers (French pronunciation: [la fɛʁte syʁ ʃjɛʁ], literally La Ferté on Chiers, before 1959: La Ferté) is a commune in the Ardennes department in northern France.

== Population ==
Historical population
Year	Pop.	±% p.a.
1968	268	—
1975	252	−0.88%
1982	245	−0.40%
1990	202	−2.38%
1999	224	+1.16%
2007	189	−2.10%
2012	177	−1.30%
2017	172	−0.57%
2023	173	+0.10%
Source: INSEE

== See also ==
- Communes of the Ardennes department
