= Beaumont-en-Argonne =

- Commune
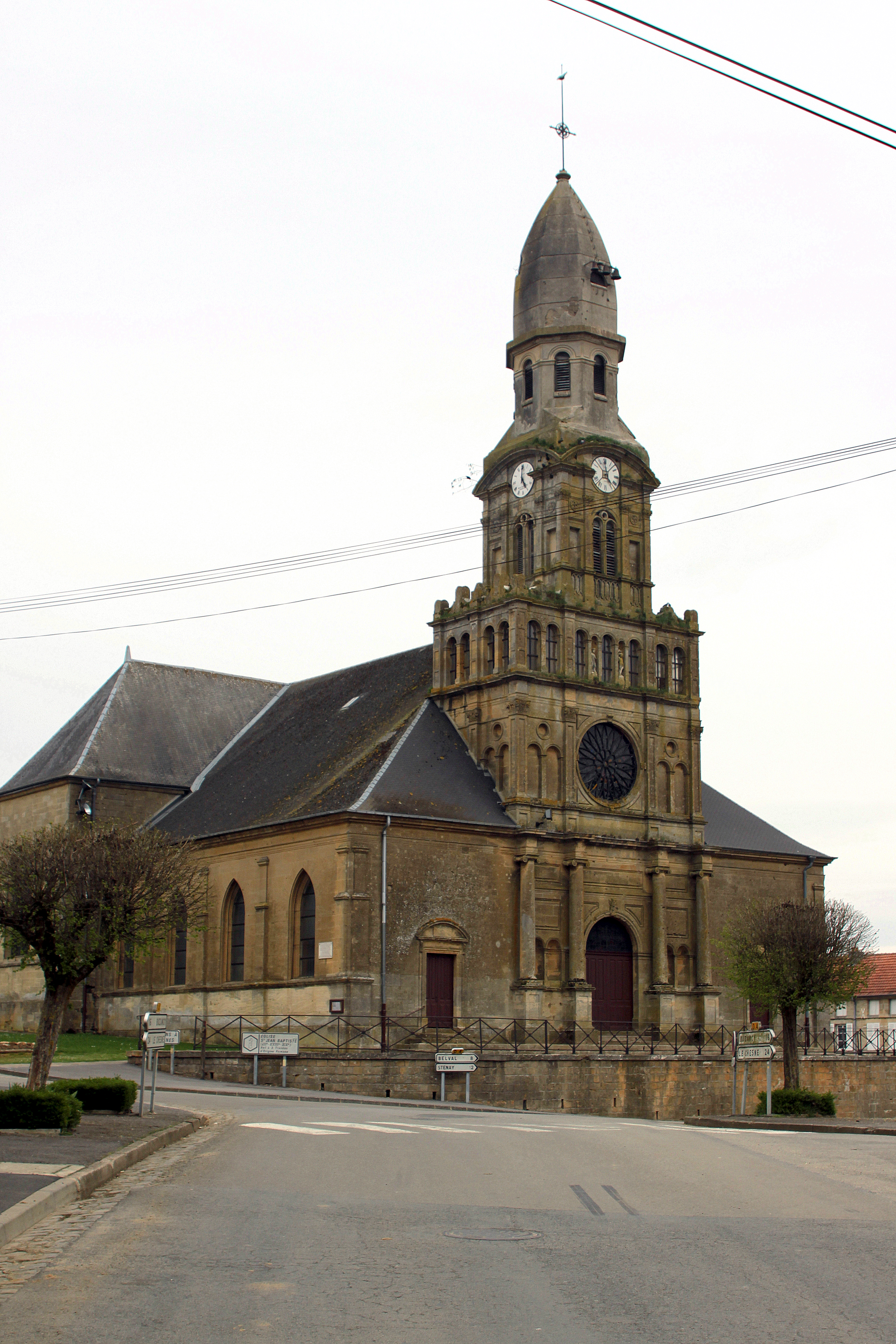
- The church in Beaumont-en-Argonne

- Coat of arms
- Location of Beaumont-en-Argonne
- Location within France Location within Grand Est
- Coordinates: 49°32′21″N 5°03′29″E
- Country: France
- Region: Grand Est
- Department: Ardennes
- Arrondissement: Sedan
- Canton: Carignan

Government
  - Mayor (2020–2026): Francis Chaumont
- Area^{1}: 31.05 km^{2} (11.99 sq mi)
- Elevation: 160 m (520 ft)
- Highest elevation: 287 m (942 ft)
- Lowest elevation: 162 m (531 ft)
- Population (2023): 415
  - Density: 13.4/km^{2} (34.6/sq mi)
- Time zone: UTC+01:00 (CET)
  - Summer (DST): UTC+02:00 (CEST)
- INSEE/Postal code: 08055 /08210
- ^{1} French Land Register data, which excludes lakes, ponds, glaciers > 1 km^{2} (0.386 sq mi or 247 acres) and river estuaries.

Beaumont-en-Argonne (French pronunciation: [bomɔ̃ ɑ̃.n‿aʁɡɔn], literally Beaumont in Argonne) is a commune in the Ardennes department in northern France.

== Population ==
Historical population
Year	Pop.	±% p.a.
1968	568	—
1975	548	−0.51%
1982	526	−0.58%
1990	490	−0.88%
1999	433	−1.36%
2007	449	+0.45%
2012	459	+0.44%
2017	430	−1.30%
2023	415	−0.59%
Source: INSEE

== See also ==
- Communes of the Ardennes department
