= Louis Thibon =

French prefect

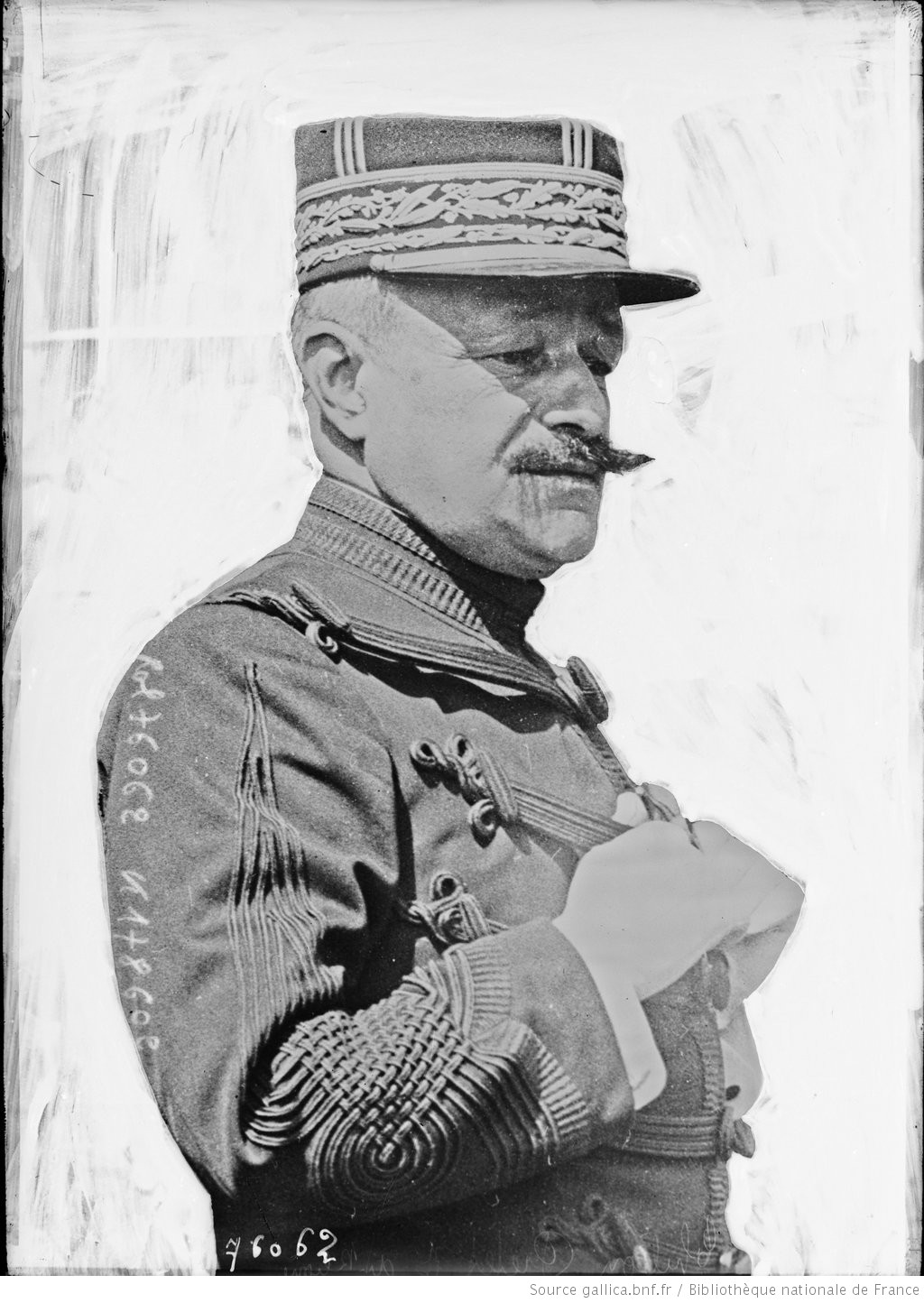
- 1922
- Born: 16 April 1866; Vienne, Isère, France
- Died: 23 October 1940 (aged 74); Marseille, Bouches-du-Rhône, France
- Other names: Charles, Louis Thibon
- Occupation: French prefect

Signature
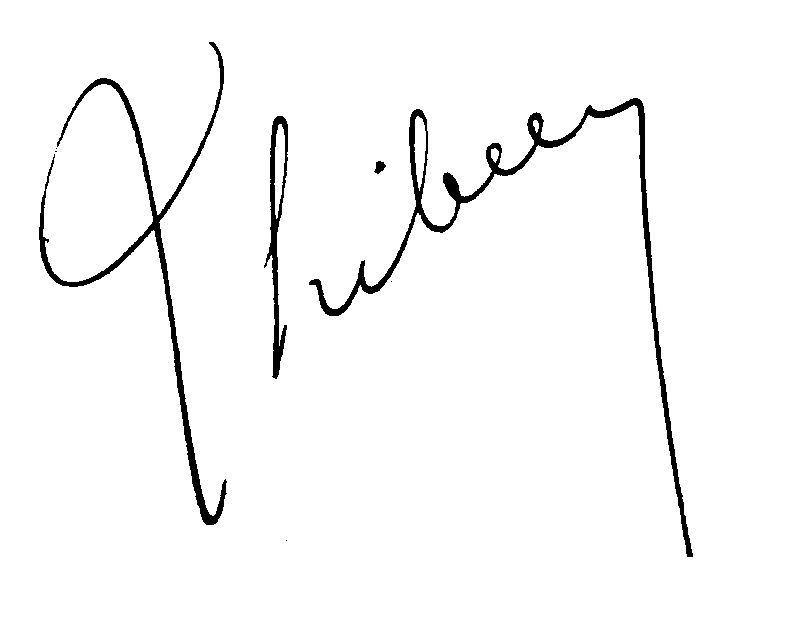

Louis Thibon (1866–1940) was prefect during the French Third Republic (1870–1940).

== Personal life and education ==
Louis Thibon or Louis Charles Thibon or Charles, Louis Thibon was born on 16 April 1866 in Vienne, Isère and died on 23 October 1940 in Marseille, Bouches-du-Rhône.

He was licencié en droit (licenciate in law).

When he was chef de cabinet of Jean Antoine Blanc, prefect of Landes he married his daughter Marie Andrée Blanc on 4 October 1893 in Mont-de-Marsan (Landes).

== Career ==
- Chef de cabinet of the prefect of Hautes-Alpes in Gap City (20 December 1889)
- Chef de cabinet of the prefect of Landes in Mont-de-Marsan City (1 January 1893)
- Secretary General (secrétaire général de préfecture) of Landes in Mont-de-Marsan City (16 August 1993)
- Sub-prefect of Saint-Sever — the arrondissement of Saint-Sever was suppressed in 1926 — (Landes) in Saint-Sever City (10 April 1894)
- Sub-prefect of Vouziers (Ardennes) in Vouziers City (21 October 1898)
- Sub-prefect of Montélimar — the arrondissement of Montélimar was suppressed in 1926 — (Drôme) in Montélimar City (24 September 1900)
- Sub-prefect of Sedan (Ardennes) in Sedan City (2 April 1904)
- Prefect of Ariège in Foix City (10 June 1909)
- Prefect of Ardèche in Privas City (19 October 1909)
- Prefect of Corsica in Ajaccio City (2 March 1912)
- Prefect of Finistère in Brest City (31 December 1913)
- Prefect of Gard in Nîmes City (8 May 1917)
- Prefect of Marne in Châlons-sur-Marne City now Châlons-en-Champagne City (20 February 1919)
- Prefect (interim) of Bouches-du-Rhône in Marseille City (5 August 1919)
- Prefect of Bouches-du-Rhône in Marseille City (15 January 1920)
- En disponibilité (prefect paid for doing nothing) (30 January 1925)
- Pensioner, préfet honoraire (28 January 1926)

== Prefect of Bouches-du-Rhône ==
On the occasion of the Colonial Exposition in Marseille in 1922 Thibon became commandeur of the Légion d’honneur.

The first Armenian refugees in Marseille received some help. For instance, the prefect’s wife Marie-Andrée Thibon née Blanc created an association for the refugees coming from Smyrna (at the time of the Great Fire of Smyrna) and originating from French Mandate for Syria and the Lebanon.

But 10,885 Armenian refugees reached in Marseille from August to December 1923 (4,700 during October 1923 only).

Also in 1923, Thibon lamented about Armenian refugees in Marseille, the “continual arrival of these orientals”.

== Honours and awards ==
Chevalier (Knight) (30 January 1913), officier (Officer) (21 April 1919), commandeur (Commander) (12 August 1923) of Légion d’honneur.

== Sources, Notes, References ==
- (in French) "Thibon (Louis, Charles)" (1866-1940), pages 519-520 in René Bargeton, préfet honoraire, Dictionnaire biographique des préfets (septembre 1870-mai 1982), Paris, Archives nationales, 555 pages, 26 cm, ISBN 2-86000-232-4 .
- (in French) "Thibon (Louis, Charles)" (1866-1940), page 489 in Archives nationales (France) (répertoire nominatif par Christiane Lamoussière, revu et complété par Patrick Laharie; répertoire territorial et introduction par Patrick Laharie), Le Personnel de l’administration préfectorale, 1881-1926, Paris : Centre historique des Archives nationales, 2001, 774 pages, 27 cm, ISBN 2-86000-290-1.
- Mary Dewhurst Lewis, "The Strangeness of Foreigners: Policing Migration and Nation in Interwar Marseille", French Politics, Culture & Society, Volume 20, Number 3, Fall 2002, pages 65-96, (http://www.ingentaconnect.com/content/berghahn/fpcs/2002/00000020/00000003/art00005); read http://scholar.harvard.edu/mlewis/files/strangeness_foreigners.pdf page 74
- Mary Dewhurst Lewis, The boundaries of the republic: migrant rights and the limits of universalism in France, 1918-1940, Stanford, California : Stanford University Press, 2007, XV pages and 361 pages, 24 cm, ISBN 978-0-8047-5582-5, ISBN 978-0-8047-5722-5, SUDOC : https://www.sudoc.fr/120527537, passim
  - (in French) Translation into French : Mary D. Lewis, Les frontières de la République : immigration et limites de l’universalisme en France, 1918-1940, translated from French by Françoise Jaouën, Marseille, Agone, printed in 2010, 425 pages and XX pages, 21 cm, ISBN 978-2-7489-0127-6 .
- (in French) https://www.culture.gouv.fr/LH/LH271/PG/FRDAFAN83_OL2646038V001.htm : Archives of Legion d’honneur

== See also ==
- Colonial exhibitions
- Armenians in France

Louis Thibon French Prefect Born: 1866
Political offices
Preceded by	Prefect of Ariège; 1909–1909	Succeeded by
Preceded by	Prefect of Ardèche; 1909–1912	Succeeded by
Preceded by	Prefect of Corsica; 1912–1913	Succeeded by
Preceded by	Prefect of Finistère; 1913–1917	Succeeded by
Preceded by Pierre Emery	Prefect of Gard; 1917–1919	Succeeded by Victor Gilotte
Preceded by	Prefect of Marne; 1919–1919	Succeeded by
Preceded by Lucien Saint	Prefect of Bouches-du-Rhône; 1919–1925	Succeeded by Hilaire Delfini
