= Semois Valley National Park =

National park in Belgium

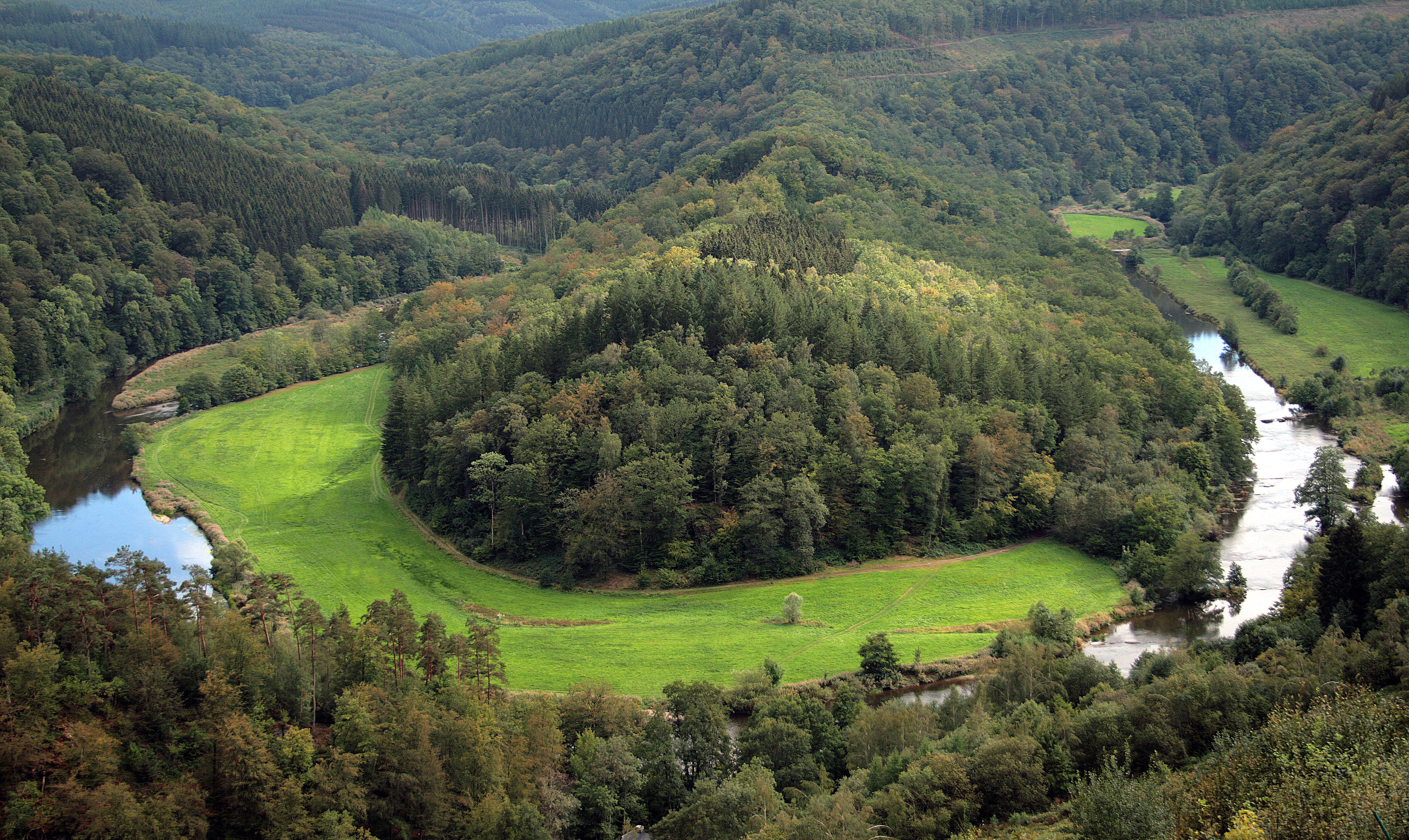
- Tombeau du Géant, a hill surrounded by the Semois river in the park

- Location within Belgium Location within Europe
- Location: Wallonia, Belgium
- Coordinates: 49°47′32″N 05°13′58″E
- Area: 28,903 ha (71,420 acres)
- Established: 2022
- Governing body: Semois Valley National Park Foundation
- Website: https://www.semois-parcnational.be/en

The Semois Valley National Park (French: Parc national Vallée de la Semois, Dutch: Nationaal Park Vallée de la Semois) is a national park in Wallonia, Belgium. It is one of two national parks in Wallonia. Established in 2022 with the dual purpose of protecting nature within the park and develop sustainable tourism, the park has a total area of 28,903 hectares (289.03 km^{2}; 71,420 acres) and extends across the Belgian provinces of Namur and Luxembourg.

== History and governance ==
The national park was established by a decision of the government of Wallonia on 9 December 2022. The National Park Entre-Sambre-et-Meuse was established at the same time; the two were chosen among four possible locations for new national parks. In August 2022, the Gaume Natural Park and the Southern Ardennes Natural Park formed a partnership with the Belgian branch of the World Wide Fund for Nature at Herbeumont Castle to launch the candidacy. The two nature parks form the core of the new national park.

The decision was accompanied by a funding scheme of 18 million euros, aimed to support the management of the new park but also restoration projects and the establishment of new facilities. A large part of the funding was supplied via the Recovery and Resilience Facility, part of the Next Generation EU, a European Union-wide economic recovery plan following the COVID-19 pandemic.

The total area of the national park is 28,903 hectares (289.03 km^{2}; 71,420 acres), centred around 167 kilometres (104 miles) of waterway of the Semois river, and includes 690 kilometres (430 miles) of tributaries. It extends across eight municipalities within the two Belgian provinces of Namur and Luxembourg. Around 54 percent of the area designated as national park also enjoys various degrees of formal protected status; this includes ten Natura 2000 sites that form part of a wider network across the European Union. The Region of Wallonia states that the national park complies with the International Union for Conservation of Nature definition and standards concerning national parks.

Semois Valley National Park takes the legal form of a foundation, the Semois Valley National Park Foundation. A board of directors meet twice a year; its tasks includes monitoring financial matters and the work of the executive committee, which in turn is in charge of the continuous operating of the park. The organisation also involves a regional coalition, a scientific committee, and a citizens' committee.

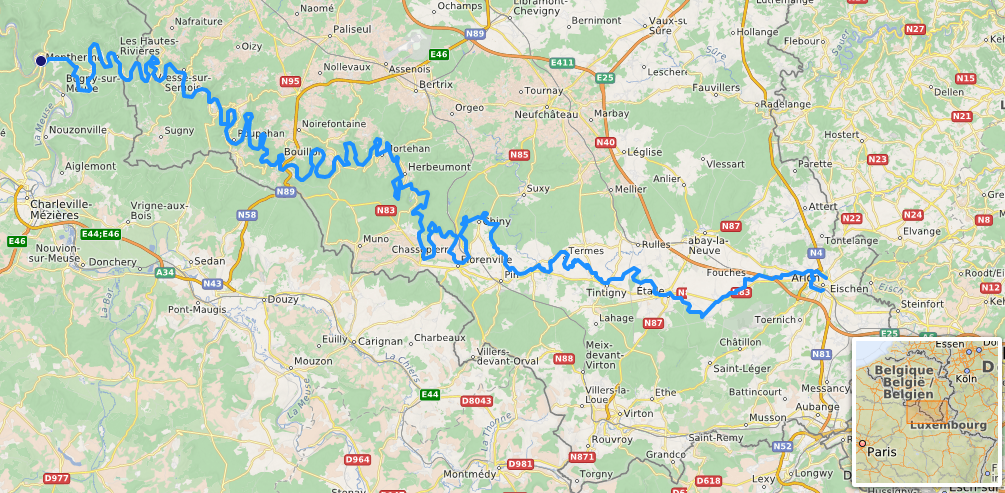
The Semois river. Around 167 kilometres (104 miles) of its course forms the core of the national park.

== Nature protection and ecology ==
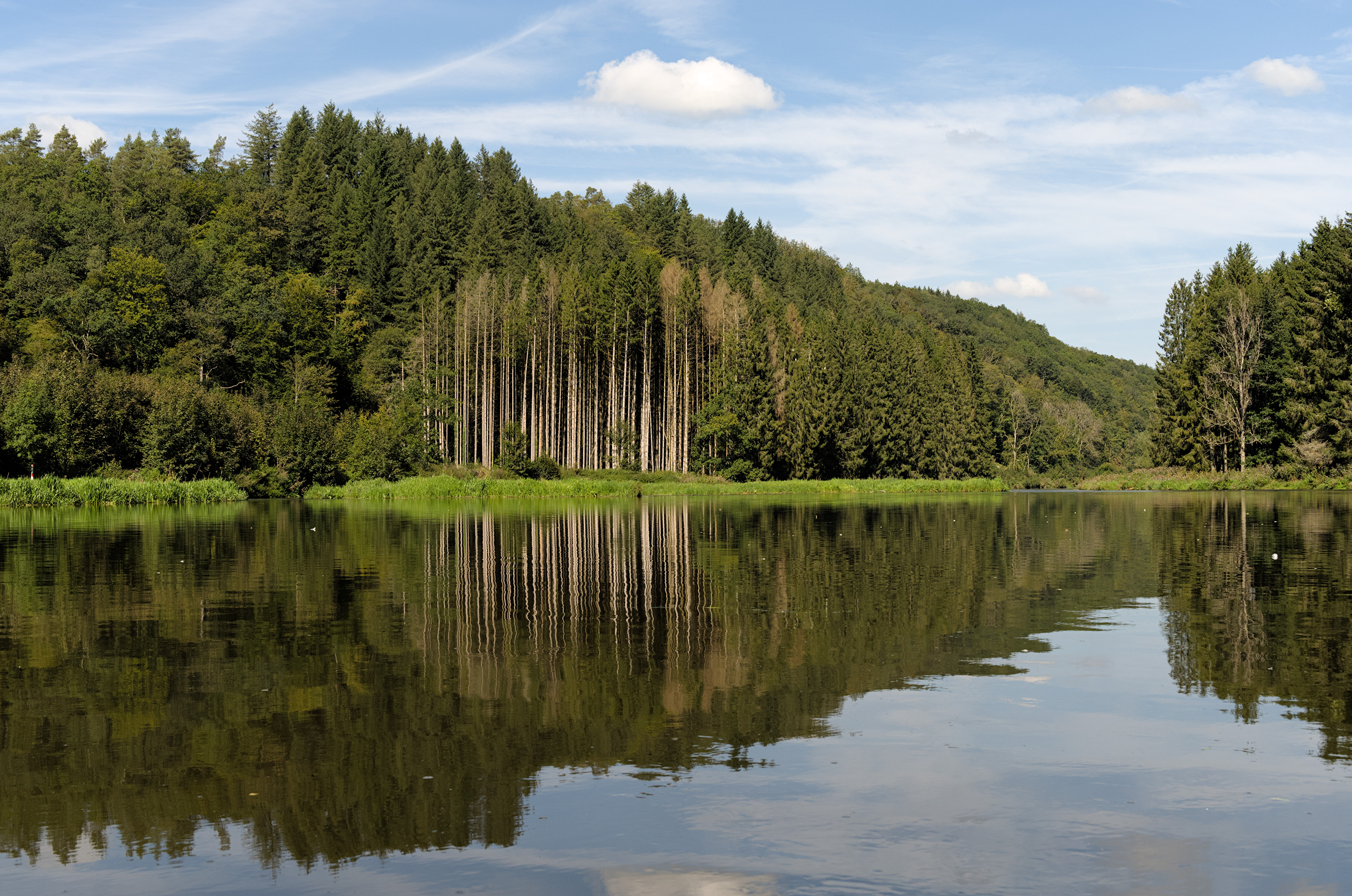
Wooded banks of the Semois river in the municipality of Bouillon within the national park

One of the main aims of the park is to protect the natural environment of the area. The area of the national park is heavily forested: over 60 percent of the area is covered in old-growth forest, and in total over 80 percent is covered by forest. Together with the National Park Entre-Sambre-et-Meuse it constitutes one of the largest contiguous forested areas of Western Europe. The park however encompasses several important habitats in addition, including unique former industrial areas such as abandoned quarries, and four wetlands considered of biological importance.

The area is estimated to contain 65 percent of the species of breeding birds present in Wallonia, and similarly 46 percent of bee species and 77 percent of butterfly species found in Wallonia. Two thirds of dragonfly species known to exist in Wallonia, and 20 of 24 recorded bat species are also reported to exist in the park. Approximately 20 percent of all bee species found in Europe can be found in the Semois Valley National Park. A total of 19 species of mammals have also been reported, including sightings of a lynx.

Actions reported by the national park aimed at supporting nature and biodiversity includes inventorying species, restoring and maintaining important biotopes, and combatting light pollution and invasive species. The World Wide Fund for Nature has been operating a programme to improve conditions for otters in the area since before the national park was established.

== Heritage ==
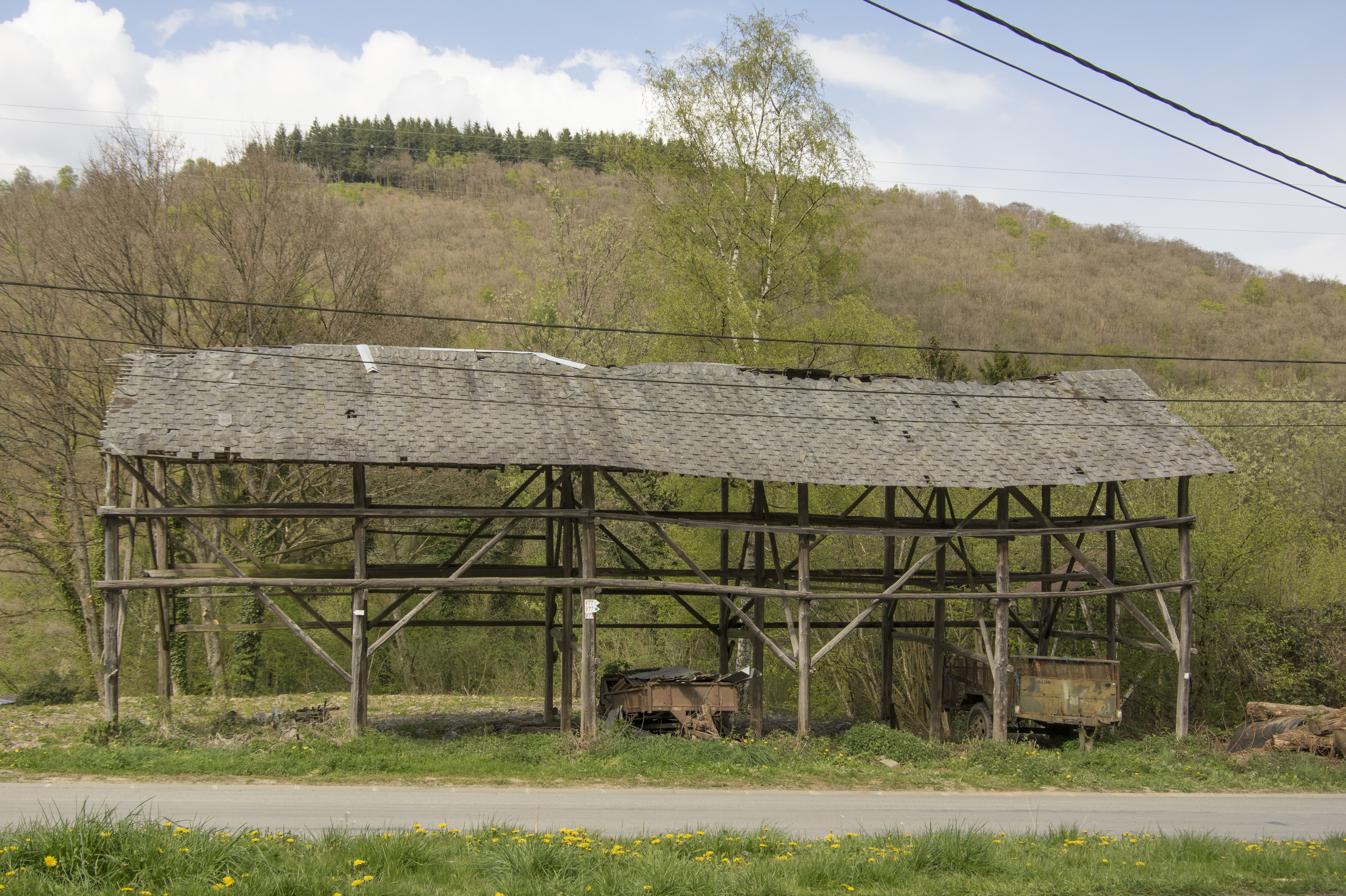
A shed for drying tobacco in the Semois river valley. Traditional ways of cultivating tobacco is part of the intangible cultural heritage that the national park aims to showcase.

The national park also aims to support and sustain both the built and the intangible cultural heritage of the area. The national park contains the castles of Bouillon and Herbeumont and several further registered heritage sites, in addition to more than ten archaeological sites and smaller examples of built heritage such as wayside shrines. Concerning the intangible cultural heritage of the area, such as folklore and traditional skills, the park also aims to showcase these through various activities. For example, traditional ways of cultivating tobacco have been practiced in the valley since the 16th century, but has today largely disappeared. This has left behind a legacy in the form of for example sheds for drying tobacco, which are being repurposed and restored.

== Tourism ==
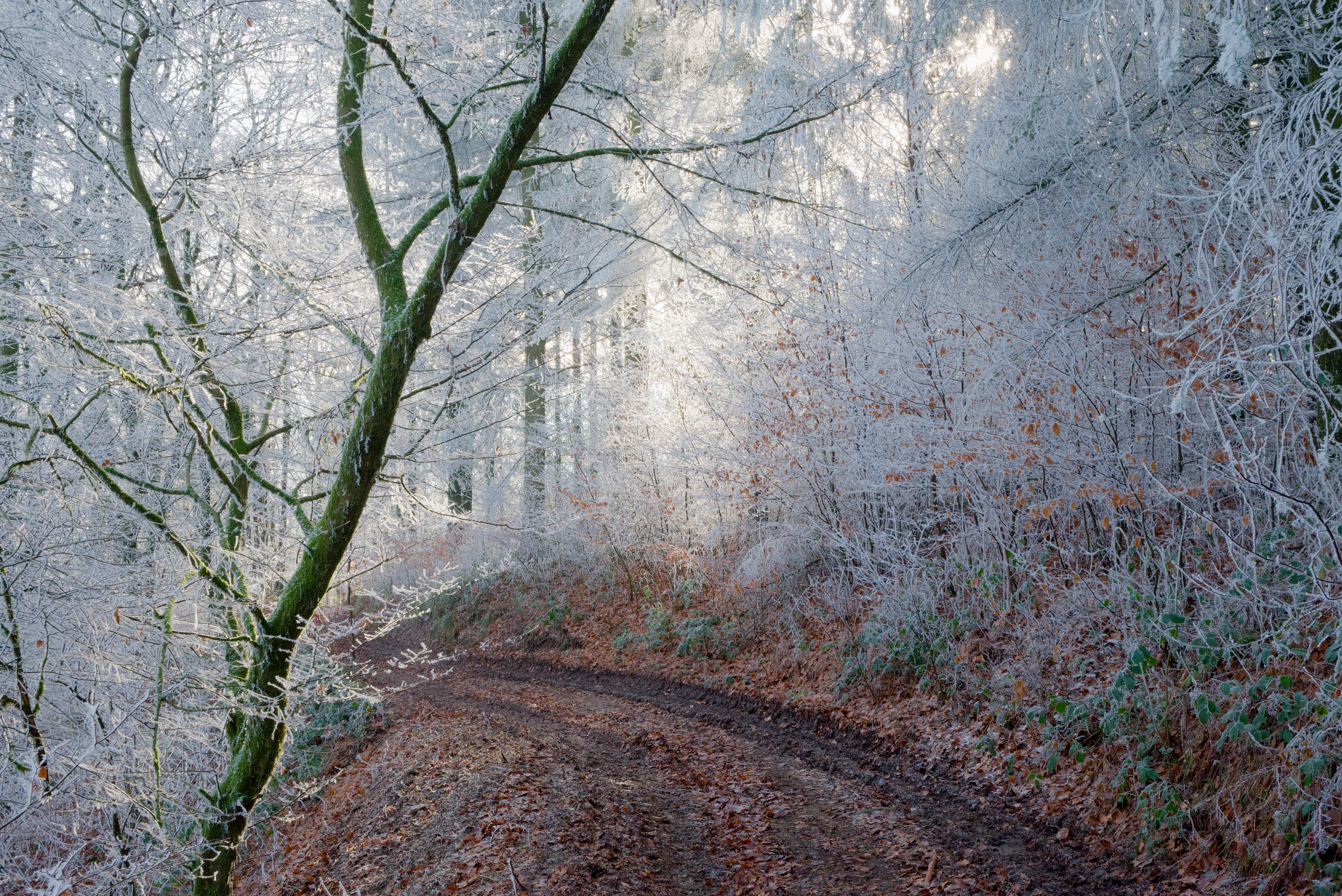
A section of the GR footpath GR 16 within the park during winter

With the establishment of the park, efforts have also been made to improve the accessibility of the area to tourism. One of the main purposes of the park is to develop sustainable tourism. This includes the creation of entry points, new river crossings, pedagogic and thematic trails, camping grounds, posts from which to observe wildlife, panoramic viewpoints and projects to make it easier to go around on horseback and bicycle, as well as the training of local guides. The GR footpath GR 16 passes through the national park. By one estimate, up to 100,000 more visitors annually could be expected after the establishment of the area as a national park, pointing to challenges in integrating greater visitor flows while maintaining ecological protection and not creating undue weight for local communities.

== See also ==
- List of protected areas of Belgium
