= Dohan (disambiguation) =

Dohan is a village in the municipality of Bouillon, Belgium.

Dohan may also refer to:

- Dohan river, river in Rajasthan and Haryana, India
- Edith Hall Dohan (1877-1943), American archaeologist
- Meital Dohan, Israeli actress
- F. Curtis Dohan, American physician
