= List of protected areas of Belgium =

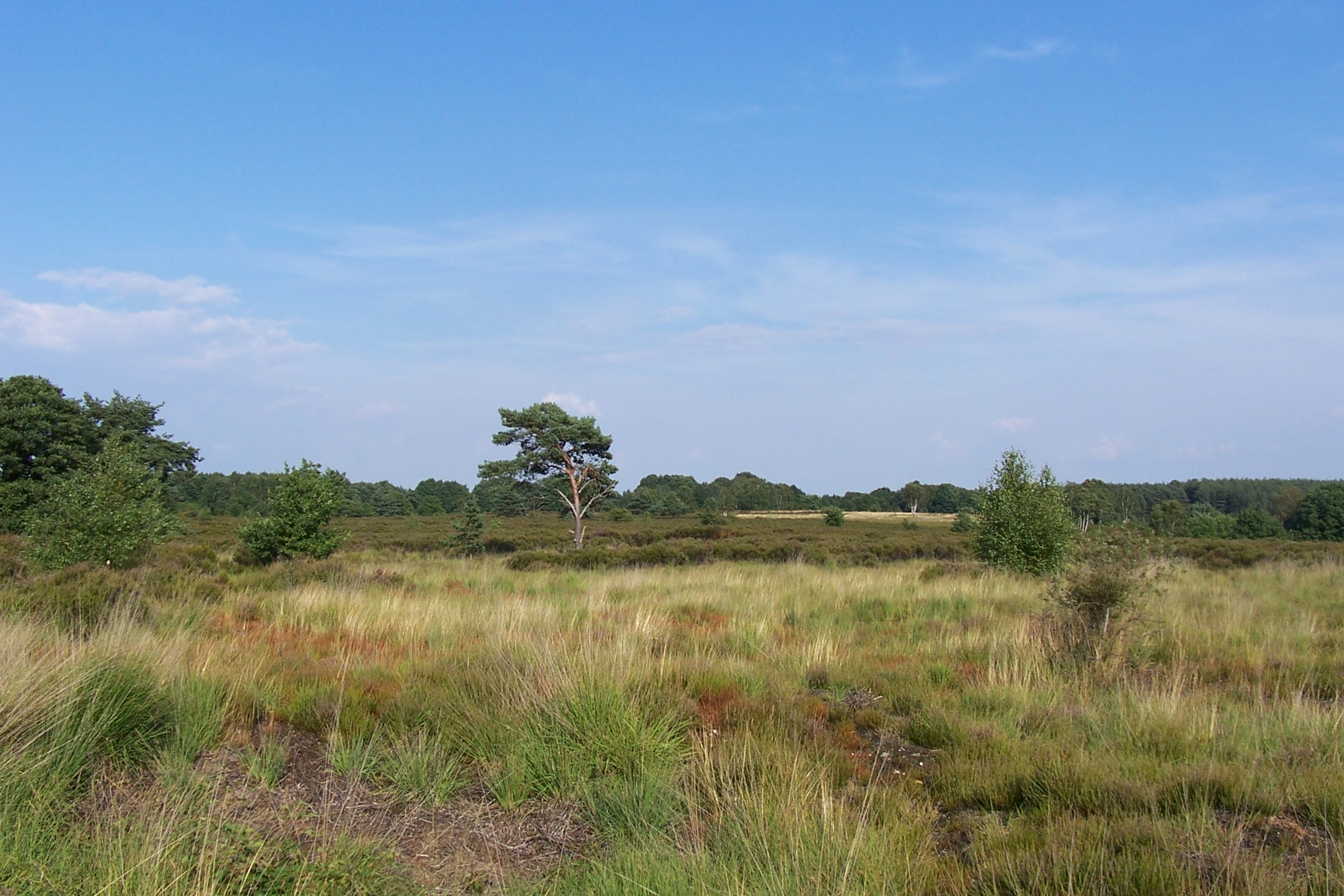
Heathland at the Hoge Kempen National Park

There are numerous protected areas in Belgium with a wide variety of types, protection levels and sizes. The below list gives an overview of the most important protected areas.

== National parks ==
As of 2025, there are six national parks in Belgium. In 2022 two national parks were designated in Wallonia: Parc National de L'Entre-Sambre-et-Meuse and Parc National de la Vallée de la Semois. In 2023 three national parks were designated in Flanders: Nationaal Park Scheldevallei, Nationaal Park Bosland and Nationaal Park Brabantse Wouden. The De Zoom–Kalmthoutse Heide Cross-Border Park is partly situated in Belgium, but is designated as a national park only in the Netherlands.

Photo	Name	Founded in	Area (km^{2})
	Hoge Kempen National Park	2006	127
	National Park Entre-Sambre-et-Meuse	2022	221.29
	Semois Valley National Park	2022	290
	Brabantse Wouden National Park	2023	
	Scheldevallei National Park	2023	
	Bosland National Park	2023	

== Natural parks ==
There are many natural parks in Belgium, including 9 in Wallonia (called Parcs Naturels).

Photo	Name	Founded in	Area (km^{2})	Comments
	Hohes Venn – Eifel Nature Park	1978	720	This natural park is a transboundary park between Belgium and Germany.
	Burdinale-Mehaigne Nature Park	1991	110	
	Two Ourthes Nature Park	2001	760	
	Upper Sure Anlier Forest Nature Park	2001	720	
	Attert Valley Nature Park	1994	70	
	Viroin-Hermeton Nature Park	1998	120	
	Scheldt Plains Nature Park	1996	260	
	Hill Country Nature Park	1997	233	
	Gaume Natural Park	2014	581	
	High Country Nature Park	2002	157	11.5% (1,840 ha) is Natura 2000

== Nature reserves ==
There are many tiny nature reserves, including:

- Zwin 1.58 km^{2} (1.25 km^{2} on Belgian territory)

== Landscape parks ==
There are currently five landscape parks all of whom where founded in 2023.

Photo	Name	Founded in	Area (km^{2})
	Vlaamse Ardennen Landscape Park	2023	
	Zwinstreek Landscape Park	2023	
	Hart van Haspengouw Landscape Park	2023	
	Grenzeloos bocagelandschap Landscape Park	2023	
	Maasvallei Landscape Park	2023	

== See also ==
- List of national parks
