= La Cornette =

- Hamlet in Bouillon
- Location within Belgium Location within Europe
- Coordinates: 49°49′N 5°09.5′E
- Country: Belgium
- Region: Wallonia
- Province: Luxembourg
- Municipality: Bouillon
- Postal code(s): 6834

La Cornette (French pronunciation: [la kɔʁnɛt]) is a hamlet of Wallonia in the municipality of Bouillon, district of Bellevaux, located in the province of Luxembourg, Belgium. It is located on the heights of the Semois river in the southern Ardennes, 9 kilometres from downtown Bouillon.

== History ==
During the seventeenth century, iron mines were discovered at the Honsaure mountain, south of the La Cornette watermill. However, the quality of the ore was very poor, producing only sharp and brittle iron due to the presence of limestone or Minette in the area. According to popular opinion, these mines were closed around the year 1725.

== Points of Interest ==
The aforementioned watermill is a former seventeenth century bakehouse situated on the edge of the Pont le Prêtre stream; it is now a holiday cottage.

The Saut des sorcières hill is 350 metres tall and offers a view of the surrounding area due to its location on one of the many meanders of the Semois.

The Croix des aviateurs is a monument that was erected just north of the hamlet in memory of six pilots from the United Kingdom's Royal Air Force whose aircraft crashed in La Cornette on July 14, 1943.
