= Bohan, Belgium =

Coordinates: 49.86412°N 4.8853°E

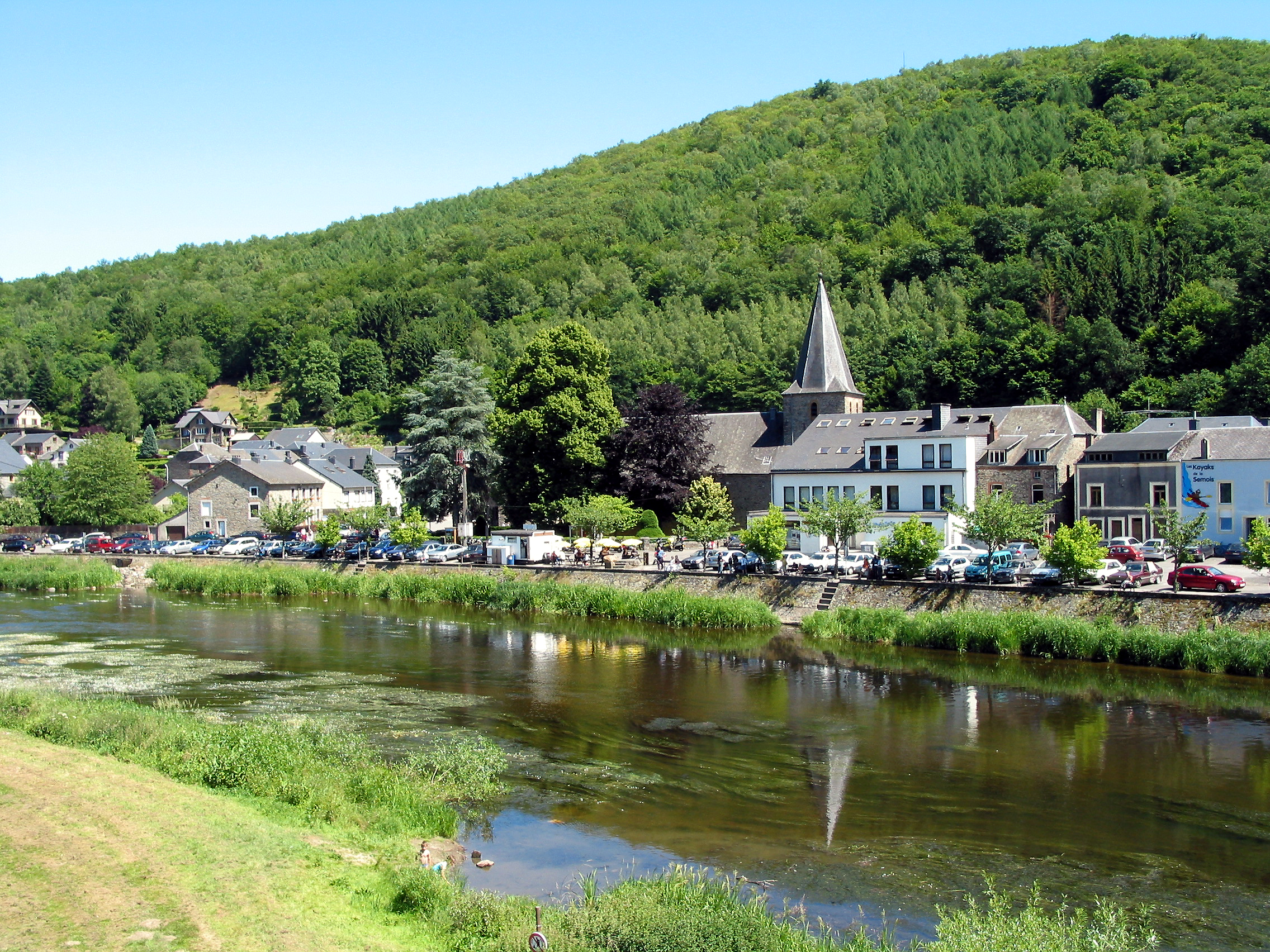
The village of Bohan from across the Semois river

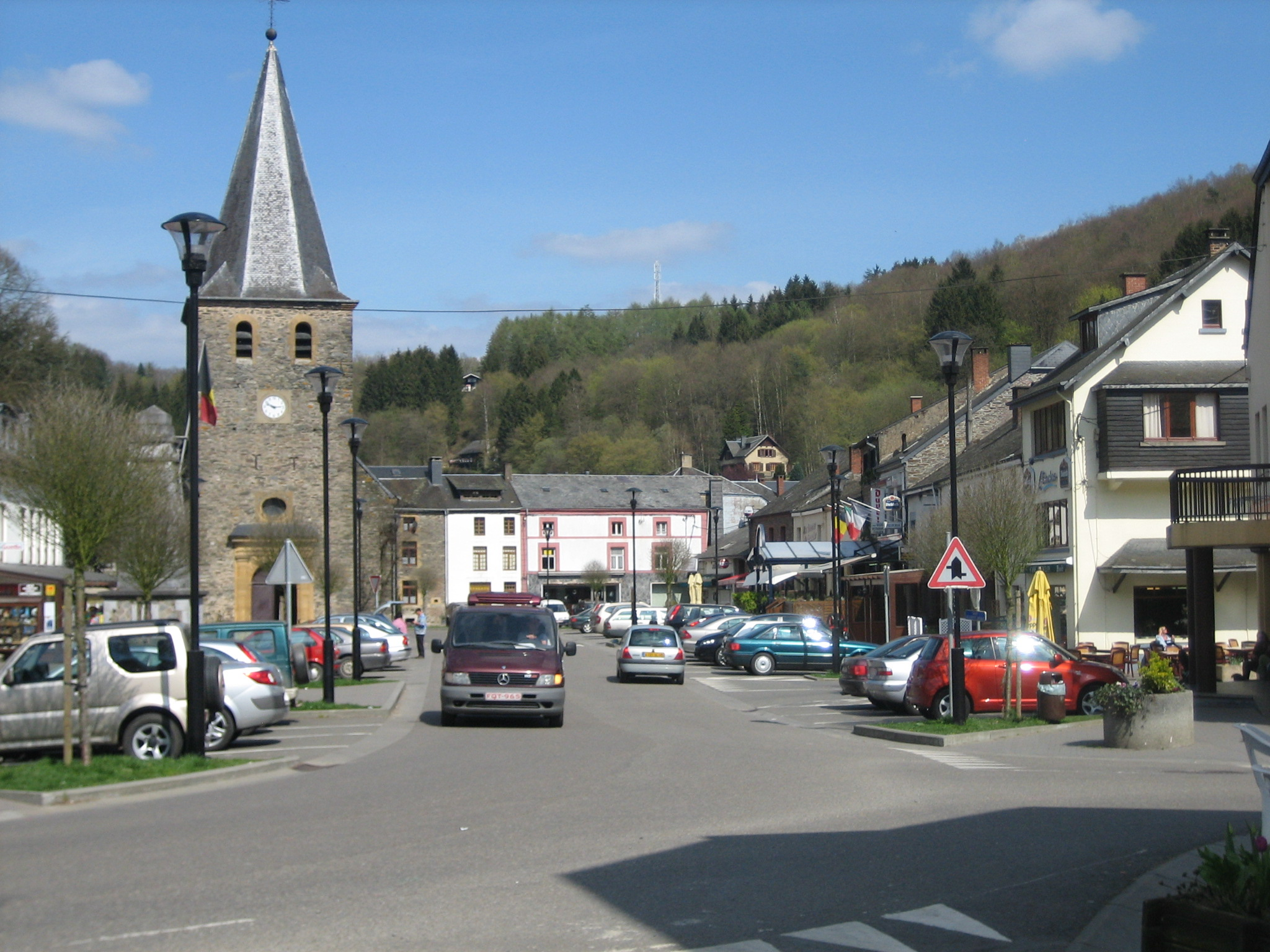
The main village square of Bohan

Bohan (French pronunciation: [bɔɑ̃]; Walloon: Bôhan) is a village of Wallonia and a district of Vresse-sur-Semois, located in the province of Namur, Belgium.

Most of the buildings in the village date from the 18th & 19th centuries. Bohan is located in the Belgian Ardennes mountains on the banks of the Semois river. Bohan is only 2 km from the French border (just across from the town of Charleville) and is surrounded by splendid walks and nature, as well as being close to important second world war sites in the Ardennes.

The micro-climatic conditions in Bohan are very mild. Bohan is the former centre of the forgotten tobacco agriculture in Belgium, evidence of which can still be seen in the village today. Today Bohan is famous for its specialties like tobacco, trout fishing and tourism. The population of Bohan during the year is very small (in the village itself this is around 100) and mainly agricultural; however during the summer the population of the area swells to be several thousand due to this being one of the centres of holidays in Belgium.

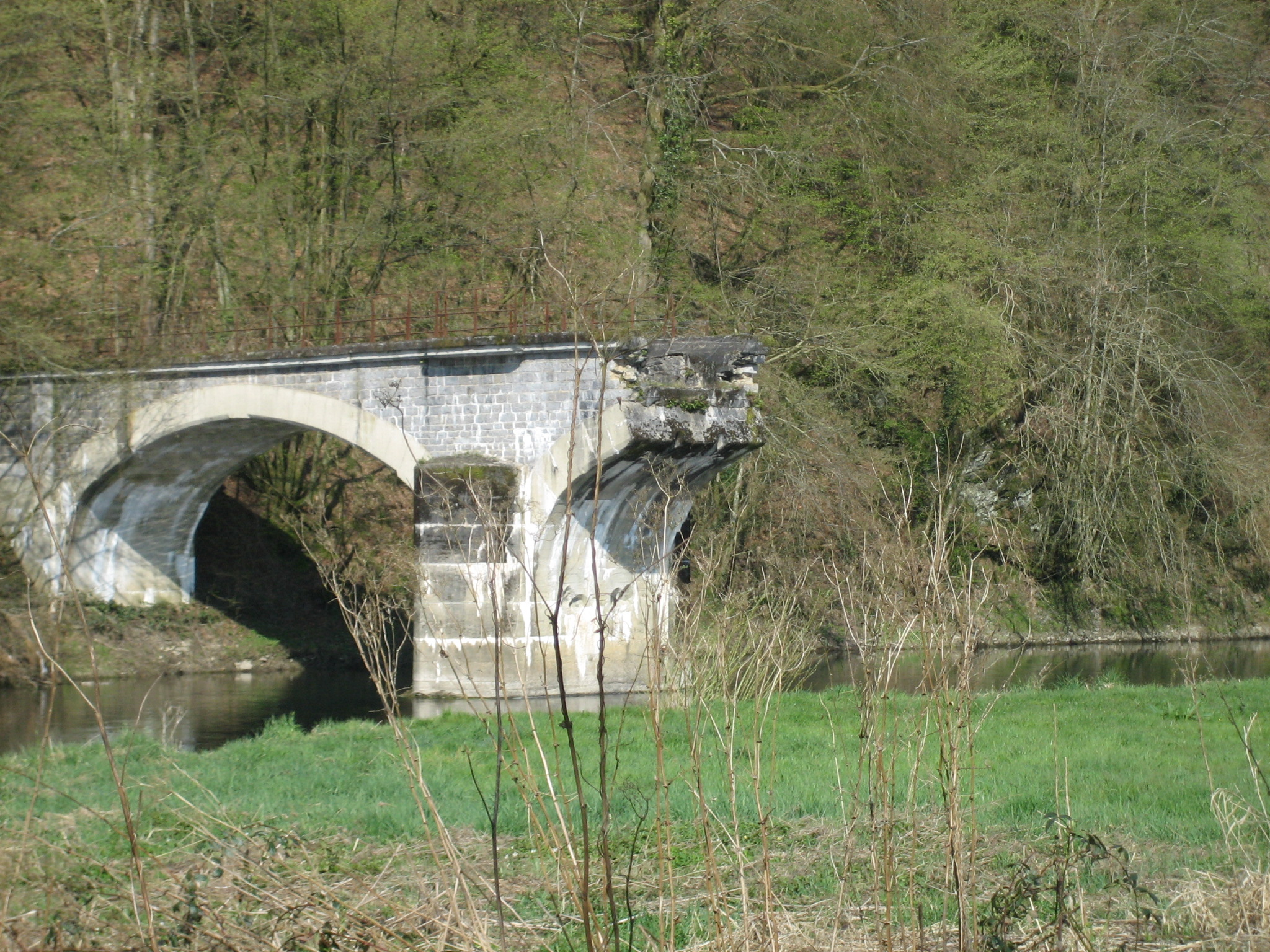
Original tram bridge from 1930 destroyed in second world war

The village is made up of a main square (on which there is a church from the 17th century, plus a number of different bars and restaurants, as well as two butchers and a patisserie) and then a couple of side roads. Due to the Semois river on one side and the hills all around, there is not much room for the village to grow any further. In the area are a large number of camping and holiday parks, thanks to the walking, cycling, horse-riding and kayaking opportunities on offer in the area. The whole surrounding area is a nature lovers paradise. The village also has an important Delhaize grocery and general store, as well as a post office, so is very well catered for given its small size.

Bohan has two bridges across the Semois river. The first is built in stone and is missing two arches. This bridge was originally started in 1930 and was opened in 1935, formed to carry the tram that went through the village to Membre (another village 3 km up the road). On May 11, 1940 two arches were blown up by the French army, to stop the German advance through the Ardennes. The bridge was repaired in 1941, only to be destroyed again in 1944 by the German army as it retreated from Belgium. The bridge remains today with its missing arches, although the tram tracks themselves have long disappeared. The second bridge was built in the 1950s and today is festooned with European and USA flags to show peace and harmony between the various countries.

Bohan is part of the Commune of Vresse-sur-Semois.
