= List of protected heritage sites in Bouillon =

This table shows an overview of the protected heritage sites in the Walloon town Bouillon. This list is part of Belgium's national heritage.

Object	Year/architect	Town/section	Address	Coordinates	Number^{?}	Image
Old castle-fortress of Bouillon, the walls, a fire escape, the bastion of Burgundy and the building and keep for the ensemble of these buildings and surrounding areas ^{(nl)} ^{(fr)}		Bouillon Bouillon		49.792756°N 5.065301°E	84010-CLT-0001-01 Info	Oude kasteel-fort van Bouillon, de wallen, een brandtrap, het bastion van Bourgogne en het wachtgebouw en het ensemble van deze gebouwen en omliggende terreinen More images
The bastion of Brittany and the bastion of the Dauphin ^{(nl)} ^{(fr)}		Bouillon Bouillon		49.797538°N 5.067021°E	84010-CLT-0003-01 Info	Het bastion van Bretagne en het bastion van de Dauphin More images
Ensemble of two mansions in the vicinity of the former castle of Bouillon and the surrounding areas ^{(nl)} ^{(fr)}		Bouillon Bouillon		49.794632°N 5.065376°E	84010-CLT-0005-01 Info	
Mansion near the castle of Bouillon ^{(nl)} ^{(fr)}		Bouillon Bouillon	Rue de Brutz 39	49.795382°N 5.066505°E	84010-CLT-0006-01 Info	Patriciërshuis in de buurt van het kasteel van Bouillon More images
Mansion near the castle of Bouillon ^{(nl)} ^{(fr)}		Bouillon Bouillon	place des Champs-Prévôt n°10	49.796951°N 5.066376°E	84010-CLT-0007-01 Info	Patriciërshuis in de buurt van het kasteel van Bouillon More images
Ducal Museum: the two buildings with collections ^{(nl)} ^{(fr)}		Bouillon Bouillon	Place Ducale	49.794383°N 5.068077°E	84010-CLT-0008-01 Info	Museum Ducal: de twee gebouwen met de collecties More images
Town hall ^{(nl)} ^{(fr)}		Bouillon Bouillon	Place Ducale	49.794708°N 5.068038°E	84010-CLT-0010-01 Info	Raadhuis More images
Vauban barracks: facades and roofs ^{(nl)} ^{(fr)}		Bouillon Bouillon	boulevard Heynen n°16	49.797057°N 5.069282°E	84010-CLT-0011-01 Info	Kazernes Vauban: gevels en daken
Extending the classification of barracks of Vauban ^{(nl)} ^{(fr)}		Bouillon Bouillon		49.796476°N 5.069434°E	84010-CLT-0012-01 Info	
Watering hole ^{(nl)} ^{(fr)}		Noirefontaine Bouillon	Rue de la Sentinelle	49.816570°N 5.090196°E	84010-CLT-0014-01 Info	Drinkplaats
Farm in Frahan ^{(nl)} ^{(fr)}		Rochehaut Bouillon	n°22, Frahan	49.834171°N 5.000886°E	84010-CLT-0016-01 Info	
Bend of the Semois river in Frahan and setting of conservation ^{(nl)} ^{(fr)}		Rochehaut Bouillon		49.839971°N 4.999841°E	84010-CLT-0017-01 Info	Bocht van de Semois te Frahan en instelling beschermingszone More images
Set of St. Firminuskerk, surrounding wall of the churchyard and ensemble of the church, the graveyard and surrounding wall ^{(nl)} ^{(fr)}		Rochehaut Bouillon		49.840253°N 5.006028°E	84010-CLT-0021-01 Info	Geheel van Sint-Firminuskerk, omringende muur rond kerkhof en ensemble van de kerk, het kerkhof en de muur er rond heen More images
Part of the ensemble of the Tombeau du Géant, on the territory of the municipalities Rochehaut and Ucimont, and the places called "Les Grandes Falloiges, les Petites Falloiges, Ravers, Queue de Terme, Fond d'Ucimont, Pres de la Semois, Pré de la Bouche à l'eau, the Assences Pigerue, Pre Saint-Firmin, Pigerue la, le Fretis, Goutai the Wires, Gouttel la, la Rigonel, Scoticainay, la Wire des Quoees, the Couplemou, la Virée du Ru, le Ru " ^{(nl)} ^{(fr)}		Rochehaut en Ucimont Bouillon		49.833889°N 5.013720°E	84010-CLT-0025-01 Info	Deel van het ensemble van de Tombeau du Géant, op het grondgebied van de sections Rochehaut en Ucimont, en de plaatsen "Les Grandes Falloiges, les Petites Falloiges, Ravers, Queue de Terme, Fond d'Ucimont, Prés de la Semois, Pré de la Bouche à l'eau, Assences de Pigerue, Pré Saint-Firmin, la Pigerue, le Frétis, Goutai de Wires, la Gouttel, la Rigonel, Scoticainay, la Wiré des Quoées, de Couplemou, la Virée du Ru, le Ru"
Part of the site of Tombeau du Géant, on the territory of the municipalities Ucimont, Botassart and Corbion and places Merleux Han, le cul de Merleux Han Noires Eaux, Tibetrix, the Pres Germovez, Germovez, Lovete, Loquet, Devant le Mont, Sarsucot ^{(nl)} ^{(fr)}		Corbion en Ucimont Bouillon		49.808248°N 5.008191°E	84010-CLT-0026-01 Info	Deel van de site van Tombeau du Géant, op het grondgebied van de sections Ucimont, Botassart en Corbion en de plaatsen Merleux Han, le Cul de Merleux Han, Noires Eaux, Tibetrix, Prés de Germovez, Germovez, Loveté, Loquet, Devant le Mont, Sarsucot
Part of the site of Tomeau du Geant in Sensenruth, Ucimont and Corbion ^{(nl)} ^{(fr)}		Corbion, Sensenruth en Ucimont Bouillon		49.822979°N 5.030689°E	84010-CLT-0027-01 Info	Deel van de site van Tomeau du Géant te Sensenruth, Ucimont et Corbion
Part of the ensemble of the Tombeau du Géant and includes the places, "L'Orient-Traicot, Tailles des Augustins, l'Epinne, Clernot, Au-dessus the Clernot, l'Ecaillire, du Pré Plane" ^{(nl)} ^{(fr)}		Corbion Bouillon		49.804026°N 5.024737°E	84010-CLT-0028-01 Info	Deel van het ensemble van de Tombeau du Géant en omvat de plaatsen "L'Orient-Traicot, Tailles des Augustins, l'Epinne, Clernot, Au-dessus de Clernot, l'Ecaillire, Pré du Plane" More images
Moulin de Rivage at the Tombeau du Géant, facades and roofs, machine room, channel water to the old mill wheel ^{(nl)} ^{(fr)}		Bouillon		49.817697°N 5.042981°E	84010-CLT-0029-01 Info	Moulin de Rivage bij de Tombeau du Géant, gevels en daken, machineruimte, kanaal voor watertoevoer naar het oude rad More images
Roche aux Fees and the adjacent area of the Semois called Vanne des Bains ^{(nl)} ^{(fr)}		Bouillon		49.790124°N 5.064723°E	84010-CLT-0031-01 Info	"Roche aux Fées" en het aangrenzende gebied van de Semois genaamd Vanne des Bains
Chapel of the Immaculate Conception and the wall around the cemetery ^{(nl)} ^{(fr)}		Bouillon		49.821706°N 5.048344°E	84010-CLT-0033-01 Info	Kapel van Immaculée Conception en de muur rond de begraafplaats More images
Church of Saint-Lambert and the ensemble of the building and its surroundings ^{(nl)} ^{(fr)}		Bouillon		49.825345°N 5.072720°E	84010-CLT-0034-01 Info	Kerk Saint-Lambert en het ensemble van het gebouw en diens omgeving More images
House of the commander, also known as the home of the Provost, located between Boulevard Heynen and Champ Prévôt: facades and roofs and walls of the walled garden ^{(nl)} ^{(fr)}		Bouillon Bouillon		49.797271°N 5.067400°E	84010-CLT-0035-01 Info	Huis van de commandant, ook wel bekend als huis van de provoost, gelegen tussen Boulevard Heynen en Champ Prévôt: gevels en daken en de muren van de ommuurde tuin More images
Castle farm of Dohan: facades and roofs of buildings from the 18th century, large lounge and staircase, and the ensemble of the building and its surroundings ^{(nl)} ^{(fr)}		Dohan Bouillon	Dohan Haut	49.794962°N 5.141898°E	84010-CLT-0036-01 Info	
House ^{(nl)} ^{(fr)}		Rochehaut Bouillon	Rue de la Cense 19	49.840109°N 5.004168°E	84010-CLT-0037-01 Info	
Priory of the Sepulchrines: facades and roofs ^{(nl)} ^{(fr)}		Bouillon Bouillon	Rue du Collège	49.793623°N 5.069520°E	84010-CLT-0038-01 Info	Priorij van de Sépulchrines: gevels en daken
House called "la Poulie" (old gatekeepers house), excluding contemporary extensions ^{(nl)} ^{(fr)}		Bouillon Bouillon	Rue de la Poulie 6, Bouillon	49.79433°N 5.0655°E	84010-CLT-0039-01 Info	Huis genaamd "la Poulie" (oude portierswoning van Polie), uitgezonderd hedendaagse aanbouwen
Farm in Frahan ^{(nl)} ^{(fr)}		Rochehaut Bouillon	n°23, gehucht Frahan	49.834243°N 5.000781°E	84010-CLT-0040-01 Info	
Extension of the listed status of the Vauban ramparts of Bouillon Castle, which were listed by Royal Decree of 26 May 1975, to include two sections not yet listed, situated in the extension of the Bourgogne bastion and the Poulie building (Monument), and the establishment of a protection zone encompassing the Cordemois Bridge, located on Boulevard Heynen, and its surroundings (Protection Zone).		Bouillon Bouillon		49.794028°N 5.065306°E	84010-CLT-0053-01 Info	
Old castle-fortress of Bouillon, the walls, the fire escape, and the main bastion of Burgundy, and the ensemble of buildings and surrounding areas ^{(nl)} ^{(fr)}		Bouillon Bouillon		49.792756°N 5.065301°E	84010-PEX-0001-01 Info	Oud kasteel-fort van Bouillon, de wallen, de brandtrap, bastion Bourgogne en het hoofdgebouw, en het ensemble van de gebouwen en de omliggende terreinen
Bend of the Semois in Frahan ^{(nl)} ^{(fr)}		Rochehaut Bouillon		49.839971°N 4.999841°E	84010-PEX-0002-01 Info	Bocht in de Semois te Frahan

== See also ==
- List of protected heritage sites in Luxembourg (Belgium)
- Bouillon
