= Saint-Médard, Herbeumont =

Saint-Médard Sint-Medåd (Walloon)
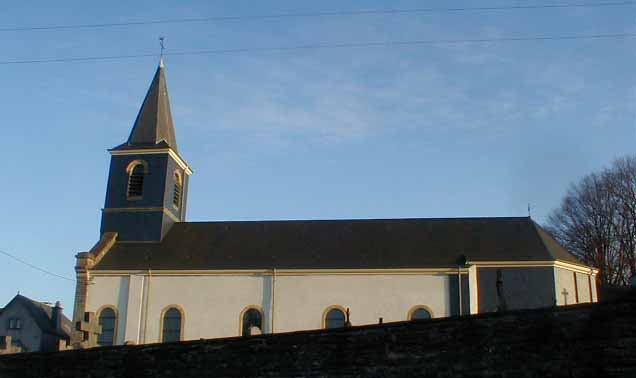
- Saint-Médard village church

- Location within Belgium Location within Europe
- Coordinates: 49°48′50″N 05°19′40″E
- Country: Belgium
- Region: Wallonia
- Province: Luxembourg
- Municipality: Herbeumont

Saint-Médard (French pronunciation: [sɛ̃ medaʁ]; Walloon: Sint-Medåd) is a village of Wallonia and a district of the municipality of Herbeumont, located in the province of Luxembourg, Belgium.

Saint-Médard has a history that goes back to 941. During the Middle Ages, it was subjected to the Counts of Chiny. The village church was built in 1857 and renovated in 1985.
