= Herbeumont Castle =

Coordinates: 49°46′36″N 05°13′58″E

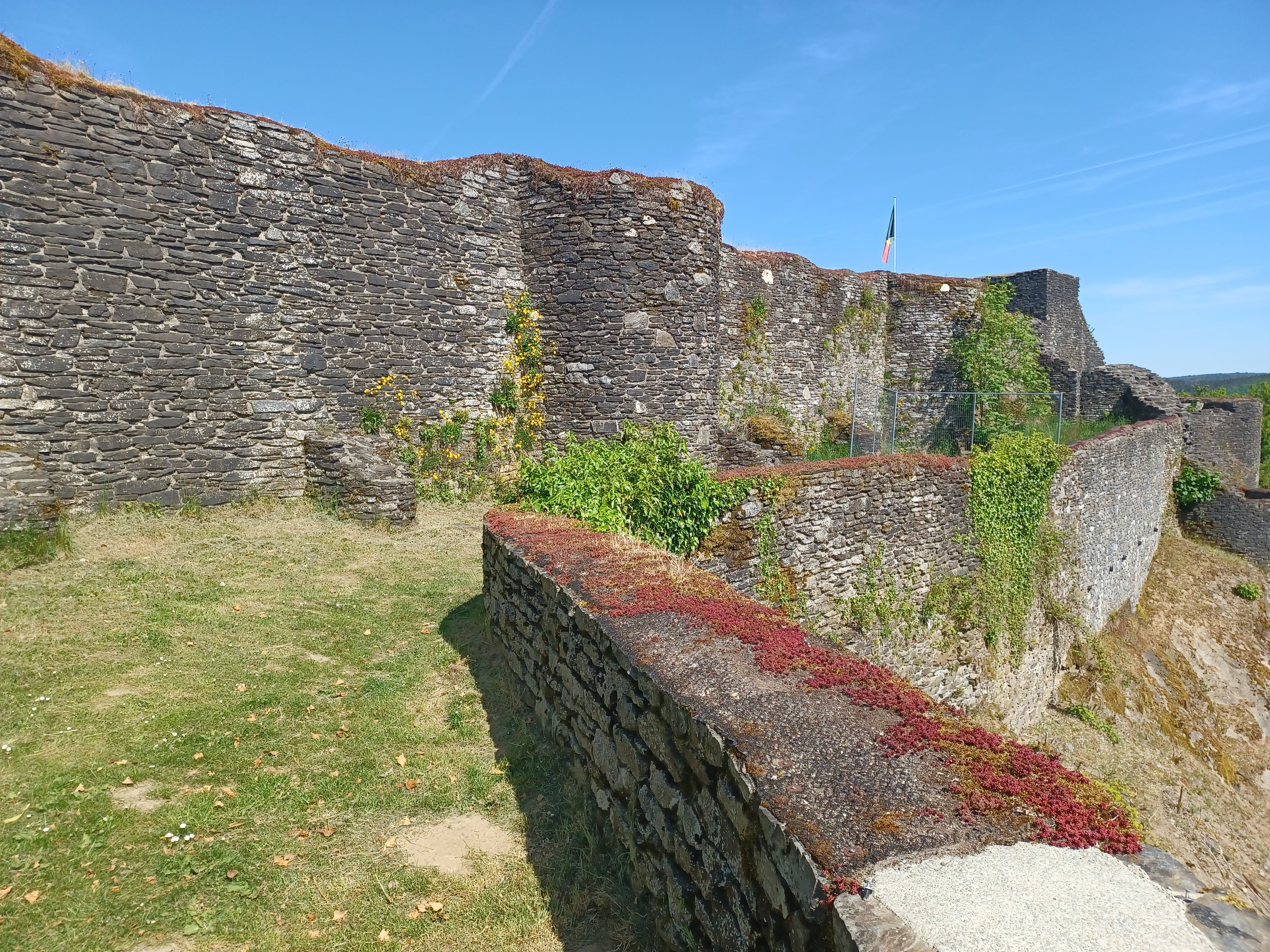
Ramparts of Herbeumont Castle

Herbeumont Castle (French: Château d'Herbeumont) is a ruined medieval castle in Herbeumont, Belgium. It was built in 1268 and belonged to several important noble families before being dismantled by orders of the French king Louis XIV in 1657. It is a listed heritage site since 1938.

== History ==
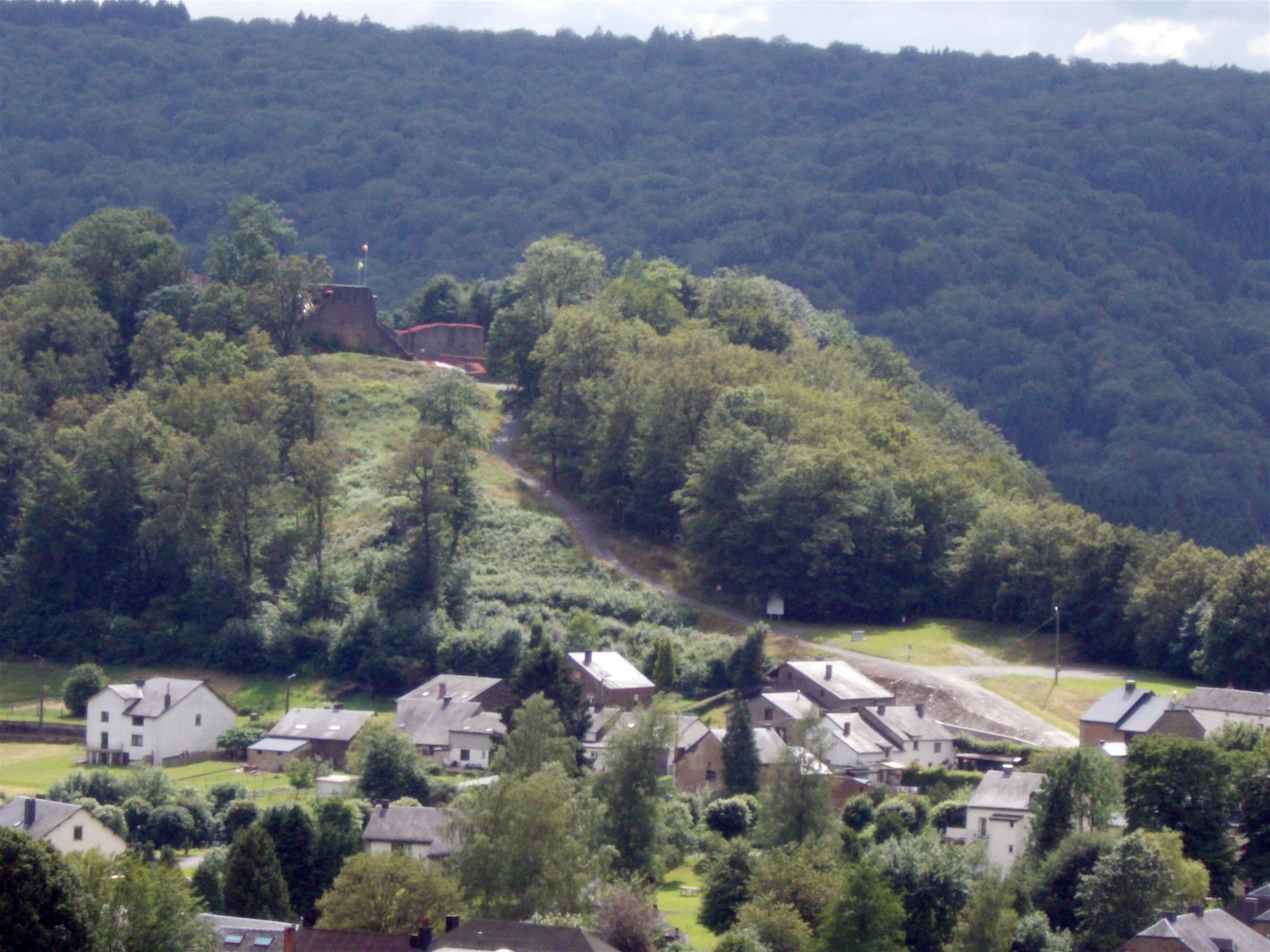
View of the castle ruins (upper left) and their location in Herbeumont

The castle was constructed in 1268, commissioned by Jehan de Rochefort. The original plan included six towers and a keep, and walls surrounding a large central courtyard where a residential buildings was located. It was protected by steep cliffs on three sides and by a dug dry moat on the fourth side.

The castle was substantially rebuilt during the 14th and early 15th centuries, and again in the 16th century in order to adapt the defences to the introduction of efficient artillery. A second residential building was also constructed during the 16th century. Large modifications were again carried out in the early 17th century.

The ownership of the castle passed from the original family to the family of La Marck in 1420, when it and the surrounding estate (including the village of Herbeumont) was bought by Eberhard II von der Mark. In 1544, the castle passed to the Stolberg family, and relatively soon thereafter to the Löwenstein family.

The castle was besieged for the first time in 1558, during the Italian War of 1551–1559. During the Thirty Years' War it was frequently attacked, and its fortifications were dismantled in 1657 by orders of the French king, Louis XIV. The castle was left in ruins until it became a listed heritage site in 1938. Archaeological excavations took place 1973–1976, and the restoration works were carried out in 1992, 2007 and 2009.

== Description ==
The castle lies on a 111 metres (364 ft) tall cliff overlooking the Semois river. It forms an irregular rectangle measuring about 60 metres (200 ft) by 40 metres (130 ft).
