= Vresse-sur-Semois =

- Municipality
- Interactive map of Vresse-sur-Semois
- Coordinates: 49°52′21″N 4°55′54″E
- Country: Belgium
- Community: French Community
- Region: Wallonia
- Province: Namur
- Arrondissement: Dinant

Area
  - Total: 101.53 km^{2} (39.20 sq mi)

Population (2024)
  - Total: 2,459
  - Density: 24/km^{2} (62/sq mi)
- Time zone: UTC+1 (CET)
  - Summer (DST): UTC+2 (CEST)
- Postal code: 5550
- Website: www.vresse-sur-semois.be

Vresse-sur-Semois is a municipality of Wallonia located in the province of Namur, Belgium, in the Ardennes region on the banks of the Semois River. With a population density of approximately 24 inhabitants per km², it is one of the least densely populated municipalities in Belgium. It lies approximately 10 kilometres north of Sedan in France. The municipality is informally called the petite Suisse namuroise ("Little Switzerland of Namur") for its dramatic forested valley landscape.

== Geography ==
The municipality covers 101.53 km² of heavily forested terrain along the lower Semois valley. The Semois carves deep meanders through the Ardennes, creating steep valley walls and narrow floodplains. The river forms part of the Belgian-French border near Bohan before crossing into France.

Notable natural viewpoints within the municipality include the Naglémont viewpoint at 340 metres elevation and the Jambon viewpoint, which offers a panoramic view over a characteristic Semois meander.

In December 2022 the wider Semois Valley was designated a national park — the Parc National de la Semois — covering 29,000 hectares of forests, meadows and river corridor in the southern Ardennes.

=== Sections ===
Following the 1977 Belgian municipal merger (fusion de communes), Vresse-sur-Semois was formed from twelve formerly independent municipalities. These sections are:

- Alle
- Bagimont
- Bohan
- Chairière
- Laforêt
- Membre
- Mouzaive
- Nafraiture
- Orchimont
- Pussemange
- Sugny
- Vresse (the municipal seat)

== History ==
=== Ancient and medieval periods ===
The region lay along the ancient Roman road connecting Reims to Cologne; archaeological finds including imperial coins and worked flint indicate occupation during the Roman period.

The heights of Orchimont formed the medieval political centre of the lower Semois. By the late 10th century Orchimont was already recorded as the seat of an important lordship, and in the 13th century the County of Orchimont exercised authority over a wide area, with its castle serving as the effective capital of the region. In the early 15th century the fortress acquired the sinister nickname Château des Écorcheurs ("Castle of the Flayers"), a reference to the mercenary bands who occupied it. The castle subsequently suffered numerous sieges and successive destructions; by the 19th century it had almost entirely disappeared, leaving only a turret and sections of wall.

During the medieval and early modern periods the territory was part of the Duchy of Luxembourg. A stone bridge, the Pont Saint-Lambert in Vresse, was constructed in 1774 with three irregular arches; its narrowness restricts passage to pedestrians, cyclists and horse riders, and it remains an emblematic local monument.

=== Tobacco cultivation ===
Tobacco cultivation along the Semois floodplain has been recorded since the 16th century, initially for personal use. In 1847 Joseph Pierret, a schoolteacher from Alle-sur-Semois, introduced Burley tobacco seeds to the valley. Despite scepticism about the suitability of the climate, the plant adapted to the unique local terroir — a narrow mist-laden floodplain with shady riverbanks — and gradually evolved into a genetically distinct variety now known as Tabac de la Semois. By 1895 approximately 85 hectares were under cultivation; by 1910 nine million plants were grown on 400 hectares, and the tobacco was celebrated across Europe.

Cultivation declined sharply after World War II due to the influx of American cigarettes, recurring mildew outbreaks, and rising production taxes. Today small-scale production continues, led by a handful of artisan producers. Historic tobacco-drying structures remain visible in the section of Laforêt, and a dedicated tobacco museum preserves the history of the industry.

=== World War II resistance ===
During the German occupation in World War II, the dense forests around Vresse provided cover for armed resistance. In the Vresse forest near Orchimont, members of the resistance established the Camp des Blaireaux (Badger Camp), one of approximately twenty maquis camps in the wider region. The camp was meticulously concealed: smoke from its fires was invisible from outside, and a telephone line was secretly connected to a sympathetic house in Vresse to receive intelligence about German movements. The barracks included dormitories, a kitchen, a refectory, a cellar, a chapel barrack, and a small esplanade with a flagpole where the Belgian flag was raised daily.

In May 1944 a German armoured division located and destroyed the camp's barracks, but the resistance regrouped. By the summer of 1944, more than 4,000 men of the Secret Army were sheltering in forests from Arlon to the Meuse. Of the twenty maquis camps established at that time, the Blaireaux camp alone survives, having been restored and maintained after the war as a heritage site. Each year on the last Sunday of August a ceremony is held at the Chapel of Flachis in memory of the 20 fighters of the Orchimont Group who died in combat or deportation.

== Arts and culture ==
=== The School of Vresse ===
Vresse became a gathering point for artists in the late 19th century, centred on the valley landscape and rural life along the Semois. The movement crystallised in the early 20th century around the painter Albert Raty (1889–1970), who was born in Bouillon and settled in Vresse, and Marie Howet (1897–1984), the first woman to receive the prestigious Prix de Rome in Belgium, awarded in 1922. The grouping also included Camille Barthélemy and the Symbolist painter Léon Frédéric (1856–1940), who created the Nafraiture Triptych.

Comparable in character to the schools of Barbizon, Pont-Aven, and Latem-Saint-Martin, the School of Vresse was not an academic school with a unified doctrine but rather, as contemporaries described it, "a school of friendship and openness." Raty — deaf-mute from an early age — captured the Ardennes landscape in oil paintings distinguished by their contrasted lighting and powerful treatment of clouds, rivers and trees. Howet worked in an Expressionist mode and exhibited extensively in Brittany, Paris, and the Netherlands.

In 1957 José Chaidron, owner of the La Glycine hotel-restaurant in Vresse, opened an art gallery on the premises. La Glycine became the social hub of the movement, attracting hundreds of artists over the following decades and cementing the village's reputation as an art destination. The tourist office of Vresse-sur-Semois is today housed in the La Glycine building.

The Centre d'Interprétation d'Art de l'École de Vresse in the municipality preserves approximately 200 works from the movement and provides a permanent exhibition on the history of the School of Vresse.

=== Folklore ===
Local oral tradition features the Nutons, mischievous dwarf-like creatures said to inhabit the forests and caves around Vresse. The annual Fête des Nutons is held in September. A separate legend of the Dame Blanche (White Lady) is associated with the ruins of Orchimont Castle.

== Tourism and recreation ==
Vresse-sur-Semois is a significant tourist destination within the Belgian Ardennes. Activities centre on the Semois River and the surrounding forests.

=== Kayaking and canoeing ===
Kayaking and canoeing on the Semois is the primary summer activity. The river is generally calm, with occasional easy rapids suitable for families. Popular routes connect the villages of Poupehan, Alle, Vresse, Membre, and Bohan; several kayak rental companies operate in the area.

=== Hiking ===
The municipality is served by 49 marked hiking circuits and forms part of the GR 16 long-distance trail, the "route of the Semois," which follows the river's meanders for hundreds of kilometres. Notable trails include the Sentier des Nutons and the Legends Walk near Laforêt.

=== Notable sites ===
- Pont Saint-Lambert: The 1774 stone bridge in Vresse village, passable only by foot, bicycle, or horse.
- Château d'Orchimont: Ruins of the medieval fortress on the heights of Orchimont, with a surviving turret and wall sections.
- Camp des Blaireaux: Restored World War II resistance camp in the Vresse forest with reconstructed barracks, chapel, and memorial.
- Musée du Tabac de la Semois: Museum documenting the history of tobacco cultivation in the valley.
- Centre d'Interprétation d'Art de l'École de Vresse: Gallery and interpretation centre for the School of Vresse artistic movement.

== Climate ==
Vresse-sur-Semois has an oceanic climate (Köppen Cfb), with cool summers and mild winters. The Ardennes upland location results in higher precipitation and lower temperatures than the Belgian lowlands. The valley-floor position of the villages creates temperature inversions and characteristic morning mists over the river, features that shaped both the local tobacco variety and the atmospheric qualities depicted by School of Vresse painters.

== Demographics ==
As of January 2024, the population of Vresse-sur-Semois stands at approximately 2,459 inhabitants, with a density of 24 inhabitants per km² — one of the lowest densities of any Belgian municipality. Approximately 9.85% of residents are non-Belgian nationals. The population has followed a gradual long-term decline typical of remote Walloon municipalities.

== See also ==
- Semois
- Belgian Ardennes
- Province of Namur
- Albert Raty
- Marie Howet
