= Straimont =

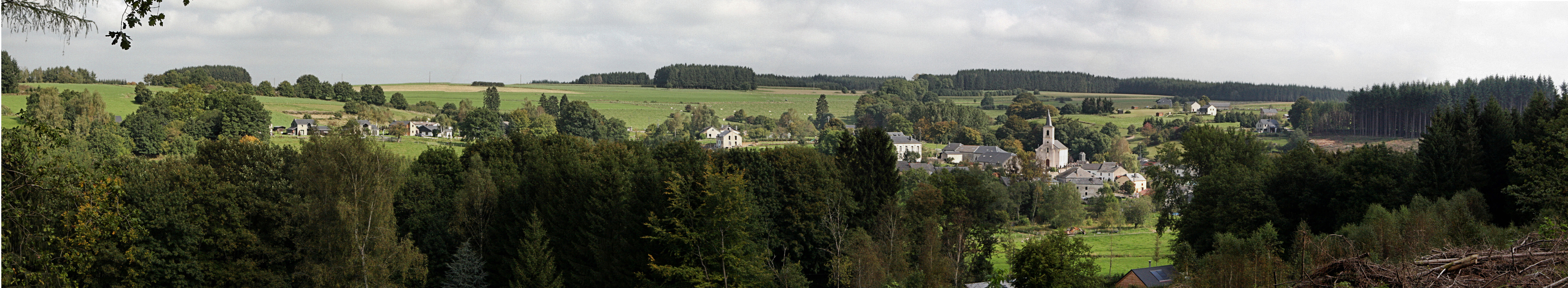
- Straimont

- Location within Belgium Location within Europe
- Coordinates: 49°47′45″N 05°22′48″E
- Country: Belgium
- Region: Wallonia
- Province: Luxembourg
- Municipality: Herbeumont

Straimont (French pronunciation: [stʁɛmɔ̃]) is a village of Wallonia and a district of the municipality of Herbeumont, located in the province of Luxembourg, Belgium.

The village lies close to an old Roman road connecting Reims with Trier. Since 2004, wildlife conservation efforts have been made to maintain the wildlife surrounding the Vierre river around the village.
