= List of protected heritage sites in Herbeumont =

This table shows an overview of the protected heritage sites in the Walloon town Herbeumont. This list is part of Belgium's national heritage.

Object	Year/architect	Town/section	Address	Coordinates	Number^{?}	Image
Site of Herbeumont ruins of the castle and its surroundings: area of special value ^{(nl)} ^{(fr)}		Herbeumont		49.788802°N 5.228266°E	84029-CLT-0001-01 Info	Site van ruïnes van het kasteel Herbeumont en diens omgeving: gebied van bijzondere waarde
Castle Ruins of Herbeumont ^{(nl)} ^{(fr)}		Herbeumont		49.776690°N 5.232830°E	84029-CLT-0002-01 Info	Ruines kasteel Herbeumont
Washing place ^{(nl)} ^{(fr)}		Herbeumont	rue du château	49.774331°N 5.234576°E	84029-CLT-0003-01 Info	Wasplaats
House "Casaquy" ^{(nl)} ^{(fr)}		Herbeumont	rue Paul Mernier, n° 14	49.805513°N 5.358655°E	84029-CLT-0005-01 Info	
Chapel of Saint-Roch ^{(nl)} ^{(fr)}		Herbeumont	rue du château, n° 30	49.776662°N 5.235396°E	84029-CLT-0007-01 Info	
Ruins of castle and surroundings in Herbeumont: area of special value ^{(nl)} ^{(fr)}		Herbeumont		49.788802°N 5.228266°E	84029-PEX-0001-01 Info	Ruïnes en omgeving van kasteel Herbeumont: gebied van bijzondere waarde
Castle Ruins of Herbeumont ^{(nl)} ^{(fr)}		Herbeumont		49.776690°N 5.232830°E	84029-PEX-0002-01 Info	Ruines kasteel Herbeumont

== See also ==
- List of protected heritage sites in Luxembourg (Belgium)
- Herbeumont
