= Marie Howet =

Belgian expressionist painter and illustrator

- Born: 24 March 1897; Libramont-Chevigny, Belgium
- Died: 24 March 1984 (aged 87); Libramont-Chevigny, Belgium
- Known for: Painting
- Movement: Expressionism

Marie Howet (24 March 1897 – 24 March 1984) was a Belgian expressionist painter and illustrator.

Marie Françoise Céline Howet was born in Libramont, daughter of Constant Howet, a doctor, and Pauline Thiry. She received a musical education and learned drawing, attending school in Arlon. Originally she planned to study music but instead chose art and enrolled at the Académie Royale des Beaux-Arts in Brussels. Here she studied under Constant Montald. In her first year she received several prizes, but the outbreak of the First World War led to her family's exile in France. In 1915 she enrolled in the École Nationale Supérieure des Beaux-Arts in Paris.

After the war she returned to Belgium and set up a studio at Rochehaut, near Bouillon, later moving to Saint Gilles. In 1922, aged 25, she won the Belgian Prix de Rome, organised by Belgian arts minister Jules Destrée, for her Devant la maison à Rochehaut.

Her works received critical acclaim and several prizes for her work. She travelled and exhibited frequently abroad, illustrating collections of poetry on Greece, Turkey, Ireland, and Italy.

She died on her 87th birthday at Libramont.
