= National Park Entre-Sambre-et-Meuse =

National park in Belgium

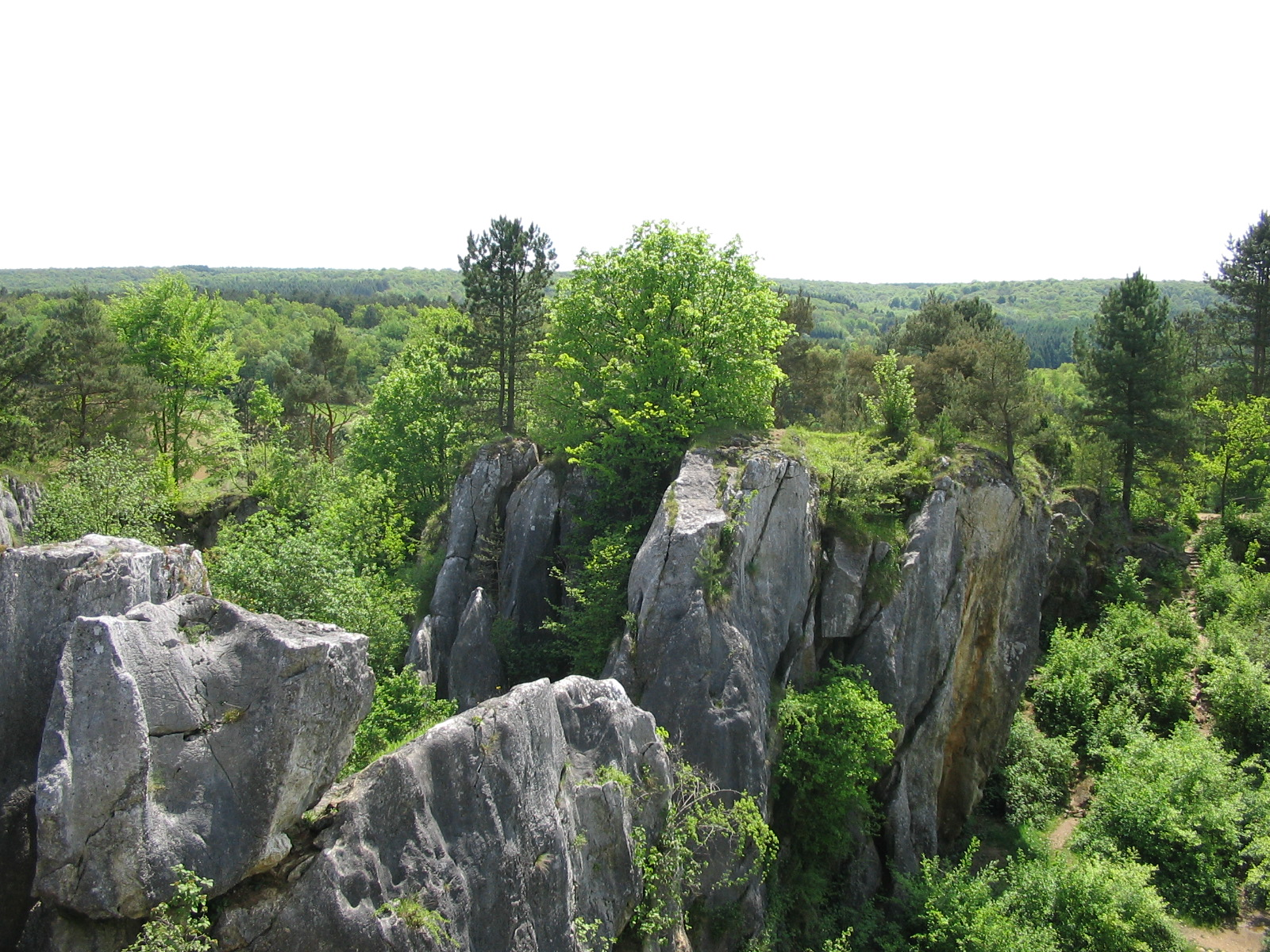
- Fondry des Chiens in the National Park Entre-Sambre-et-Meuse

- Location within Belgium Location within Europe
- Location: Wallonia, Belgium
- Coordinates: 50°4′30″N 4°19′48″E
- Area: 22,500 ha (56,000 acres)
- Established: 2022
- Website: https://www.parc-national-esem.be/en

The National Park Entre-Sambre-et-Meuse (French: Parc national de l'Entre-Sambre-et-Meuse, Dutch: Nationaal Park Entre-Sambre-et-Meuse) is a national park in Wallonia, Belgium. It is one of two national parks in Wallonia. It was established in 2022 and spans an area of 22,500 hectares (225 km^{2}; 56,000 acres). It covers a geologically diverse area which supports a high degree of biodiversity.

== History ==
The national park was established by a decision of the government of Wallonia on 9 December 2022. The Semois Valley National Park was established at the same time; the two were chosen among four possible locations for new national parks. The new parks have been established in compliance of the International Union for Conservation of Nature definition and standards concerning national parks. The establishment of the national park was accompanied by a grant of 14 million euros, partially supplied via the Recovery and Resilience Facility, part of the Next Generation EU, a European Union-wide economic recovery plan following the COVID-19 pandemic. In March 2026, it was reported in local media that the national park was looking for ways to secure future funding.

== Description ==
The national park extends over five municipalities, Chimay, Couvin, Froidchapelle, Momignies and Viroinval, across two provinces: Hainaut and Namur. It spans three distinct geological regions: the Fagne, the Calestienne and the Ardennes. This diverse geology has generated a landscape characterised by great variety and a multitude of different habitat types. The park includes three rivers: Eau Noire, Eau Blanche and Viroin. The area is heavily forested, and together with the adjacent Semois Valley National Park constitutes one of the largest contiguous forested areas of Western Europe. The varied landscape, and traditional methods of utilising the land, have created an area of rich biodiversity. Almost 90 percent of the fauna native to Wallonia can be found within the area of the national park. One of the main purposes of the establishment of the national park is to maintain this high level of biodiversity.

With the establishment of the national park, a large number of actions have been made or planned to sustain biodiversity. For example, areas of woodland have been given protected status and thus spared from logging, free-range sheep herding has been re-introduced, and rewilding efforts have been put in place along some of the waterways. Projects to encourage tourism in the area have also been initiated; in 2026, construction of five observation towers began in the national park.

== See also ==
- List of protected areas of Belgium
