= F. Curtis Dohan =

American physician (1907–1991)

Francis Curtis Dohan (March 24, 1907 – November 9, 1991) was an American research physician and endocrinologist.

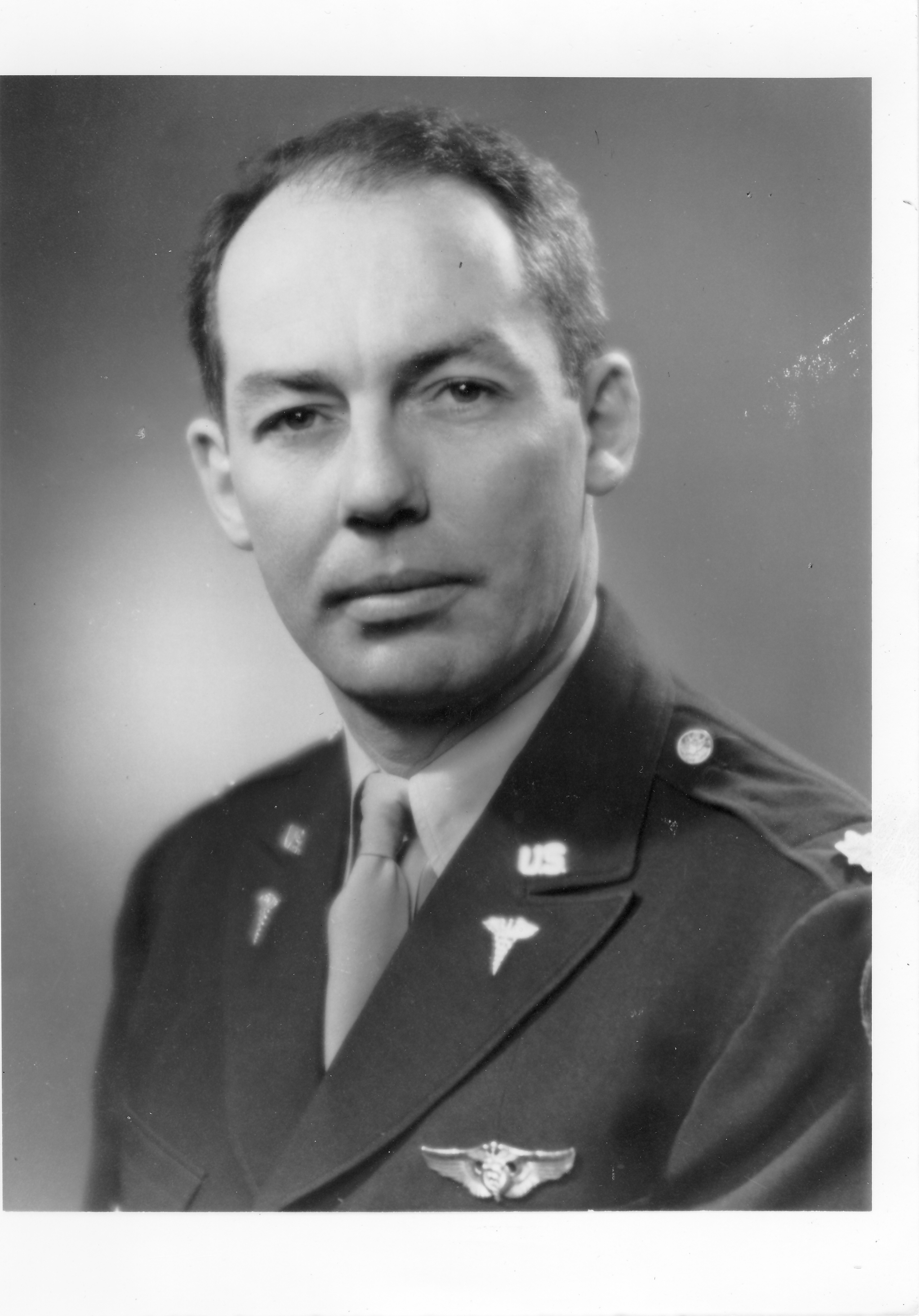
F. Curtis Dohan, M.D. in 1945

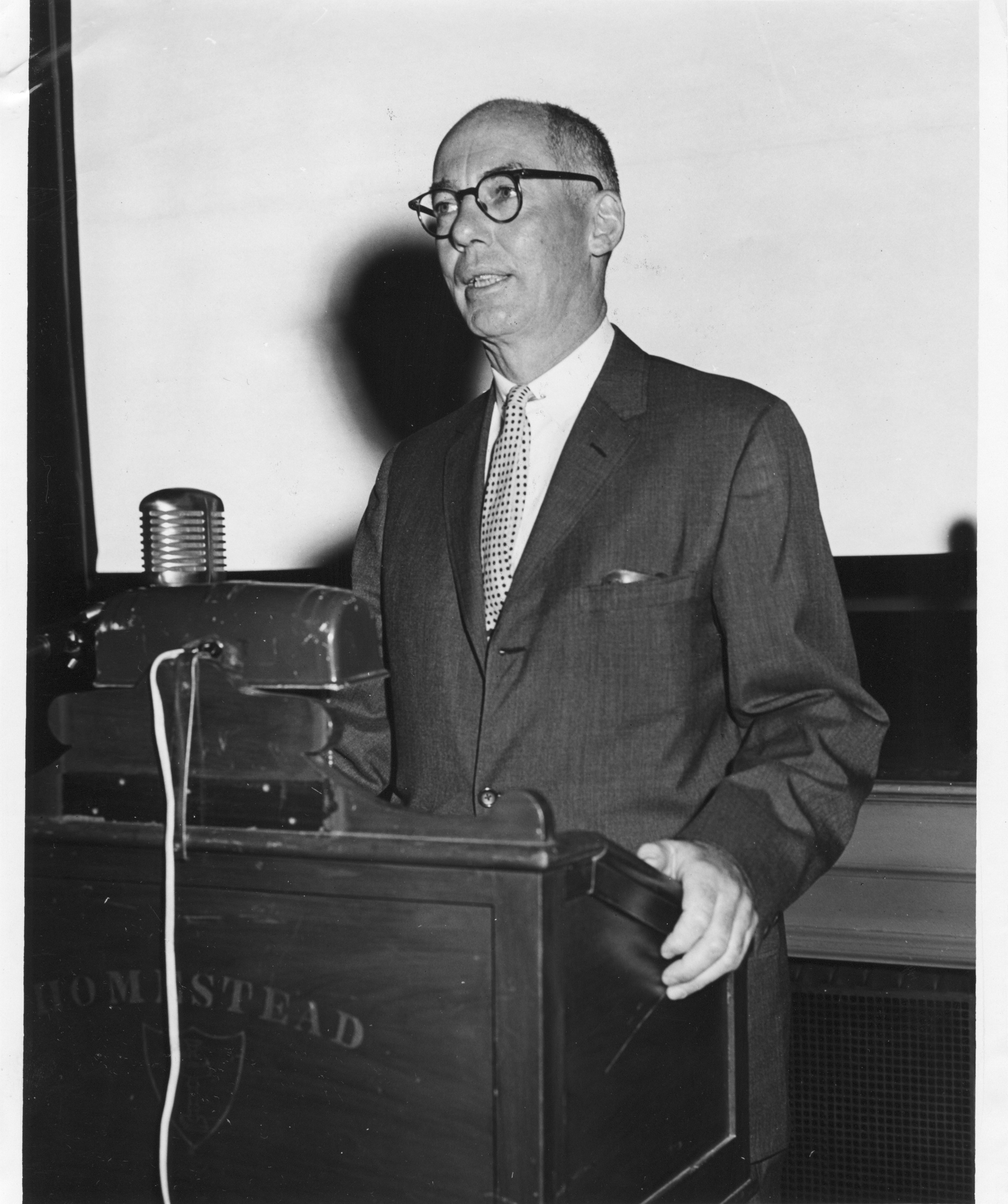
F. Curtis Dohan, M.D. in 1959

== Life and education ==
Dohan was born in Philadelphia, Pennsylvania. His father was William Henry Dohan. His mother was Elizabeth Rees (Repplier) Dohan.

Dohan attended Haverford College before matriculating into the School of Medicine at the University of Pennsylvania (Penn) in Philadelphia. Upon graduation in 1932 he began a rotating internship at the Hospital of the University of Pennsylvania, after which he completed fellowship training in endocrinology with Fuller Albright at the Massachusetts General Hospital.

== Medical career ==
In 1935 Dohan returned to Penn to work at the Cox Medical Research Institute (Cox), where he collaborated with Francis D.W. Lukens, MD.

During World War II Dohan joined the US Army Air Corps and served as a flight surgeon in Africa.

In 1946 he returned to Cox, and he served on the faculty at Penn for many years. Concurrently he held the position of Medical Director at Radio Corporation of America (RCA), through which he supervised the medical care of employees at RCA plants all over the United States. This position allowed him to collect medical data over decades and analyze it epidemiologically.

== Medical research ==
As a medical researcher Dohan published many scientific articles, and he made significant contributions in the areas of whiplash injuries following car crashes, respiratory illness following exposure to air pollutants, and the appropriate duration of in-hospital convalescence following surgery.

Some of his most interesting and challenging research involved the occasional association of schizophrenia with celiac disease. His work enticed many of his contemporaries to follow the genetic and metabolic nuances of this association in hope that a better understanding might lead to the prevention of many cases of schizophrenia. Definitive answers remained elusive, yet in the 21st century this association has continued to fascinate and motivate medical researchers.
