= Herbeumont =

Municipality in Wallonia, Belgium

Herbeumont Arbûmont (Walloon)
- Municipality
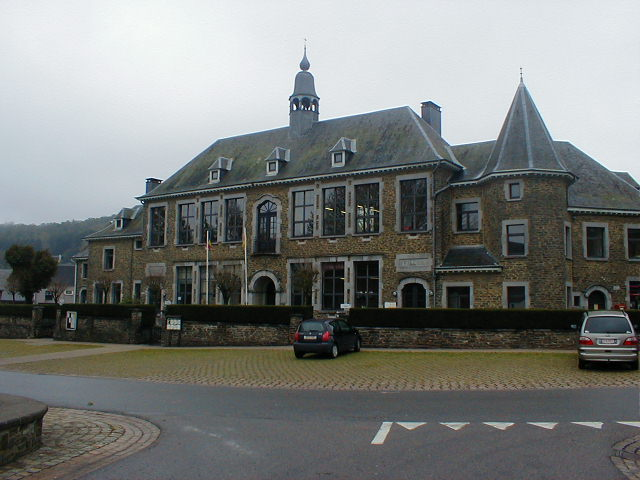
- The town hall

- Flag Coat of arms

- Location of Herbeumont in Luxembourg province
- Interactive map of Herbeumont
- Location in Belgium
- Coordinates: 49°46.85′N 05°14.25′E
- Country: Belgium
- Community: French Community
- Region: Wallonia
- Province: Luxembourg
- Arrondissement: Neufchâteau

Government
  - Mayor: Catherine Mathelin
  - Governing party: Action

Area
  - Total: 58.42 km^{2} (22.56 sq mi)

Population (2018-01-01)
  - Total: 1,627
  - Density: 27.85/km^{2} (72.13/sq mi)
- Postal codes: 6887
- NIS code: 84029
- Area codes: 061
- Website: (in French) herbeumont.be

Herbeumont (French pronunciation: [ɛʁbømɔ̃]; Walloon: Arbûmont) is a municipality of Wallonia located in the province of Luxembourg, Belgium.

On 1 January 2007, the municipality, which covers 58.81 km^{2}, had 1,536 inhabitants, giving a population density of 26.1 inhabitants per km^{2}.

The municipality consists of the following districts: Herbeumont, Saint-Médard, and Straimont. Other population centers include: Gribomont, Martilly, and Menugoutte. Herbeumont Castle, a ruined medieval castle, is located in Herbeumont.

== Dutroux escape ==
In April 1998, Marc Dutroux escaped from his guards while he was being transferred to court without handcuffs by overpowering one of his guards and taking his pistol, but he was captured later in Herbeumont by a ranger in the nearby woods. That resulted in the resignation of Interior Minister Johan Vande Lanotte, Justice Minister Stefaan De Clerck and the former police chief.

== Notable residents ==
- Jean-Nicolas Perlot (1823–1900), adventurer and participant in the California Gold Rush, born in Herbeumont

== See also ==
- List of protected heritage sites in Herbeumont
