= Semois =

River in Belgium and France

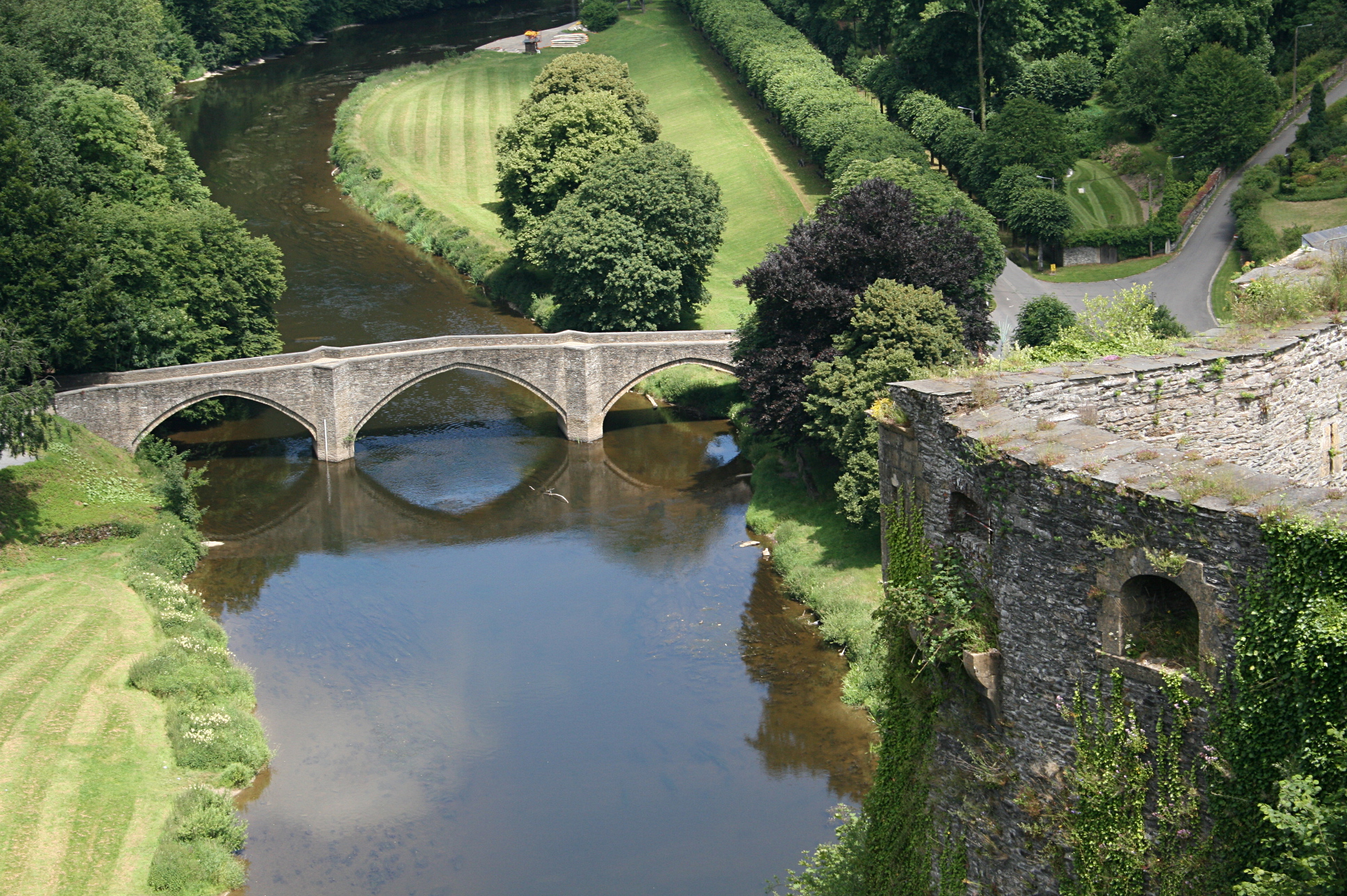
- The Semois in Bouillon

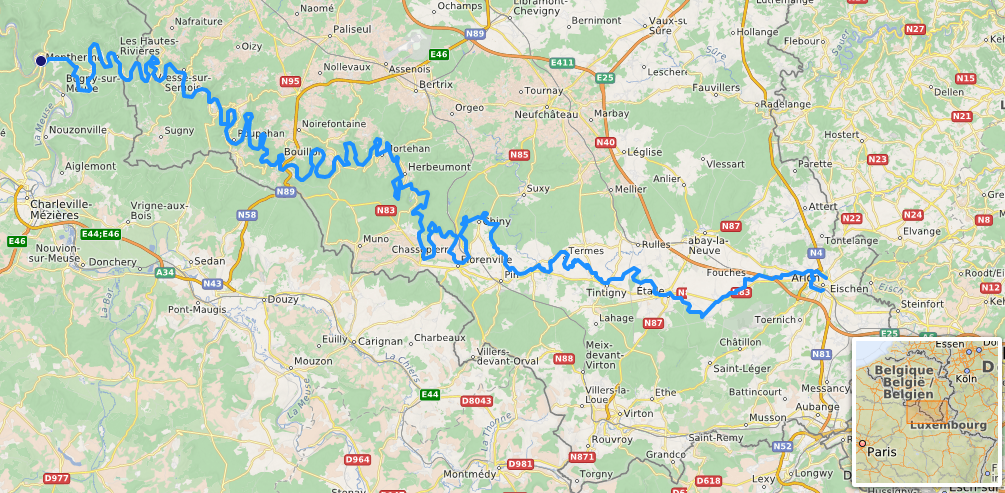
- Course of the Semois

Location
- Countries: Belgium and France

Physical characteristics
- Source
  - location: Arlon
  - coordinates: 49°40′54″N 5°49′13″E
  - elevation: 410 m (1,350 ft)
- Mouth
  - location: Monthermé
  - coordinates: 49°52′50″N 4°44′18″E
- Length: 210 km (130 mi)
- Basin size: 1,329 km^{2} (513 sq mi)
- Discharge
  - average: 35 m^{3}/s (1,200 cu ft/s)

Basin features
- Progression: Meuse→ North Sea

The Semois (French pronunciation: [səmwa]; Simwès in Walloon, often under elided form Smwès; Semoy, Sesbach in German, Setzbaach in Luxembourgish of Arlon; and known as the Semoy in France) is a river flowing from the Ardennes uplands of Belgium and France towards the Meuse, of which it is a right tributary.

The source of the Semois is in Arlon, Wallonia, in the Belgian province of Luxembourg, close to the border with the Grand Duchy of Luxembourg. Flowing in a roughly westerly direction, it enters France after passing through the Belgian village of Bohan-sur-Semois and forms about 2 kilometres (1.2 mi) of the Belgian–French border. It joins the Meuse 24 kilometres (15 mi) further downstream in Monthermé. The total length of the river is 210 kilometres (130 mi). Much of the river course lies within the Semois Valley National Park.

Other places on the banks of the Semois are Chiny, Florenville, Herbeumont, Bouillon (including the localities of Dohan and Poupehan), and Vresse-sur-Semois (all in Belgium).

The earliest documentation of the name, as SESMARA, is dated from the 2nd century AD. That was before that region was influenced by significant Germanic immigration. Medieval forms include Sesomirs (664), Sesmarus (950), Sesmoys (1104), and Semoir (1244).

The river has given its name to a variety of tobacco grown in the area.

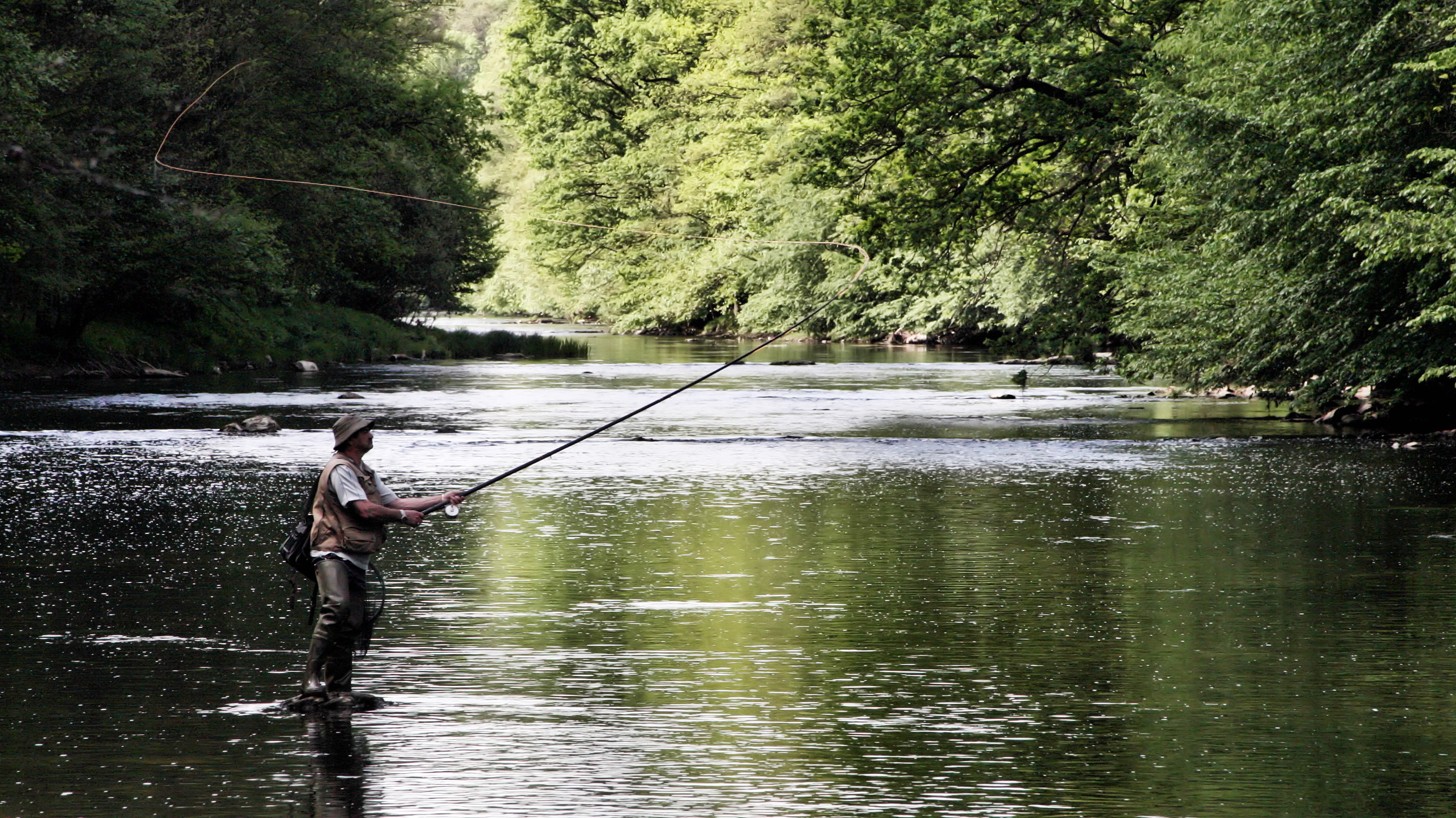
The Semois near Florenville
