= Bouillon, Belgium =

City in Wallonia, Belgium

Bouillon Bouyon (Walloon)
- City and municipality
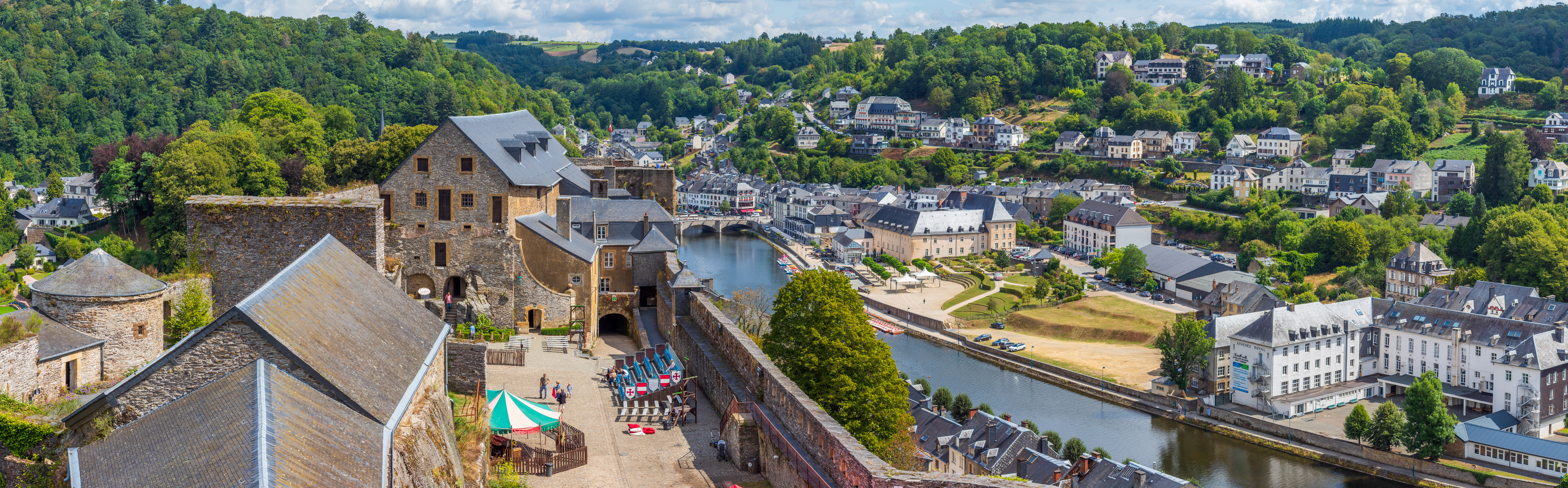
- Bouillon

- Flag Coat of arms

- Location of Bouillon in Luxembourg
- Interactive map of Bouillon
- Location in Belgium
- Coordinates: 49°47.73′N 05°4.08′E
- Country: Belgium
- Community: French Community
- Region: Wallonia
- Province: Luxembourg
- Arrondissement: Neufchâteau

Government
  - Mayor: Patrick Adam (PS, Ensemble)
  - Governing party: Ensemble

Area
  - Total: 148.64 km^{2} (57.39 sq mi)

Population (2018-01-01)
  - Total: 5,353
  - Density: 36.01/km^{2} (93.27/sq mi)
- Postal codes: 6830, 6831, 6832, 6833, 6834, 6836, 6838
- NIS code: 84010
- Area codes: 061
- Website: www.bouillon.be

Bouillon (French pronunciation: [bujɔ̃]; Walloon: Bouyon) is a city and municipality of Wallonia located in the province of Luxembourg in the Ardennes, Belgium.

The municipality, which covers 149.09 km^{2}, had 5,477 inhabitants, giving a population density of 36.7 inhabitants per km^{2}.

The municipality consists of the following districts: Bellevaux, Bouillon, Corbion, Dohan, Les Hayons, Noirefontaine, Poupehan, Rochehaut, Sensenruth, Ucimont, and Vivy.

== History ==
In the Middle Ages Bouillon was a lordship within the Duchy of Lower Lorraine and the principal seat of the Ardennes-Bouillon dynasty in the 10th and 11th century. In the 11th century they dominated the area, and held the ducal title along with many other titles in the region. Bouillon was the location of the ducal mint and the dominant urban concentration in the dukes' possession.

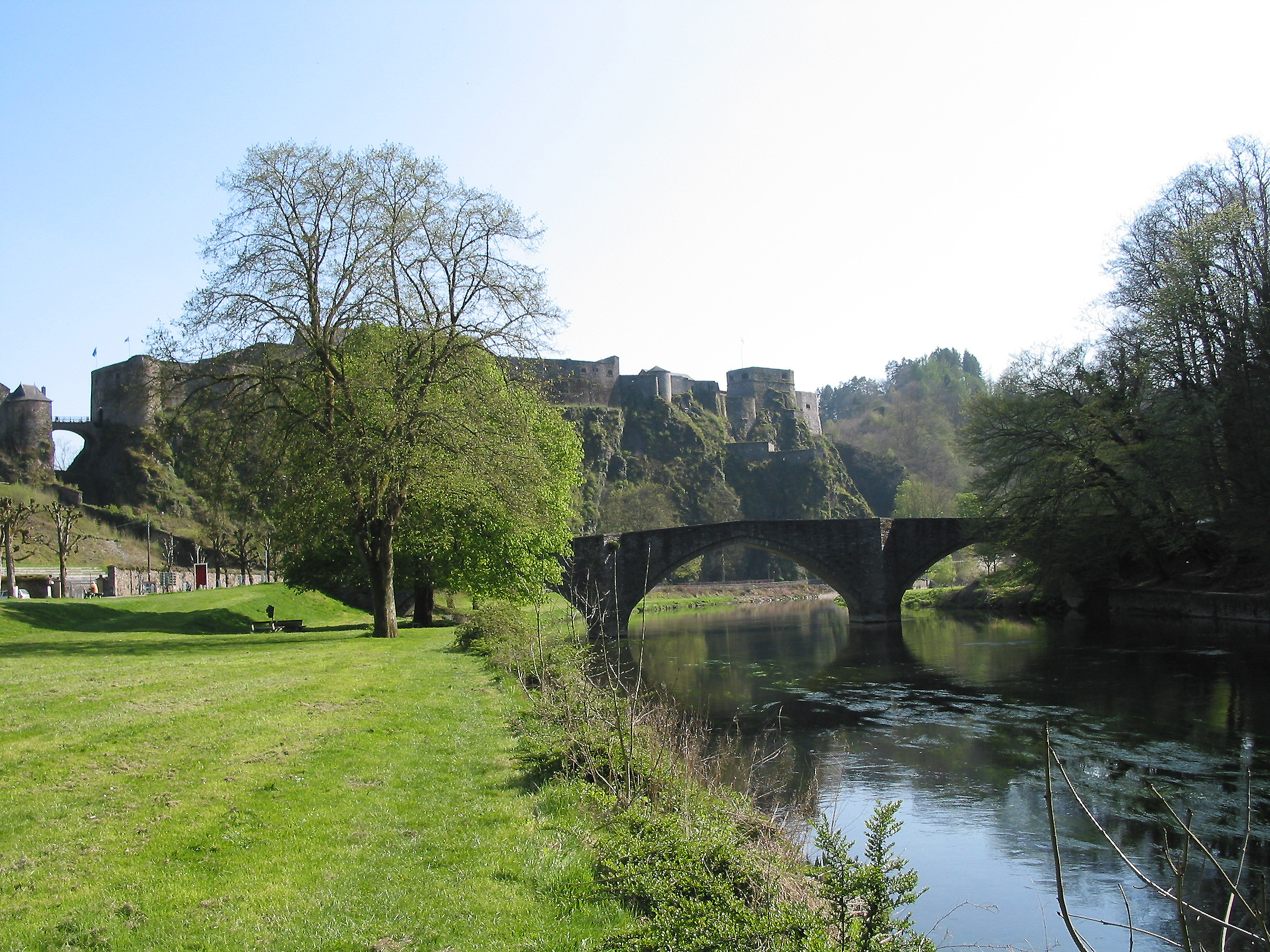
The Semois river and the Bouillon Castle (13th/19th centuries)

There is a common misconception that Bouillon was a county. While the lords of Bouillon often were counts and dukes, Bouillon itself was not a county. The fortification of Bouillon Castle was, along with the County of Verdun, the core of the possessions of the Ardennes-Bouillon dynasty, and their combined territory was a complex mixture of fiefs, allodial land and other hereditary rights throughout the area. An example of the latter is the Advocacy of the monastery of Saint-Hubert en Ardennes, which was granted to Godfrey II by the prince-bishop of Liège.

The most famous of the Lords of Bouillon was Godfrey of Bouillon, a leader of the First Crusade and the first ruler of the Kingdom of Jerusalem. He sold the Bouillon estate to the Prince-Bishopric of Liège. The prince-bishops started to call themselves dukes of Bouillon, and the town emerged as the capital of a sovereign duchy by 1678, when it was captured from the prince-bishopric by the French army and given to the La Tour d'Auvergne family. The duchy was prized for its strategic location as "the key to the Ardennes" (as Vauban called it) and hence to France itself. It remained a quasi-independent protectorate, like Orange and Monaco, until 1795, when the Republican Army annexed it to France.

After the defeat of Napoleon Bonaparte, the city was given to the Netherlands in the 1815 Treaty of Paris. It has been part of Belgium since the Revolution of 1830.

=== Chronology ===
- 988 – First mention of the castle of Bouillon in a letter to Godfrey the Captive from his brother, Archbishop Adalberon of Reims.
- 1045 – Godfrey the Bearded rebels against the emperor, who has the castle destroyed.
- 1065 – Godfrey the Bearded comes to terms with the emperor and rebuilds the castle in Bouillon.
- 1082 – Bouillon Castle is inherited by Godfrey of Bouillon, who sells it to the prince-bishop of Liège for 3 marks of gold and 1300 marks of silver in order to finance his participation in the First Crusade. Pursuant to the treaty, Godfrey and his three successors retain the right to repurchase the castle at the same price but have no money to make good this privilege.
- 1129 – Godfrey's indirect successor, Count Renaud of Bar, captures Bouillon Castle by force.
- 1141 – The prince-bishop of Liège expels Count Renaud from Bouillon.
- 1155 – The Holy Roman Emperor confirms the prince-bishopric's rights to Bouillon.
- 1291 – The prince-bishops of Liège start to style themselves "Dukes of Bouillon", referring to the castle's former position as the seat of the dukes of Lower Lorrain.
- 14th century – Bouillon Castle, as an exclave of the prince-bishopric of Liège, is governed by specially appointed castellans.
- 1415 – The office of castellan becomes a hereditary possession of the van der Marck (de la Marck) family, a cadet branch of the future dukes of Clèves and Jülich.
- 1482 – William de la Marck has Louis de Bourbon, Bishop of Liège assassinated and succeeded by his own son John de la Marck. Another part of the chapter elects John van der Horn as an anti-bishop, thus plunging the prince-bishopric into a civil war.
- 21 May 1484 – Treaty is signed at Tongeren, whereby the La Marck family forfeits its claims to the prince-bishopric and supports Liège's struggle against Emperor Maximilian for the reward of 30,000 livres. Bouillon Castle is mortgaged to William de la Marck until the time of repayment.
- 1492 – The treaty of Donchery reiterates the provisions of the treaty of Tongeren. As no repayment follows, the La Marck family retains Bouillon Castle and assumes the title of the Dukes of Bouillon.
- 1521 – The army of Emperor Charles V takes hold of Bouillon and restitutes it to the prince-bishopric of Liège.
- 1526 – Robert III de la Marck is promoted to Marshal of France and styles himself Duke of Bouillon on this occasion.
- 1529 – The Treaty of Cambrai obligates François I of France not to help Robert III in his struggle to retake Bouillon.
- 1547 – Robert IV de la Marck is made Marshal of France. The letters patent officially style him "Duc de Bouillon".
- 1552 – Henry II of France reconquers Bouillon from the prince-bishops and gives it to Robert IV.
- 1559 – The Treaty of Cateau-Cambrésis restitutes Bouillon to the prince-bishops of Liège, stipulating that the rights to the disputed territory are to be determined by a special arbitration, which never takes place.
- 1598 – The Treaty of Vervins again calls for arbitration of the dispute between the prince-bishopric and the La Marck family.
- 15 October 1591 – Upon extinction of the La Marck family, their heiress Charlotte is married to Henri de La Tour d'Auvergne, Marshal of France.
- 8 May 1594 – Charlotte de la Marck dies without issue, and her claims to Bouillon pass to her husband, Henri de la Tour d'Auvergne.
- 24 October 1594 – Charlotte's cousin, Henri de Bourbon, Duke of Montpensier, gives up his claims to the Bouillon succession in exchange for an annuity.
- 5 August 1601 – An agreement is signed between Henri de La Tour d'Auvergne and Charlotte's paternal uncle, Comte de Maulevrier, whose descendants continue to press their claims to Bouillon for the rest of the 17th century.
- 3 September 1641 – Henri's son, Frédéric Maurice de La Tour d'Auvergne, renounces his claims to the reward of 30,000 livres promised by the prince-bishops of Liege in the Treaty of Tongeren.
- 1651 – Frédéric Maurice de La Tour d'Auvergne exchanges his sovereign princely titles for several ducal and comital titles in the Peerage of France. The agreement obligates France to restitute Bouillon to the La Tour d'Auvergne family on the first opportunity.
- 1658 – Pursuant to the convention of 1641, the prince-bishops of Liège pay 150,000 guelders to Frederic Maurice, but he continues to style himself Duc de Bouillon despite their protests.
- 1676 – The French army takes Bouillon from the prince-bishops and restitutes it to the House of La Tour d'Auvergne, as was promised by the exchange of 1651.
- 1679 – The Treaties of Nijmegen confirm the House of La Tour d'Auvergne in possession of the duchy of Bouillon. Although a French contingent remains stationed in Bouillon, the dukes exercise sovereign rights to coin money, create peers and grant other titles. They also claim Saint-Hubert as one of their "peerages".
- 1757 – Charles Godefroy de La Tour d'Auvergne is welcomed in Bouillon as a sovereign duke, despite formal protests issued by the prince-bishop of Liège.
- 1786 – The 6th Duke of Bouillon, Godefroy de La Tour d'Auvergne, adopts Philippe d'Auvergne, a British captain and his postulated relative.
- 25 June 1791 – The 6th Duke of Bouillon issues a declaration naming Philippe d'Auvergne as successor in Bouillon after the extinction of the La Tour d'Auvergne family.
- 3 December 1792 – The 6th Duke of Bouillon dies and his son, Jacques Léopold de La Tour d'Auvergne, becomes the 7th Duke of Bouillon.
- 1794 – The French Revolutionary Army invade the Duchy of Bouillon and for 18 months it was the independent Republic of Bouillon.
- 25 October 1795 – Annexation of Bouillon by the French Republic.
- 27 December 1796 – French Republic promulgates a law restoring all the estates of Bouillon to the 7th Duke.
- 26 August 1798 – French Republic sequesters all the estates of Bouillon pertaining to the 1651 exchange.
- 8 March 1800 – The sequester is repealed and the estates are restored to the 7th Duke of Bouillon.
- 7 February 1802 – Death of the 7th Duke and the extinction of the La Tour d'Auvergne family.
- 3 January 1809 – The settlement of the Bouillon succession is ratified by Emperor Napoleon.
- 30 May 1814 – Bouillon is transferred to France's department of Ardennes.
- 1815 – The Congress of Vienna grants Bouillon to William Grand Duke of Luxembourg and King of the United Kingdom of the Netherlands until the final settlement of the succession dispute between Philippe d'Auvergne (a British admiral by that time) and Charles Alain Gabriel de Rohan (an Austrian general and the last duke's closest relative on his paternal side).
- 18 September 1816 – Philippe d'Auvergne, ruined by the succession disputes, commits suicide, but the litigations concerning Bouillon drag on inconclusively until 1825.

Books about Bouillon

- Other People's Countries: A Journey into Memory, by the Bouillon-born British writer, Patrick McGuinness

== Geography ==
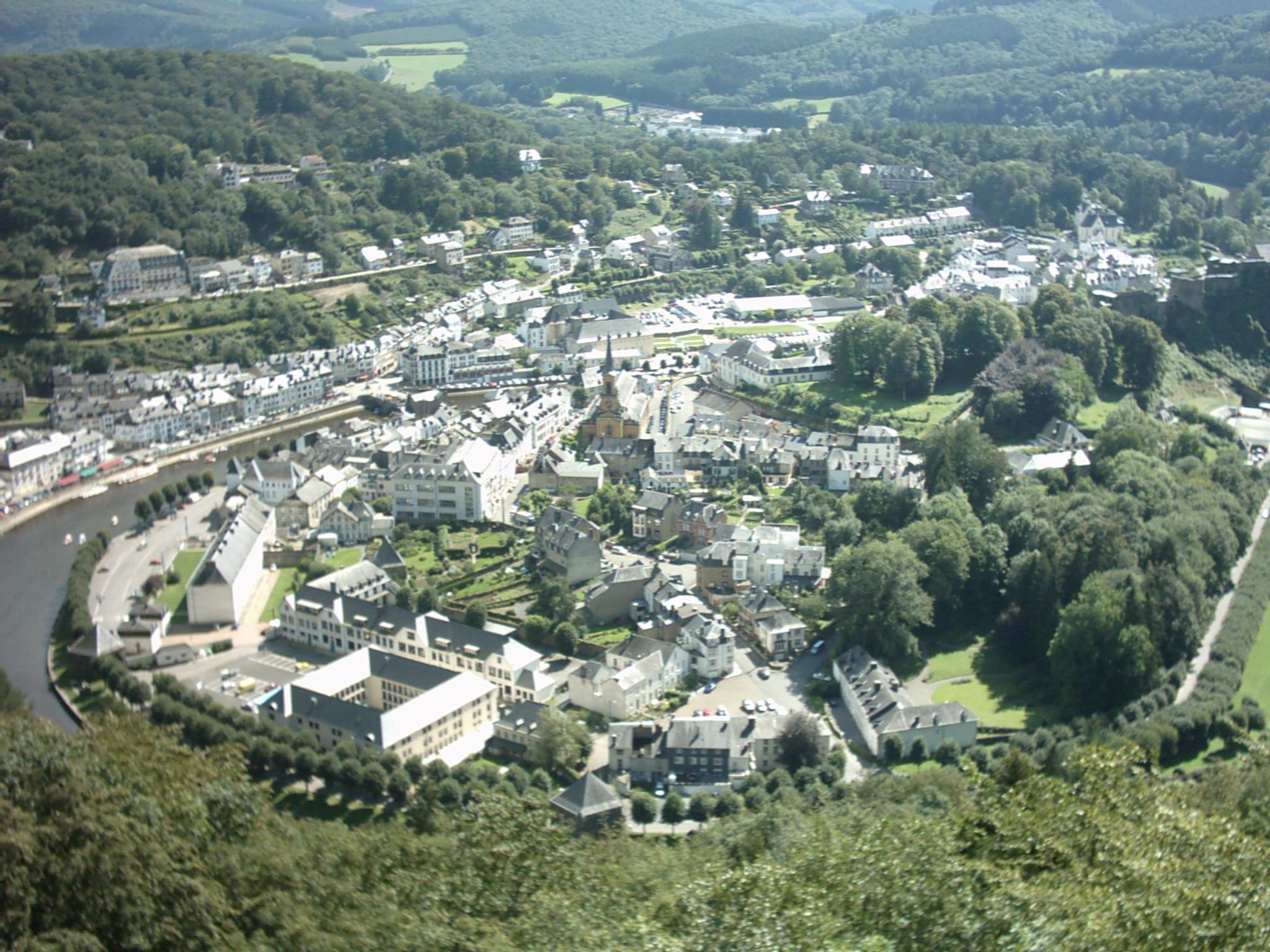
A view over Bouillon

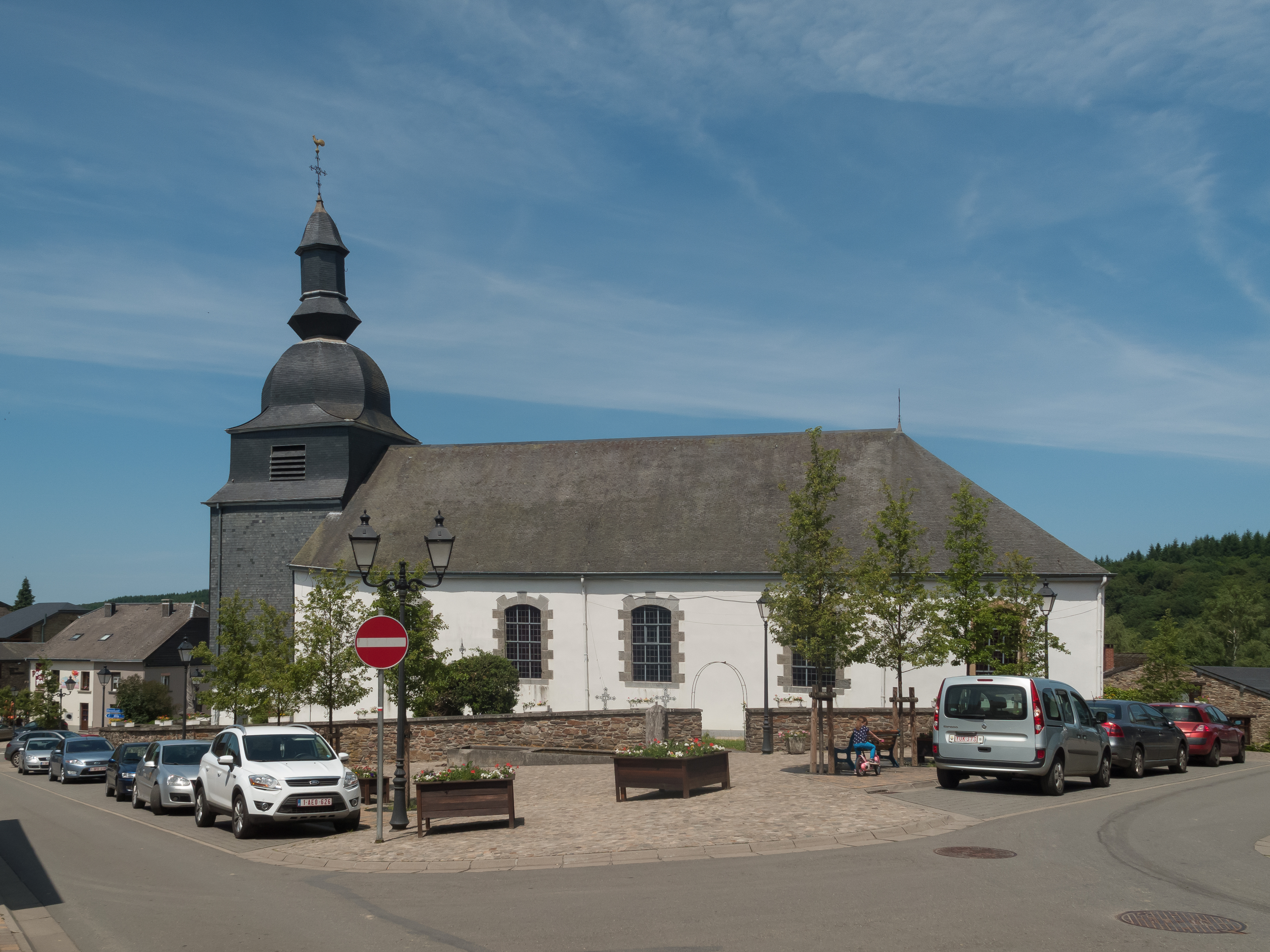
Rochehaut, church: l'église Saint-Firmin

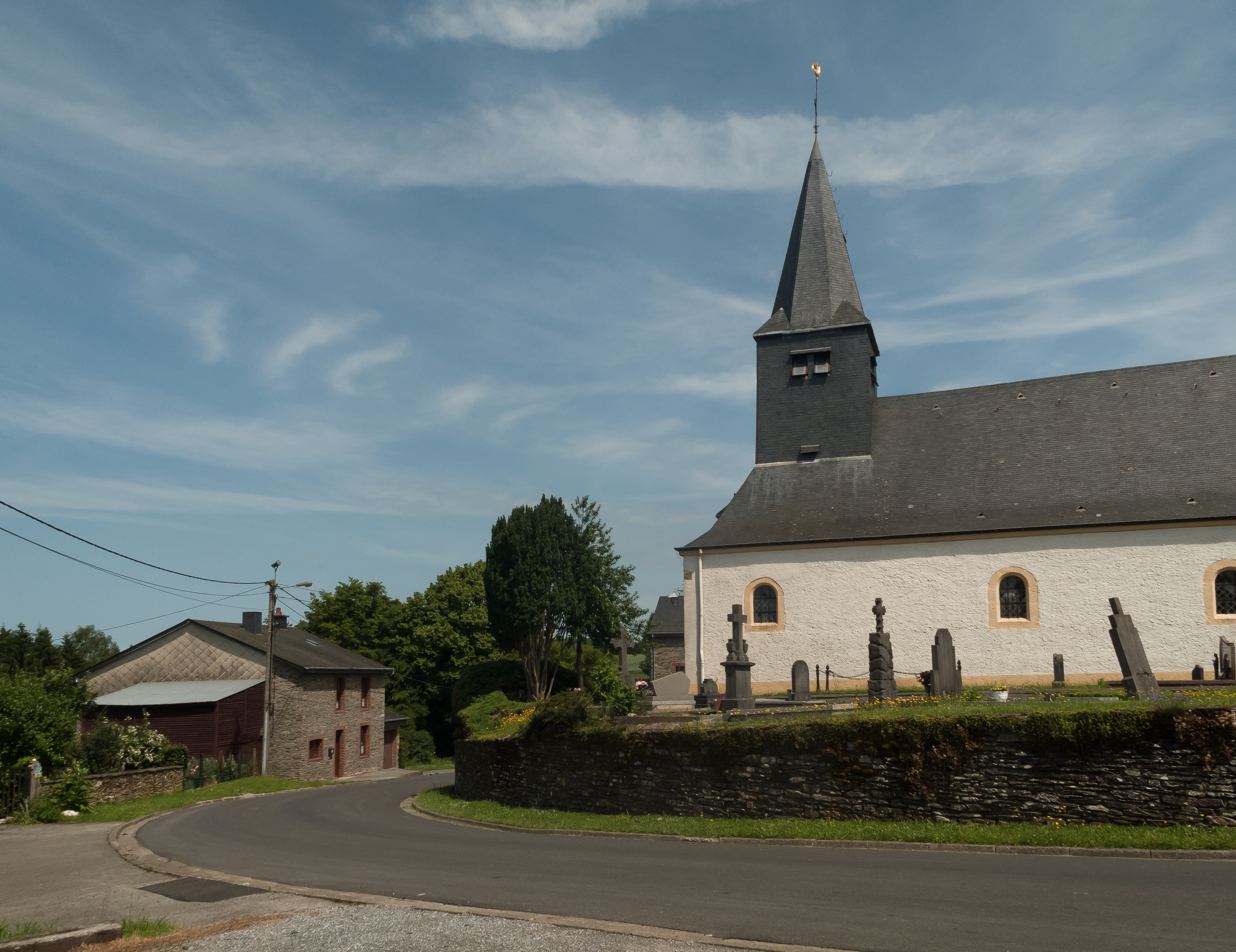
Sensenruth, church (l'église Saint-Lambert) in the street

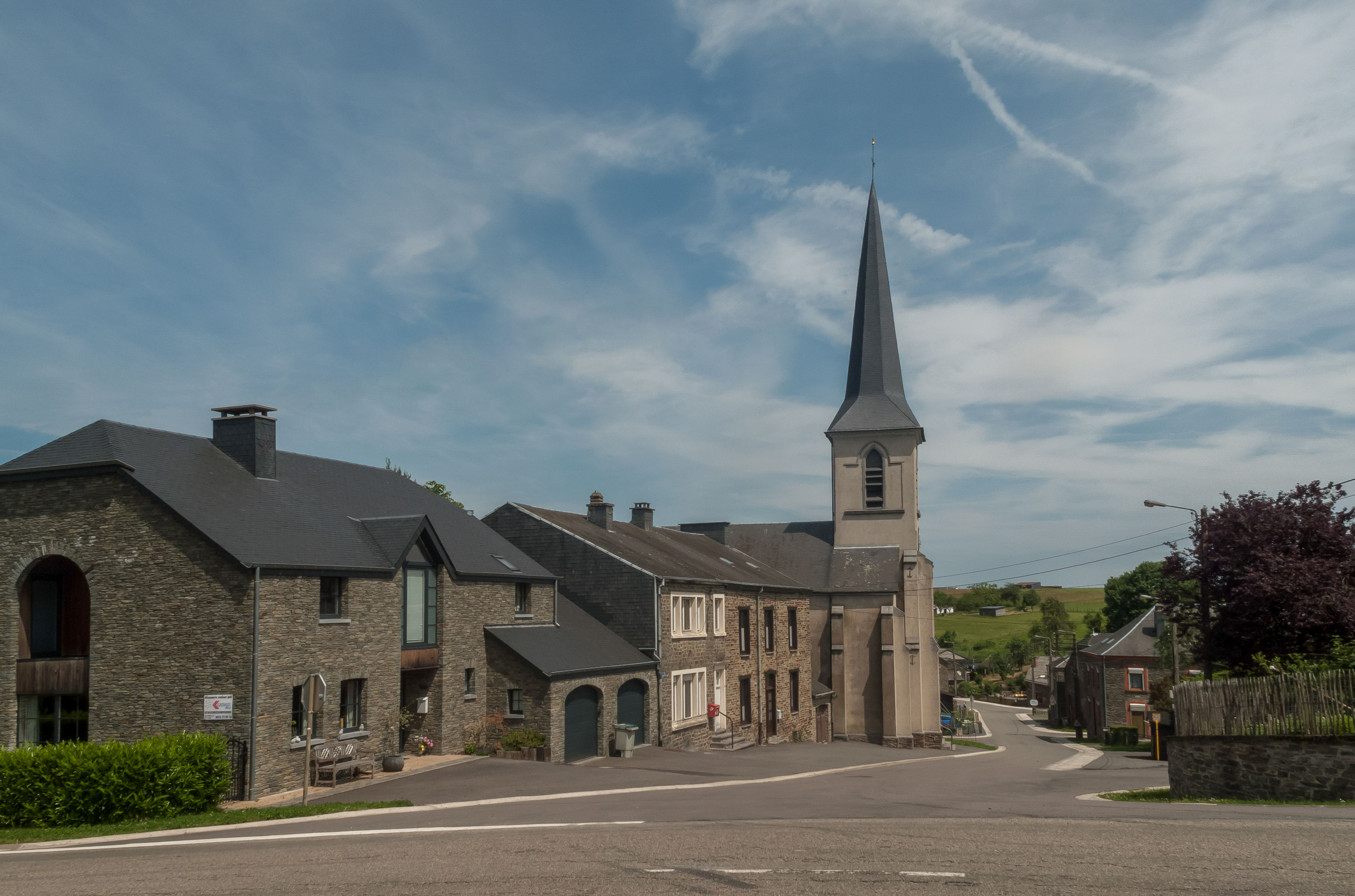
Mogimont, church: l'église des Saints-Pierre-et-Paul

The town sits in a sharp bend of the river Semois (German: Sesbach, Walloon: Simwès, in France: Semoy) whose total length is 210 km. The surrounding area is largely forested.

Bouillon has a few schools, a collège (middle school) and a lycée (high school), banks and a town square. Bouillon Castle still sits above the town centre, and is a popular tourist attraction.

=== Villages ===
population centers include:

- Botassart
- Curfoz
- Frahan
- Mogimont
- Ban d'Alle
- Bas Dohan
- Beauchenai
- Bèrôpré
- Bodimont
- Boulet
- Briahan
- Château-le-Duc
- Claimont
- Closures
- Combra
- Dessus le Moulin
- Germauchamps
- Grand Hez
- Gros Hêtre
- L'Espérance
- La Boûle
- La Cornette
- La Charité
- La Gemelle
- La Heurette
- La Justice
- La Patte d'Oie
- La Pichelotte
- La Ramonette
- Lauwé
- Laviot
- Le Ban
- Le Bondon
- Le Couroi
- Le Soyisse
- Le Stayi
- Les Blancs Cailloux
- Les Champs Bouloi
- Les Côtes
- Les Crêtes de Frahan
- Les Différends
- Les Enclaves
- Les Longs Champs
- Les Quatre Chemins
- Les Sentinés
- Les Trois Fontaines
- Loveté
- Menuchenet
- Merleux Han
- Mohan
- Moulin du Bochet
- Pré Hoc
- Remifontaine
- Rond le Duc
- Rond Napoléon
- Scotifontaine
- Tirifontaine
- Vardon

== Historical population ==
Year	Population	Area	Density
2002	5,393 (2,649 males and 2,744 females)	148.94 km^{2}	36.21/km^{2}

== Notable people ==
- Godfrey of Bouillon, knight, leader of the First Crusade
- Charles van Lerberghe wrote two major works while living here
- Philippe Albert, footballer, was born here in 1967.
- Léon Degrelle, Walloon politician and Nazi collaborator, was born here in 1906.
- Patrick McGuinness, British-Belgian author
- Madeleine Ozeray, stage and film actress

== See also ==
- List of protected heritage sites in Bouillon
