= Dohan =

Village in Wallonia, Belgium

Coordinates: 49°48′N 5°09′E

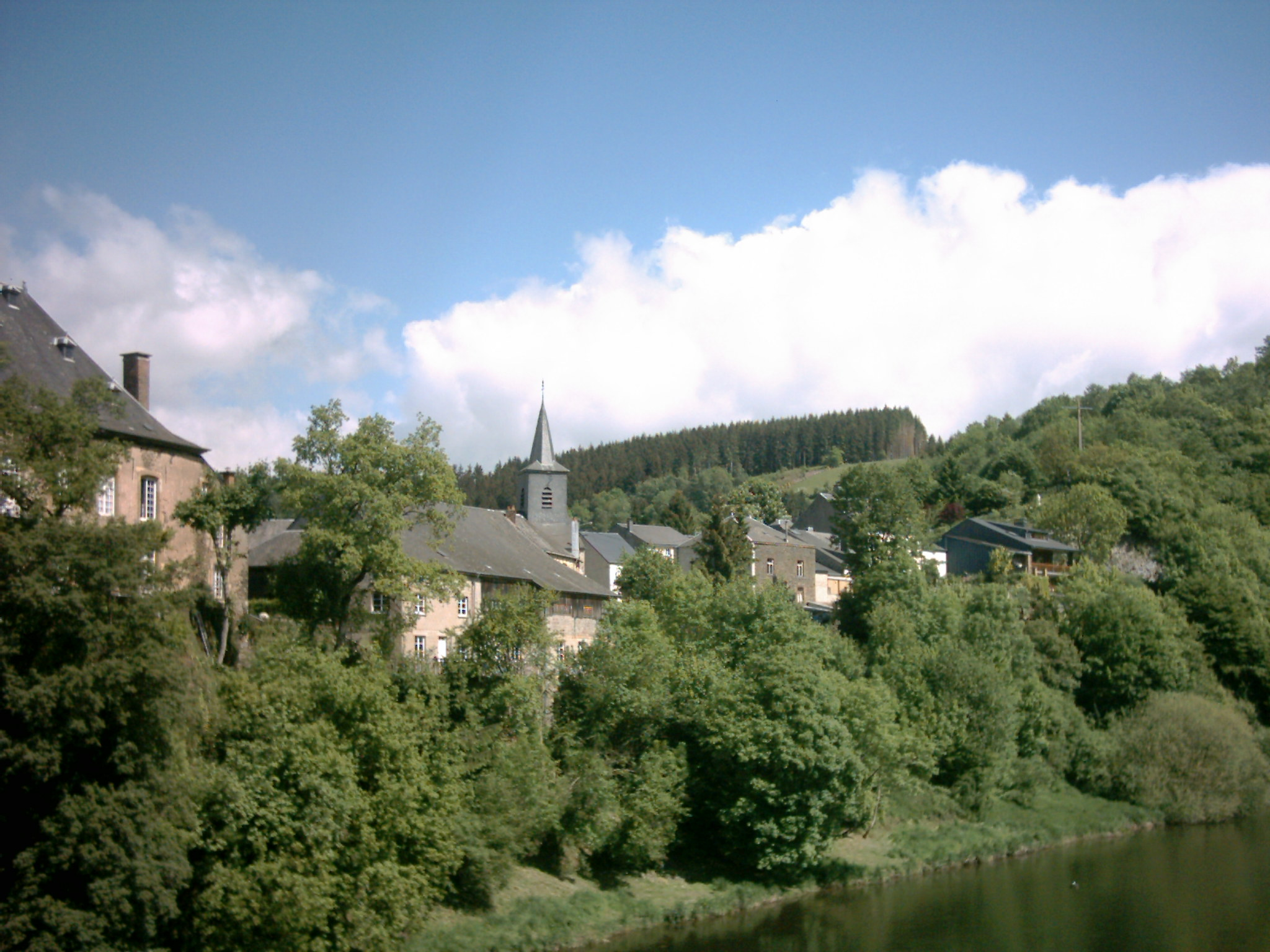
View of Dohan-sur-Semois, including the ferme-château

Dohan (French pronunciation: [dɔɑ̃]; Walloon: Dôhan), sometimes known as Dohan-sur-Semois, is a village in Wallonia, Belgium. Dohan is a district of the municipality of Bouillon, located in the province of Luxembourg. Located in the southern Ardennes, it stands on the Semois river.

Its economy is primarily based on tourism and agriculture.

The Château de Dohan ("Dohan Castle") it a registered monument in the village. It is a fortified farmhouse, or ferme-château.
