= Gaume Natural Park =

Gaume national park in Belgium

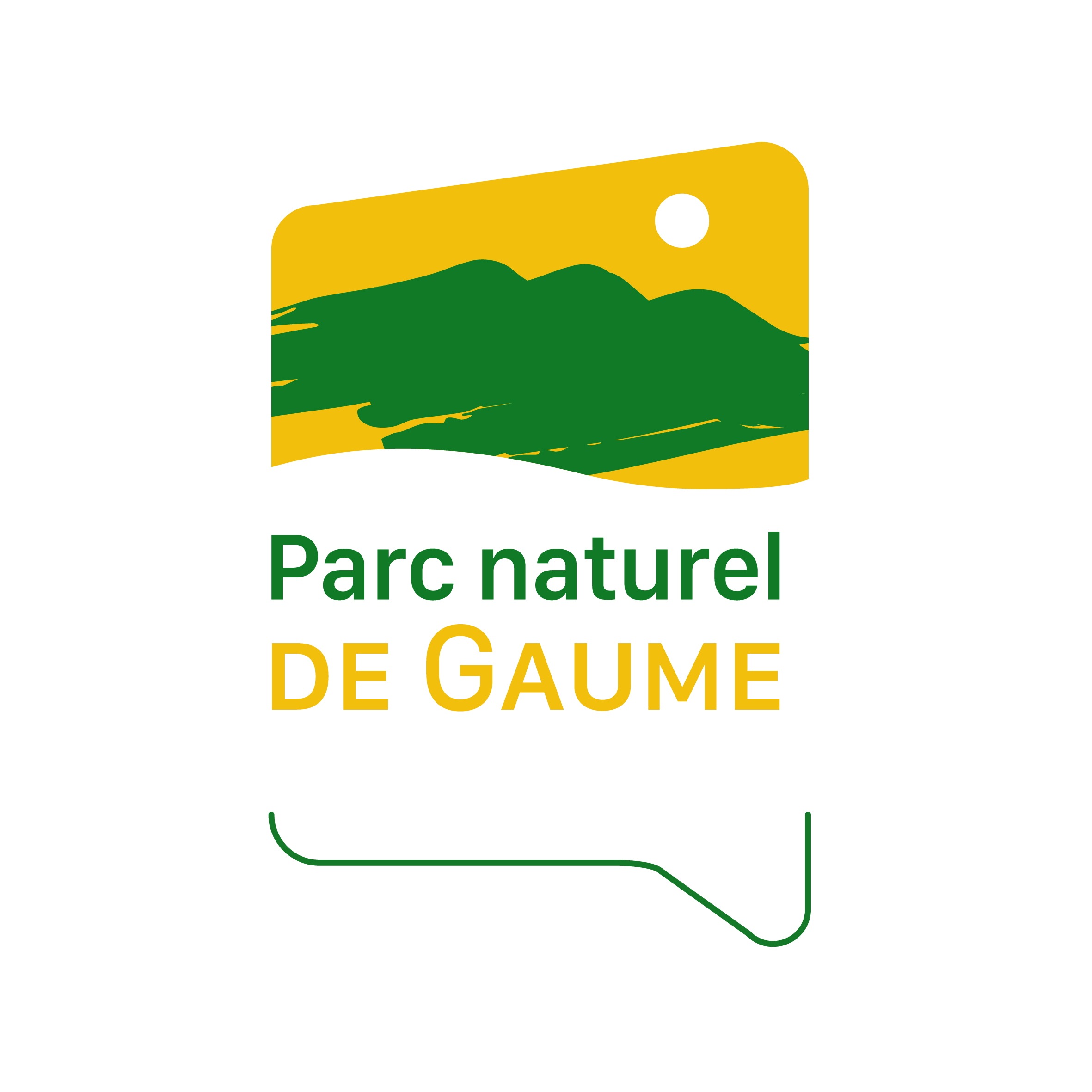
- Official logo
- Interactive map of Gaume Natural Park
- Location: Belgium
- Nearest city: Florenville and Virton
- Coordinates: 49°43′2″N 5°29′9″E
- Area: 58 104 ha
- Established: 20 December 2014
- Governing body: Walloon Region

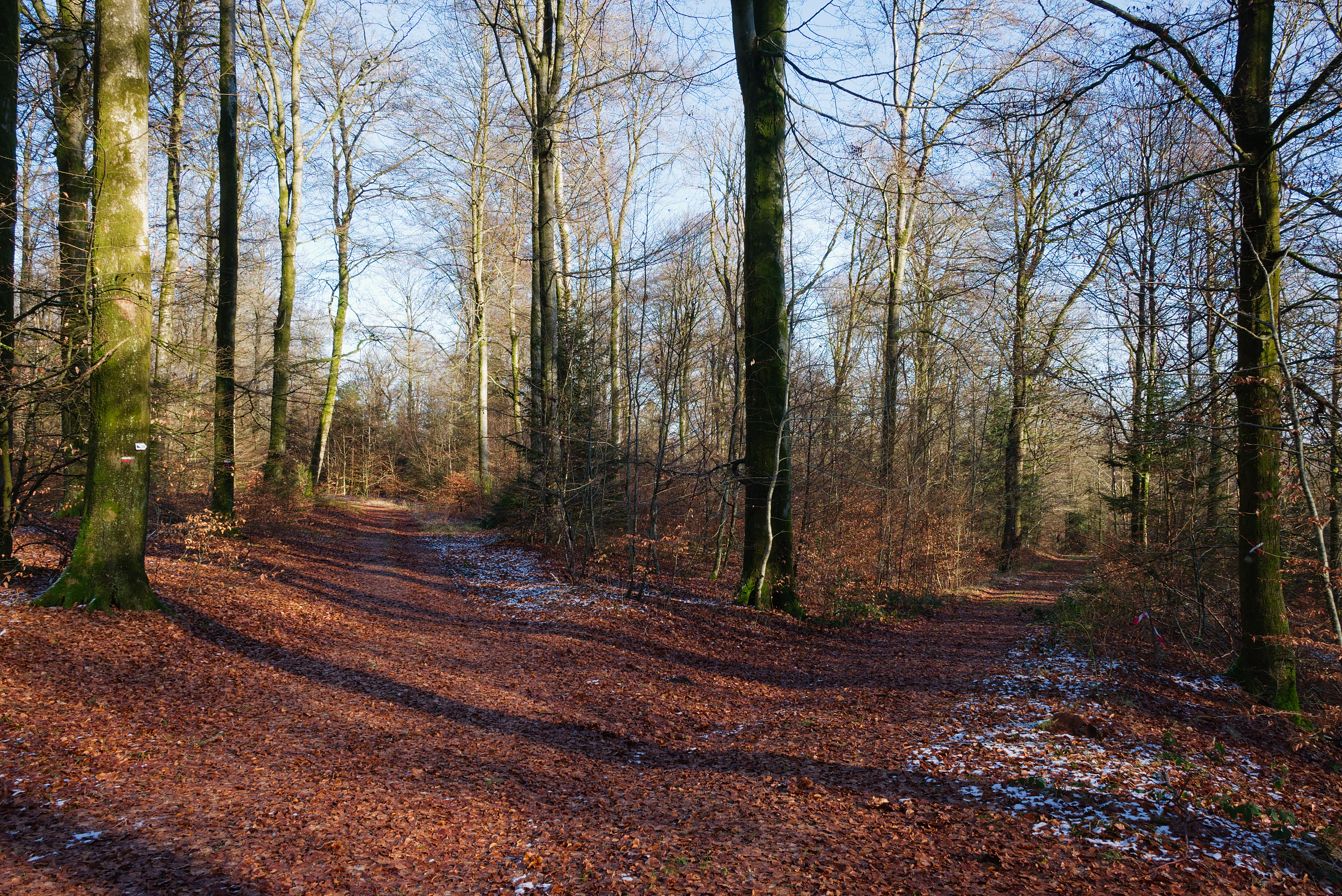
Walking trails in Florenville

Gaume Natural Park (French: Parc Naturel de Gaume) is a natural park situated in Gaume, in the Province of Luxembourg, Belgium. It was created on 18 December 2014 by the Walloon government. Covering 58104 ha, it is composed of several municipalities: Aubange (sections of Rachecourt and Halanzy), Etalle, Florenville, Meix-devant-Virton, Musson, Rouvroy, Saint-Léger, Tintigny and Virton.

== Objectives ==
The natural Park aims to value the local identity and its natural and human resources. It should improve social cohesion and quality of life in the villages. It makes it easier for information to circulate, coordinate initiatives, federate actions.

It should also make it possible for young peoples to have to possibility to live and work in Gaume, by using the know how of the region. It helps the project managers in their steps, share their means of action and give advice.

Finally, it looks forward to sensitize inhabitants to their natural, cultural and other treasures.
