= Cornejo =

Cornejo is a Spanish surname meaning someone who lived by a Dogwood tree or who lived in one of several places called Cornejo. It may refer to:

- Aldo Cornejo (born 1955), Chilean politician
- Alfredo Cornejo (boxer) (1933–2021), Chilean boxer
- Alfredo Cornejo (politician) (born 1962), Argentine politician
- Antonio Cornejo Polar (1936–1997), Peruvian-born academic, teacher, literature and cultural critic
- Cristina Cornejo (politician) (born 1982), Salvadoran politician and feminist activist
- Cristina Cornejo (weightlifter) (born 1985), Peruvian weightlifter
- Cristina Kotz Cornejo, Argentine-American director and screenwriter
- Diego Borja Cornejo or Diego Borja, Ecuadorian economist and politician
- Eduardo Cornejo, Chilean boxer
- Enrique Cornejo (born 1956), Peruvian politician
- Erica Cornejo (born 1978/79), Argentine ballet dancer, sister of Herman Cornejo
- Fernanda Cornejo (born 1989), Ecuadorian fashion model and beauty queen
- Fernando Cornejo (footballer, born 1969) (1969–2009), Chilean footballer
- Fernando Cornejo Miranda (born 1995), Chilean footballer, son of Fernando Cornejo
- Francisco Cornejo (1892–1963), Mexican painter and sculptor specializing in Maya and Aztec themes
- Francisco Javier Cornejo (1669–1750), Spanish military commander of the Spanish navy
- Gerardo Cornejo Murrieta (1937–2014), Mexican writer
- German Cornejo & Gisela Galeassi, Argentine Tango dance duo
- Guillermo Cornejo (1919–1990), Peruvian sports shooter
- Héctor Cornejo Chávez (1918–2012), Peruvian politician, jurist and writer
- Herman Cornejo (born 1981), Argentine ballet dancer, brother of Erica Cornejo
- Jorge Ledezma Cornejo (born 1963), Bolivian lawyer and politician
- José María Cornejo (1788–1864), Salvadoran politician
- Juan Cornejo (born 1990), Chilean footballer
- Karla Cornejo Villavicencio (born 1989), Ecuadorian-American writer
- Luciano Cornejo Barrera (born 1959), Mexican politician
- Manuela Cornejo Sanchez (1854–1902), Argentine composer
- Mardie Cornejo (born 1951), Major League Baseball relief pitcher
- Maria Cornejo, Chilean-American fashion designer
- Maricela Cornejo (born 1987), American boxer
- Marlón Cornejo (born 1993), Salvadoran footballer
- Miguel R. Cornejo (1888–1984), Mayor of the City of Pasay, Philippines
- Nate Cornejo (born 1979), American baseball player
- Oscar Roberto Cornejo (born 1983), Argentine footballer
- Patricio Cornejo (born 1944), Chilean tennis player
- Pedro Cornejo de Pedrosa (1536–1618), Spanish Carmelite, theologian, professor of the University of Salamanca
- Pedro Duque y Cornejo (1677–1757), Spanish Baroque painter and sculptor of the Sevillian school of sculpture
- René Cornejo (born 1962), Peruvian politician
- Robert Cornejo (born 1983), American politician (R-MO)
- Rosa Elena Cornejo Pazmiño (1874–1964), Ecuadorian Roman Catholic nun, known as María Francisca of the Wounds
- Wendy Cornejo (born 1993), Bolivian racewalker

== See also ==
- 8447 Cornejo (provisional designation: 1974 OE) is a main-belt minor planet
- Coronel Cornejo, town and municipality in Salta Province in northwestern Argentina
- Sastreria Cornejo, company that specialises in costumes for film, television and theater
- Cornedo (disambiguation)
- Cornelio (disambiguation)
- Cornetto (disambiguation)
- Coroneo
