= Cornett (disambiguation) =

The cornett, cornetto, or zink is an early wind instrument.

Cornett may also refer to:

- Cornett (surname)
- Cornett, Herefordshire, hamlet in Herefordshire, England
- Cornette, a historical military term (spelled cornett), from the French language for a "small cavalry unit", its guidon, or its lowest ranking officer, the cornet

== See also ==
- Cornet (disambiguation)
- Cornetto (disambiguation)
- Cornette (disambiguation)
