= Cornette (disambiguation) =

A cornette is a piece of female headwear.

Cornette may also refer to:

- Antoine-Louis Cornette (1860-1936), French clergyman
- Claude-Melchior Cornette (1744 – 1794), French chemist and physician
- Deimantė Cornette (born 1989), Lithuanian chess-player
- Frédéric Cornette (born 1967), French athlete
- Jim Cornette (born 1961), American professional wrestling manager
- Junior Cornette (born 1966), Guyanese sprinter
- Marcelle Lentz-Cornette (1927 – 2008), Luxembourg politician
- Matthieu Cornette (born 1985), French chess-player
- Quentin Cornette (born 1994), French soccer player

== See also ==
- La Cornette, village in Belgium
- La Cornette (farce), a play
- Cornet (rank), former cavalry rank
- Cornett, a medieval/Renaissance musical instrument
- Cornett (surname)
- Cornet (disambiguation)
