= Cornet (disambiguation) =

A cornet is a brass instrument that closely resembles the trumpet.

Cornet or Kornet may also refer to:

== Military ==
- Cornet (rank), a commissioned officer rank in cavalry troops, once the bearer of the Troop's flag or Cornet
- 9M133 Kornet, a Russian anti-tank guided missile
- Fähnrich, an Austrian and German officer candidate rank since 1899, previously a Cornet (who carried the cornet/flag) c. 1480 in Germany

== Name ==
- Adele Passy-Cornet (1838–1915), née Cornet, German opera singer
- Alizé Cornet (born 1990), French tennis player
- Bruno Cornet (born 1977), Paraguayan fencer
- Franziska Cornet (1808–1870), German opera singer
- George Cornet (1877–1952), Scottish water polo player
- Henri Cornet (1884–1941), French cyclist
- Jacobus Ludovicus Cornet (1815–1882), Dutch painter
- Jan Cornet (born 1982). Spanish actor
- Jordi Cornet (1965–2021). Spanish politician
- Joseph-Aurélien Cornet (1919–2004), Belgian ethnologist
- Julius Cornet (1793–1860), Austrian opera singer and theatre director
- Manu Cornet (born 1981), French cartoonist
- Maxwel Cornet (born 1996), Ivory Coast footballer
- Nicolas Cornet (1572–1663), French theologian
- Paul Cornet (1892–1977), French sculptor, teacher
- Pedro Cornet (born 1946), Paraguayan fencer
- Peeter Cornet (c. 1570 – 1633), Dutch composer
- Philippe Cornet (born 1990), French ice hockey player
- Raimon de Cornet (fl. 1324–1340), French troubadour
- Ramón Gómez Cornet (1898–1964), Argentine painter
- Severin Cornet (c. 1530 – 1582), Franco-Flemish composer

== Places ==
=== Romania ===
- Cornet, a village in Brusturi, Bihor County
- Cornet, a village in Poduri, Bacău County
- Cornet, a village in Vaideeni, Vâlcea County
- Cornet, a tributary of the Bucureșci in Hunedoara County
- Cornet, a tributary of the Holod in Bihor County
- Cornet, a tributary of the Sălătrucel in Vâlcea County

=== Elsewhere ===
- Cornet, Washington, a community in the United States
- Cornet Bay, a bay in the U.S. state of Washington
- Castle Cornet, a castle on an island (Cornet Rock) close to Guernsey
- The Cornet, a peak in the South Shetland Islands of Antarctica

== Other ==
- Cornet (hat): hennin
- Cornet (hat component): lappet
- Cornetfish
- Cornet (organ stop) (pronounced "cornay"), a composite stop on an organ consisting of the 8', 4', 2-2/3', 2', and 1-3/5' stops
- Cornet, another name for paper cone
  - Cornet, a British English synonym for ice cream cone
- Cornet (bread), a Japanese sweet bun often filled with chocolate
- The main character in the PlayStation video game Rhapsody: A Musical Adventure
- Kornet, a potato snack food in the Philippines produced by Granny Goose
- Cornet River (disambiguation)
- Cornet (sculpture), a 1984 outdoor concrete and steel sculpture by David Adickes
- The Cornet (film), a 1955 West German film

== See also ==
- Cornette, a kind of medieval headgear
- Cornett (disambiguation)
- Coronet (disambiguation)
