= Coronet (disambiguation) =

Coronet is a type of crown.

Coronet may also refer to:

== Animals ==
- Coronet or coronary band, an anatomical name for a part of a horse's leg just above the hoof.
- Coronet, several species of hummingbirds in the genus Boissonneaua
- Coronet, the moth species Craniophora ligustri
- Coronet (horse) (born 2014), Thoroughbred racehorse

== Businesses ==
- Coronet Camera Company, a British camera manufacturer in business from 1926 to 1967
- Coronet Films, a producer and distributor of American educational films in business from 1946 until the 1970s
- Coronet Industries, a phosphate company operating outside Plant City, Florida

== Music ==
- The Coronet, a music venue and former cinema in the Elephant and Castle area of London
- Epiphone Coronet, a solid-body electric guitar
- The cornet, a brass instrument

== Places ==
- Coronet Apartments, a property in West Hollywood, California
- Coronet Cinema, a cinema and former theatre in Notting Hill, London
- Coronet Peak, a popular ski mountain in Queenstown, New Zealand
- Coronet Theatre (Los Angeles), a former theatre in Los Angeles
- Coronet Theatre, former name of the Eugene O'Neill Theatre in New York (1945–1959)

== Transport ==
- Dodge Coronet, a model of full-size American automobile
- Coronet (automobile), a British three-wheel microcar
- Coronet (yacht), built in 1885
- Coronet, a yacht built in 1928 and renamed USS Opal (PYc-8) for service in the United States Navy during World War II
- USS Coronet (SP-194), a United States Navy patrol boat in commission from 1917 to 1919

== Other uses ==
- Operation Coronet, the invasion of the Japanese island of Honshū by the Allies in Operation Downfall in World War II
- Coronet (typeface), a decorative typeface
- Coronet, a model of electric typewriter manufactured by Smith-Corona
- Coronet (magazine), an American magazine
- Coronet Books, an imprint of Hodder & Stoughton
- Coronet, a brand of paper towels made by Georgia-Pacific
- Mt. Coronet, a location in the video games Pokémon Diamond and Pearl and Pokémon Platinum
- Coronet Highlands, a location in the video game Pokémon Legends: Arceus
- Coronet (bread), a Japanese sweet bread

== See also ==
- Kind Hearts and Coronets, a British film
- Cornet (disambiguation)
- Cornette
