= UFG =

UFG can refer to:

- Francisco Gavidia University (Universidad Francisco Gavidia)
- Universidade Federal de Goiás, Brazil
- Ulchi-Freedom Guardian
- United Front Games
- Upper Ferntree Gully railway station, Melbourne
