= Cristina Cornejo =

Cristina Cornejo may refer to:

- Cristina Cornejo (footballer) (born 1992), Basque footballer
- Cristina Cornejo (politician) (born 1982), Salvadoran politician
- Cristina Cornejo (weightlifter) (born 1985), Peruvian weightlifter
