= Josiah Zuro =

Russian-American pianist and conductor

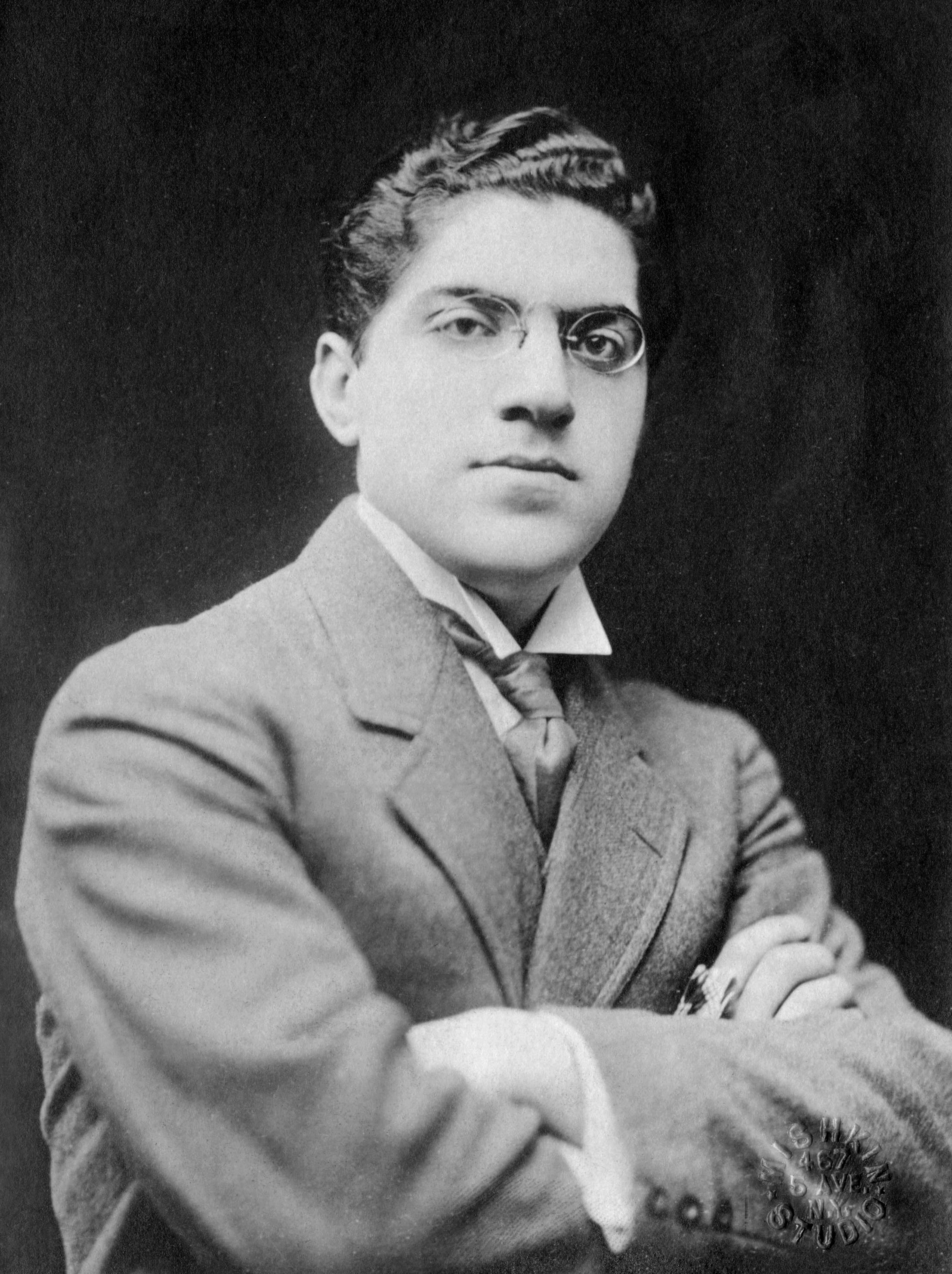
- Josiah Zuro in New York, c. 1910-1920
- Born: 27 November 1887; Białystok, Russia
- Died: October 18, 1930 (aged 42); La Jolla, California, United States
- Burial place: Mount Lebanon Cemetery
- Education: Odesa Conservatory
- Occupations: Pianist, conductor
- Known for: Film scores

Josiah Zuro (27 November 1887, in Białystok – October 18, 1930, in La Jolla, California) was a Russian-American pianist, conductor and film composer.

== Early life ==
Josiah Zuro was the son of Louis Zuro, a Russian immigrant who became a producer of opera and Josiah's collaborator, and Leah Zuro. Josiah studied music at the conservatory in Odessa before immigrating to the US in April 1906.

== Conductor ==
Zuro directed orchestras and opera companies in New York and Boston. He was assistant conductor at the Manhattan Opera House in Oscar Hammerstein I's company. He was also musical director at several New York theatres. He directed grand opera in San Francisco in 1915 while the World's Fair was being held there.

== Free Concerts ==
Zuro was widely known in New York for his efforts to bring classical music to the public at nominal charge and for his aid to young American musicians who found it difficult to get a hearing in public. For several seasons he conducted free Sunday concerts at New York theatres, organizing in 1924 the Sunday Symphony Society. Zuro himself directed an orchestra of sixty-four musicians and rehearsed the soloists who were to appear each week. His idea of giving the concerts on Sunday was to provide a closer tie between music and religion, and each performance was accompanied by a speech by some person prominent in public life, usually a minister.

In 1924 John Haynes Holmes characterized the Sunday performances as a "ministry of music", adding that "this service, religious in character, rises to a plane of dignity and beauty which makes musicians priests of the loveliest of arts." Zuro also organized a New York opera company of his own, known as the Zuro Opera Company, and made several tours. In the summer of 1925 he managed a free municipal opera project, producing three open-air operas in Ebbets Field, Brooklyn, before large crowds.

== Film Composer ==
In the 1920s, Zuro moved to Hollywood to compose for Paramount Pictures and Pathé Studios movies, among them The Covered Wagon (1923), The King of Kings (1927), The Jazz Age (1929), High Voltage (1929), and Holiday (1930). He was chosen in 1929 to supervise the movie production of seven grand operas.

== Death ==
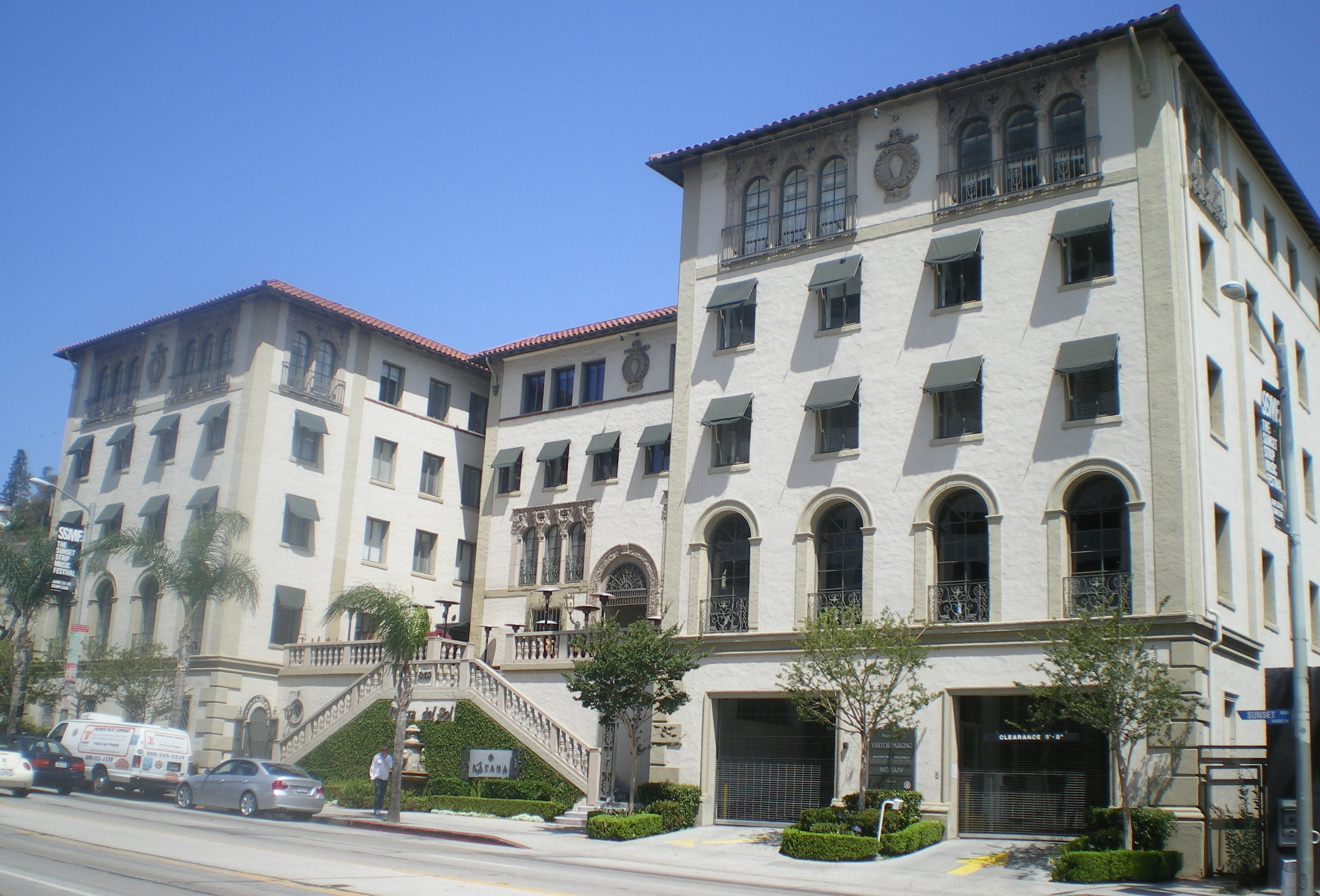
Hacienda Arms (Piazza del Sol), West Hollywood, home of Josiah Zuro and Oscar Potoker in 1930

Zuro died in an ambulance on the way to Scripps Memorial Hospital at La Jolla, California, on Saturday night, October 18, 1930, having been injured when the car he was driving left the highway and overturned on Torrey Pines Road north of San Diego. He was 42 years old.

The film composer Oscar Potoker was a passenger and was injured but survived. Zuro and Potoker had both lived in the same building, 8439 Sunset Blvd, Hacienda Arms Apartments, according to the 1930 US census. Funeral services for Zuro were held at the Glasband & Groman Mortuary in Los Angeles; the body was taken to New York for burial by train the following day. Josiah Zuro is interred in Mount Lebanon Cemetery, Queens, New York, Block C, Section 15.
