= Irma Amaya =

Salvadorian activist

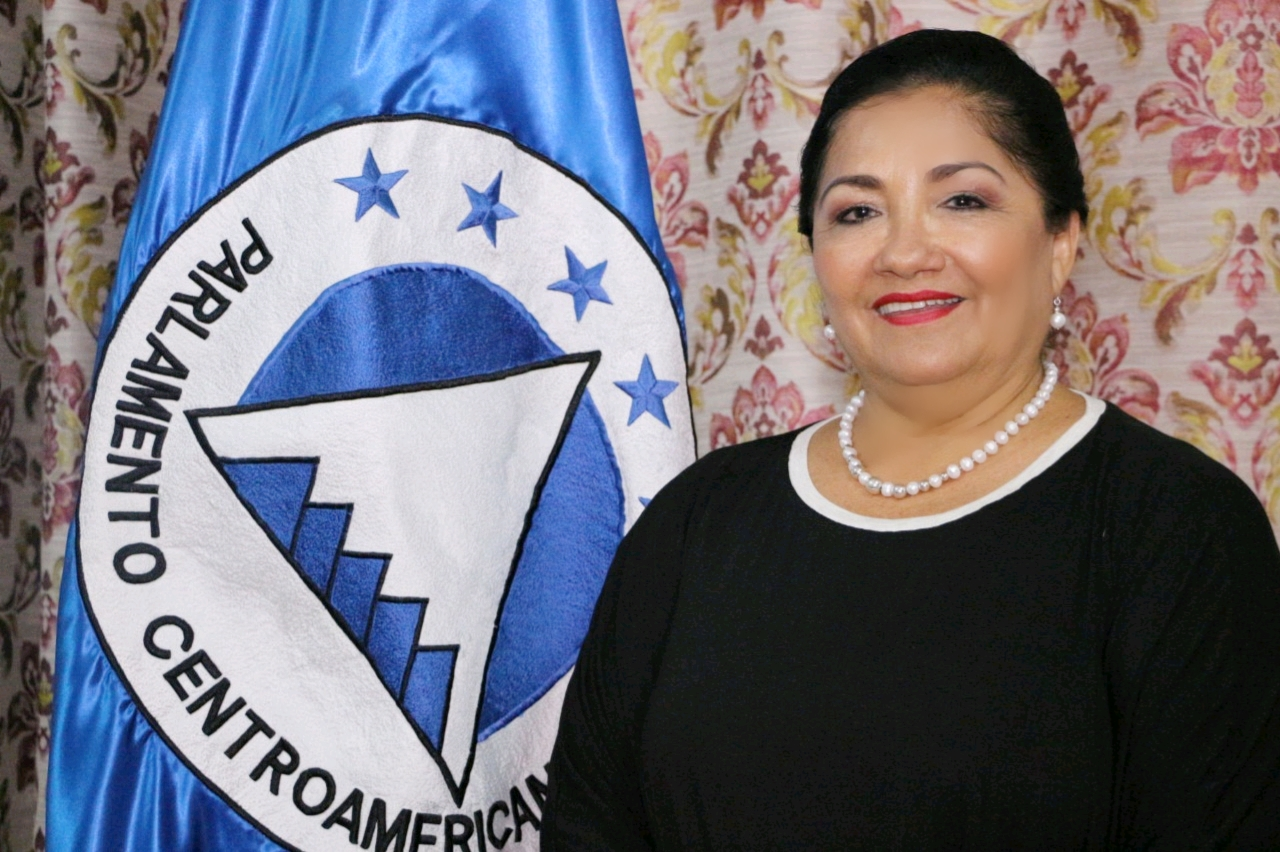

Member of the Central American Parliament
- Incumbent
- Assumed office 2011
- Constituency: El Salvador

President of the Central American Parliament
- In office 2018–2019
- Preceded by: Tony Raful Tejada
- Succeeded by: Juan Alfonso Fuentes Soria

Deputy of the Legislative Assembly of El Salvador
- In office 1997–2009

Personal details
- Born: Irma Segunda Amaya Echeverría; 28 June 1961 (age 65)
- Party: Farabundo Martí National Liberation Front
- Children: Cristina Cornejo
- Education: Universidad Nueva San Salvador
- Website: www.irmaamaya.com

Irma Segunda Amaya Echeverría (born 28 June 1961) is a Salvadoran feminist, human rights activist, former guerrilla fighter, and politician. She was a member of the Legislative Assembly of El Salvador and the first Salvadoran female President of the Central American Parliament (PARLACEN) for the term 2018–2019.

She is currently Central American Deputy for the State of El Salvador for her second consecutive term and National Women's Secretary of the Farabundo Martí National Liberation Front (FMLN)

== Early life ==
Irma Amaya joined the basic ecclesial communities (BECs) in the late 1970s. Subsequently, she joined the Fuerzas Populares de Liberación Farabundo Martí (FPL), one of the five armed organizations that formed the FMLN guerrillas in 1980. During the Salvadoran Civil War, she adopted the nom de guerre Carolina, and lived in hiding until the signing of the Chapultepec Peace Accords.

== Career ==
In 1992 she founded the Mélida Anaya Montes Women's Movement Association (Las Mélidas) within the framework of the Peace Accords, and has been an activist for the organization ever since. She was president of its board of directors for the term 2015–2019.

Amaya was a national deputy of the Legislative Assembly of El Salvador for three consecutive terms, from 1997 to 2009, joining the Justice and Human Rights Commission and the Electoral and Constitutional Reforms Commission. She was also a legislative advisor on gender and women's rights from 2009 to 2011.

She earned a licentiate in legal sciences from the Universidad Nueva San Salvador in 2013.

She served as president ad honorem of the government's Injured and Disabled Protection Fund (FOPROLYD) for two consecutive terms, from 2009 to 2019. She was initially appointed by President Mauricio Funes, and ratified during the term of Salvador Sánchez Cerén. Under her management, FOPROLYD made a payment on the historical debt that the Salvadoran state owed the beneficiary population from 1993 to 1995, giving said cancellation to 46 beneficiaries, for a total amount of $92,528.60.

A PARLACEN deputy elected for two consecutive terms, from 2011 to 2021, Amaya has served as president of the Committee on International Relations and Migration Affairs (2016–2017), secretary of the Board of Directors (2017–2018), and president of the Board of Directors (2018–2019), becoming the first Salvadoran woman to hold the latter post. She was elected to it with the widest margin of votes in the history of the regional forum.

She is a founder and member of the FMLN, and served as its Deputy National Secretary from 2001 to 2002 and Municipal Secretary of Santa Tecla from 2015 to 2019. In 2019 she became its National Women's Secretary, with a term ending in 2024.

Her daughter, Cristina Cornejo, was elected to the Legislative Assembly in 2018.
