= Blonde Venus =

1932 film

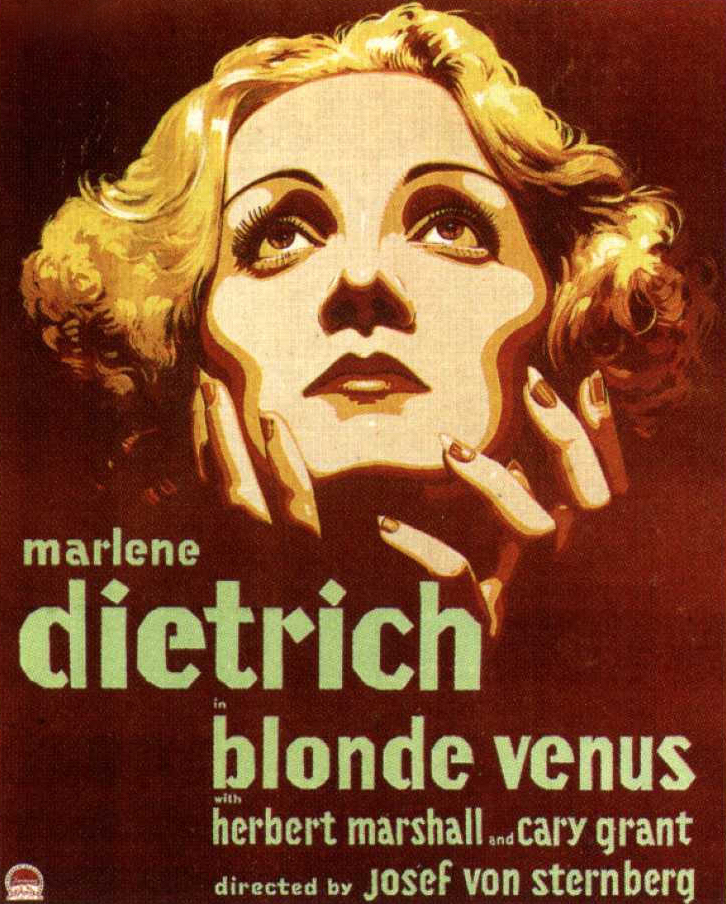
- Original theatrical release poster
- Directed by: Josef von Sternberg
- Written by: Jules Furthman; S. K. Lauren; Uncredited: Josef von Sternberg
- Based on: "Mother Love" short story by Marlene Dietrich
- Produced by: Josef von Sternberg
- Starring: Marlene Dietrich; Herbert Marshall; Cary Grant; Dickie Moore
- Cinematography: Bert Glennon
- Edited by: Josef von Sternberg (uncredited)
- Music by: W. Franke Harling; John Leipold; Paul Marquardt; Oscar Potoker
- Distributed by: Paramount Pictures
- Release date: September 16, 1932
- Running time: 94 minutes
- Country: United States
- Languages: English; German; French

Blonde Venus is a 1932 American pre-Code drama film starring Marlene Dietrich, Herbert Marshall and Cary Grant. It was produced, edited and directed by Josef von Sternberg from a screenplay by Jules Furthman and S. K. Lauren, adapted from a story by Furthman and von Sternberg. The original story "Mother Love" was written by Dietrich herself.

The musical score was by W. Franke Harling, John Leipold, Paul Marquardt and Oscar Potoker, with cinematography by Bert Glennon.

== Plot ==
Ned Faraday, an American chemist, has been inadvertently poisoned by radium and expects to die within a year, until he learns that Professor Holzapfel, a famous physician in Dresden, has developed a treatment that may be able to heal him. The night after he hears this good news, while putting his son Johnny to bed, Ned and his wife Helen recite the story of the day on which they had met. While traveling in Germany as a young man, Ned encountered Helen swimming in a pond with several other girls. She coyly told him that she would grant him a wish if he left, and Ned wished to see her again. He watched her perform onstage at a local theater and then they went for a walk and had their first kiss.

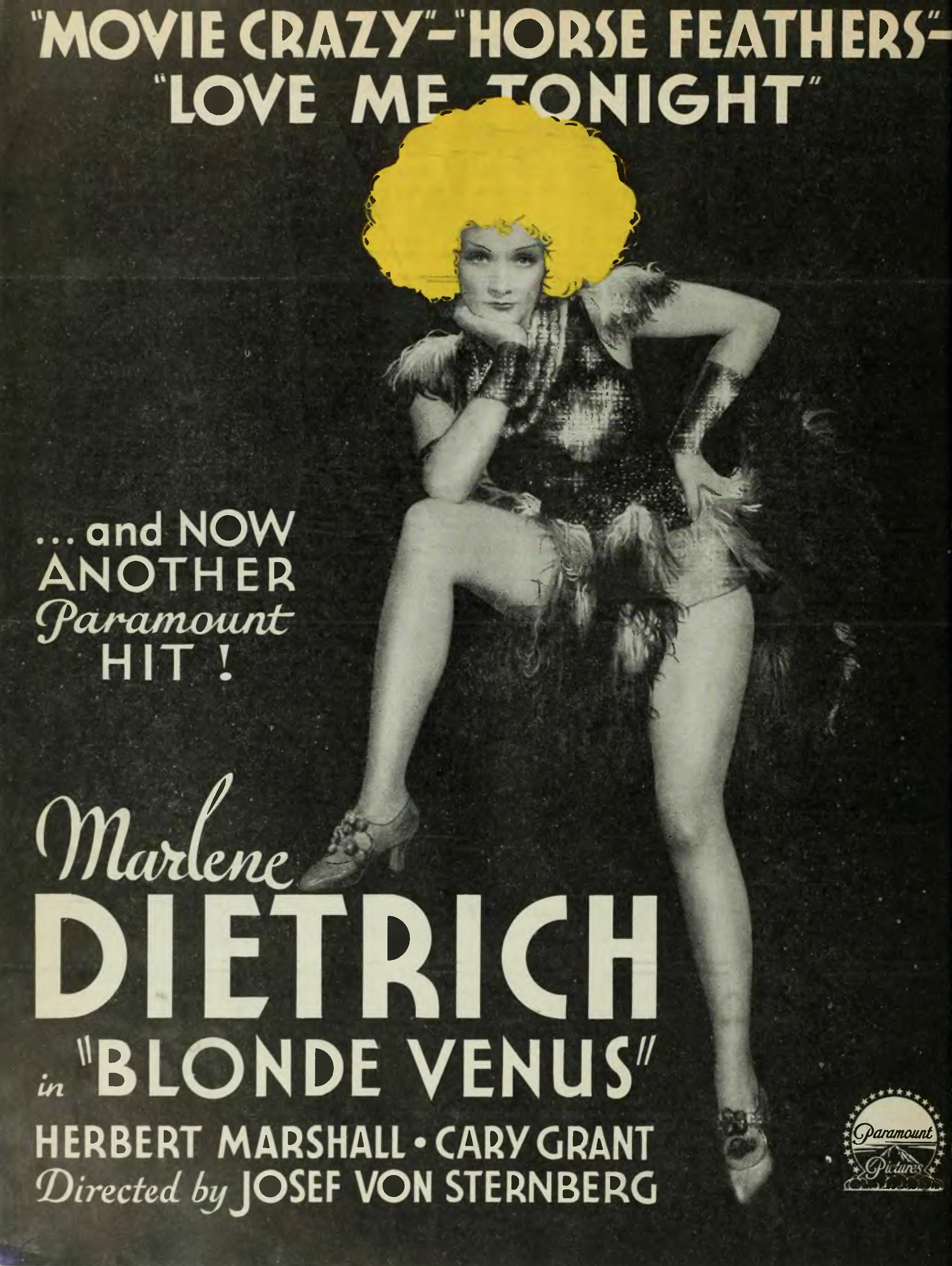
Blond Venus ad from The Film Daily, 1932

After Johnny falls asleep, Ned discusses with Helen the possibility of traveling to see Professor Holzapfel. To help pay for the trip, Helen decides to return to the stage and finds employment at a local nightclub. She befriends fellow cabaret girl Taxi, who tells her about Nick Townsend, a wealthy politician and frequent patron of the club who gave Taxi an expensive bracelet in exchange for a "favor."

Helen, billed as "blonde Venus," has a successful debut performance, singing "Hot Voodoo" surrounded by chorus girls in blackface after emerging from a gorilla suit, and is noticed by Nick. Enamored of Helen, he approaches her after the show, and the two begin to talk. Upon learning of Ned's medical condition, Nick gives Helen $300 as a down payment for Ned's treatment.

After Ned's departure for Germany, Nick offers to house Helen and Johnny in a nice apartment and support her so that she will not have to work. She and Nick develop a romance, but after learning of Ned's impending return, she tells him that she must end the relationship. The two take a two-week vacation together just prior to Ned's scheduled return date, but Ned arrives ahead of schedule and finds his home empty.

When Helen returns to her old apartment after her vacation with Nick and discovers that Ned is already there, she confesses that she has been unfaithful. Ned sarcastically thanks her for saving his life and tells her to bring Johnny to him and then leave their home, assuring her that the law will be on his side if she decides to fight for custody. Helen instead flees with Johnny, and Ned reports them missing.

While on the run, Helen initially supports herself and Johnny by performing in nightclubs. This makes her too easy to find, so she resorts to doing whatever she can to quietly subsist, such as washing dishes in exchange for meals. She is arrested for vagrancy in New Orleans and is nearly jailed because she cannot afford the fine, but the judge, learning that she has a child, releases her providing that she leave town. Eventually realizing such a lifestyle is unstable for Johnny, Helen voluntarily surrenders to a detective in Galveston, Texas. Ned collects his son and gives Helen enough money to repay what Nick had provided for his treatment.

Following an emotional breakdown, Helen begins to work relentlessly, singing and performing in cabarets. She makes her way to Paris, where she reunites with Nick when he attends one of her shows. He does not believe her when she says that she is better on her own, so he invites her to return to New York with him to see Johnny. At first she declines, but ultimately accepts.

At Ned's apartment, Nick arranges for Helen to visit Johnny and then leaves the family alone. Before Helen goes to Nick, whom she plans to marry, Johnny requests that his mother relate the story of how she met his father. She tells him to ask his father, who says that he has forgotten, so Johnny begins to tell the story himself, encouraging Ned and Helen to join him. Helen and Ned realize how their separation has affected Johnny. To help Johnny fall asleep, Helen sings a Heinrich Heine poem that she used to sing to him before bed each night. Reminded of their feelings for each other, Helen and Ned agree to reconcile.

== Cast ==
- Marlene Dietrich as Helen Faraday (stage name Helen Jones/Helen Blake/Blonde Venus)
- Herbert Marshall as Edward 'Ned' Faraday
- Cary Grant as Nick Townsend
- Dickie Moore as Johnny Faraday
- Gene Morgan as Ben Smith
- Rita La Roy as 'Taxi Belle' Hooper
- Robert Emmett O'Connor as Dan O'Connor
- Sidney Toler as Detective Wilson
- Morgan Wallace as Dr. Pierce
- Andrea Palma as Dietrich's stunt double (uncredited)
- Al Bridge as Bouncer (uncredited)
- Glen Cavender as Ship's Officer (uncredited)
- Emile Chautard as Chautard, the French nightclub manager (uncredited)
- Marcelle Corday as Helen's Maid in France (uncredited)
- Cecil Cunningham as Norfolk Woman Manager (uncredited)
- Bess Flowers as Minor Role (uncredited)
- Mary Gordon as Landlady (uncredited)
- Robert Graves as La Farge (uncredited)
- Sterling Holloway as Joe, a hiker friend of Ned in the introduction (uncredited)
- Hattie McDaniel as Cora, Helen's maid in New Orleans (uncredited)
- Charles R. Moore as Bartender
- Charles Morton as Bob (uncredited)
- Dennis O'Keefe as Minor Role (uncredited)
- Evelyn Preer as Viola (uncredited)
- Dewey Robinson as Greek Restaurant Owner (uncredited)
- Francis Sayles as Charlie Blaine (uncredited)
- Ferdinand Schumann-Heink as Henry (uncredited)
- Gertrude Short as Receptionist (uncredited)
- Larry Steers as Hotel Manager in Baltimore (uncredited)
- Jerry Tucker as Otto (uncredited)
- Lloyd Whitlock as Baltimore Manager (uncredited)

== Production ==
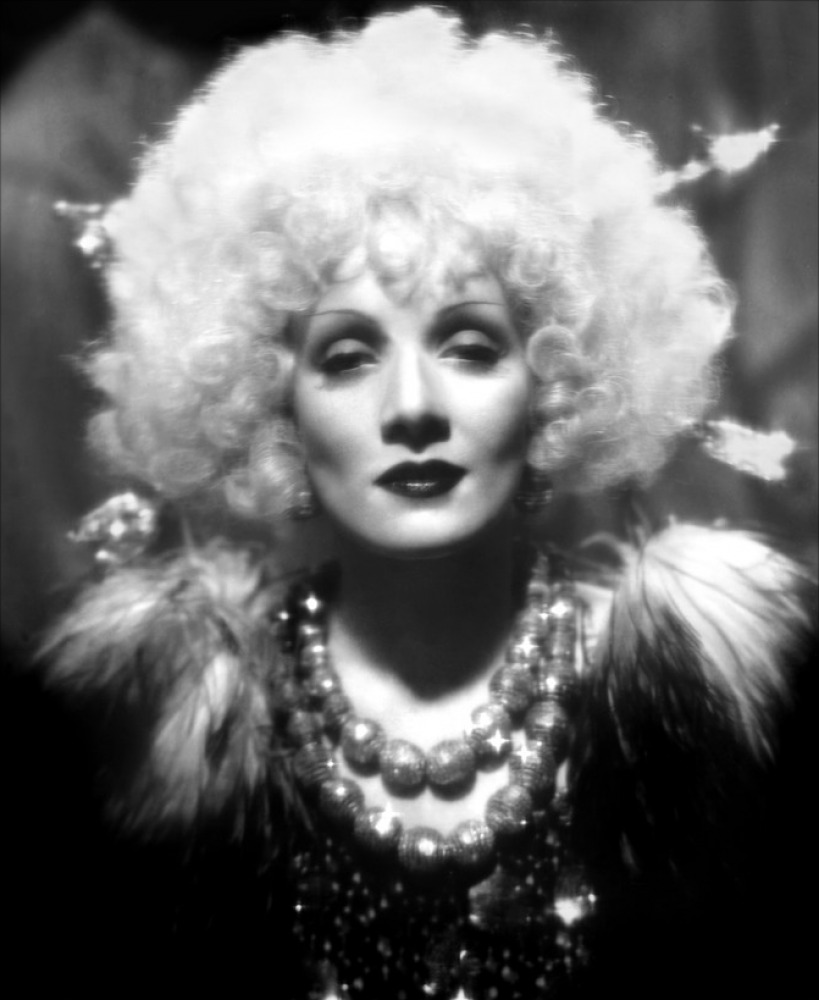
Marlene Dietrich in the film trailer

At the time of production, the Motion Picture Producers and Distributors of America (MPPDA), formed in 1922, regulated film content. The MPPDA reviewed scripts using the 1930 Motion Picture Production Code which, while banning forced prostitution, allowed characters to engage in voluntary solicitation provided that the subject be handled with care.

During negotiations between director von Sternberg and the MPPDA regarding scenes in which Helen is found by Detective Wilson in New Orleans, references to direct solicitation were removed from the script; in the finished film, the interaction between Helen and the private detective becomes ambiguous. Other plot aspects, such as adultery, remain inconsistent with the Production Code, which went unenforced until 1934. The stricter enforcement prevented Paramount from reissuing Blonde Venus after 1934.

To promote, the September 1932 film magazine Screenland published the story "The Blonde Venus" by Mortimer Franklin. This was based upon the second version of the script and not the final product, perhaps as this version was more similar to the romances that appealed to the magazine's female readers.

=== Music ===
Dietrich performs three musical numbers, including:

- "You Little So-and-So" (Sam Coslow, Leo Robin)
- "I Couldn't Be Annoyed" (Leo Robin, Richard A. Whiting)
- "Hot Voodoo" (Ralph Rainger, Coslow): Nearly eight minutes long and mostly instrumental, featuring jazz trumpet and drums. Dietrich sings toward the end.

== Reception ==
Blonde Venus received a mixed reception upon release.

Mordaunt Hall of The New York Times called it a "muddled, unimaginative and generally hapless piece of work, relieved somewhat by the talent and charm of the German actress [Dietrich] and Herbert Marshall's valiant work in a thankless role."

Jose Rodriguez of Script remarked that the theme is as "old as life, and almost as interesting," praising the "force" and "instinctive cunning" of the director.

Forsythe Hardy of Cinema Quarterly gave the film a gushing review, calling the picture "more brilliantly polished than any other America has sent us this year," Hardy praised the cinematography, writing: "For an hour the screen is filled with a succession of lovely images—finely assembled detail and imaginatively composed settings, photographed with a camera unusually sensitive."

Blonde Venus is considered a cult film. On the review aggregator website Rotten Tomatoes, 73% of 60 critics' reviews are positive.

== Sources ==
- Deschner, Donald (1973). The Complete Films of Cary Grant. Citadel Press. ISBN 0-8065-0376-9.
- Jacobs, Lea (1997). The Wages of Sin: Censorship and the Fallen Woman Film, 1928–1942. University of California Press. ISBN 0-520-20790-4.
- Staiger, Janet (2000). "The Romances of the Blonde Venus". Perverse Spectators: The Practices of Film Reception. New York University Press. ISBN 0-8147-8138-1.
