= Annie Dirkens =

German actress (1869/70–1942)

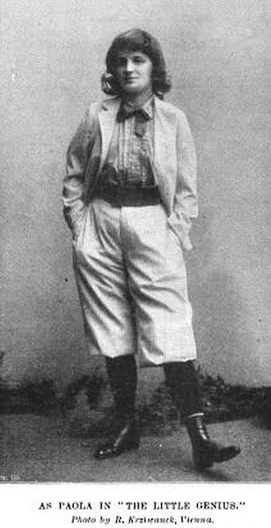
Annie Dirkens in costume as Paolo in The Little Genius, from an 1896 publication

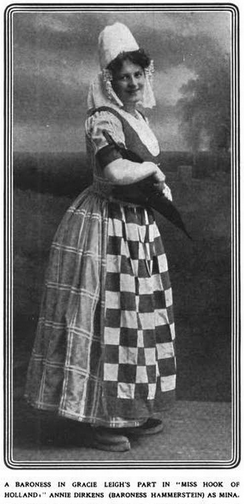
Annie Dirkens in costume as Mina in Miss Hook of Holland, from a 1907 publication

Annie Dirkens (25 September 1869 (some sources give 1870) – 11 November 1942) was a German actress and singer based in Vienna; after her marriage in 1898 she was sometimes billed as Baroness von Hammerstein.

== Early life ==
Annie Dirkens was born in Berlin as Marie Therese Drews. Her father Peter August Drews was an English railroad employee. She trained as a singer in Berlin, and with Nina Falkenberg in Dresden.

== Career ==
Annie Dirkens debuted as a singer in 1893, in Berlin. She appeared in operettas, including the lead breeches role in The Little Genius at London's Shaftesbury Theatre in 1896. "Miss Annie Dirkens sings and plays very nicely as the little genius," a reviewer commented, "and the whole play is got up in such splendid style that it will probably have a good run." in 1897 she sang the role of the Comtesse Mathilde in the premiere of Johann Strauss II's last operetta, Die Göttin der Vernunft, in Vienna.

After she acquired the title "Baroness" upon marriage, she continued to perform, appearing in Lehár's Der Rastelbinder at the Carltheater in Vienna, and in Miss Hook of Holland in Berlin in 1907. In 1906 she performed in a musical farce in German, at the Irving Place Theatre in New York. She was engaged to star in The Love Cure in New York in 1909, but she cancelled for health reasons.

During World War I, she was a volunteer nurse at various war hospitals, and also sang at Red Cross events. She was badly injured by a horse in 1918, ending her war work and her stage career. She worked at a tobacco shop after the war.

== Personal life ==
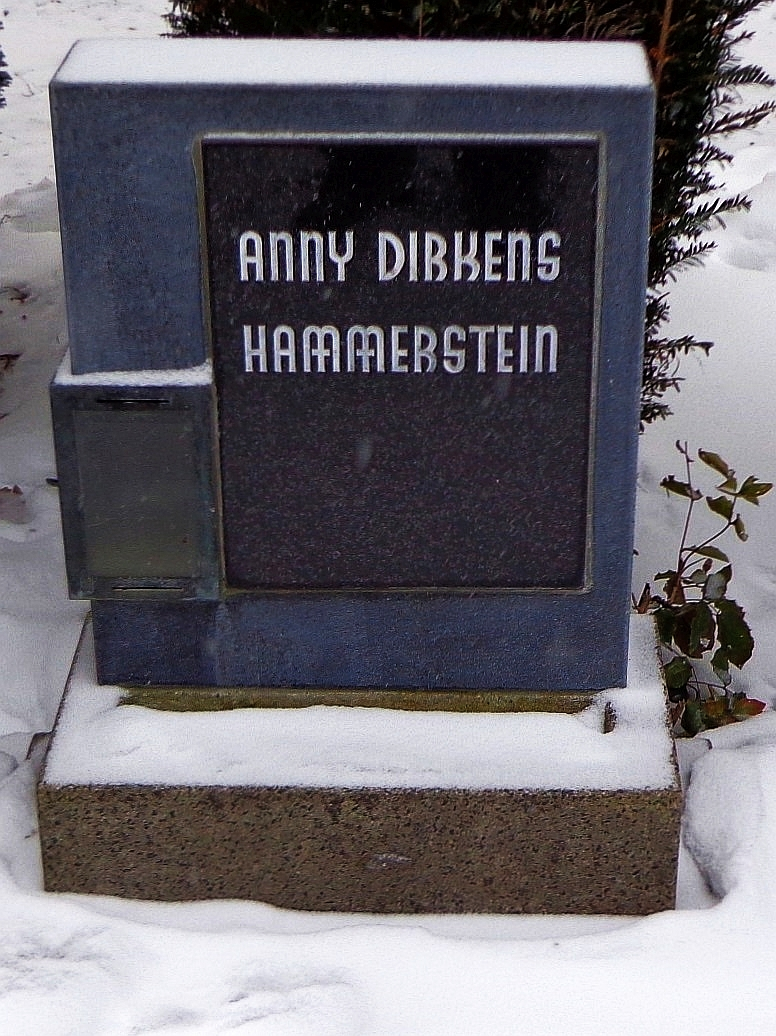
Feuerhalle Simmering - Urnenhain (Abteilung 1) - grave of Annie Dirkens

Annie Dirkens married lawyer and military officer Wilhelm Freiherr von Hammerstein-Equord, in 1898, which made her a baroness. She was widowed in 1915, when her husband died from battle injuries during World War I. She was considered a "war invalid" (Kriegsinvalidin) after a serious injury in 1918. She died in Vienna in 1942, aged 72 years. Annie Dirkens-Hammerstein's grave is in the Feuerhalle Simmering in Vienna.
