= Julie Kopacsy-Karczag =

Hungarian opera singer

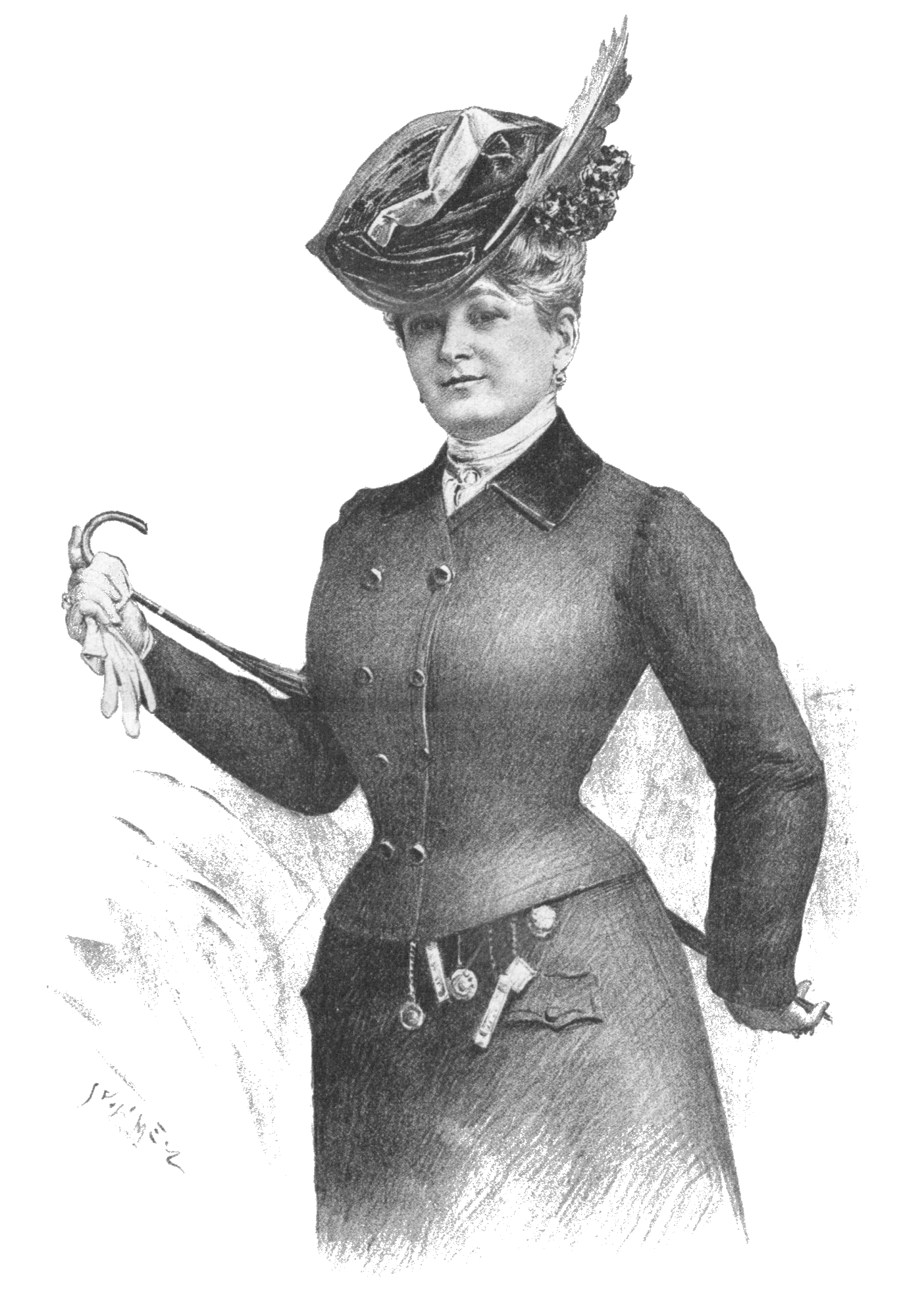
Julie Kopacsy-Karczag by Jan Vilímek (Der Humorist, 1901)

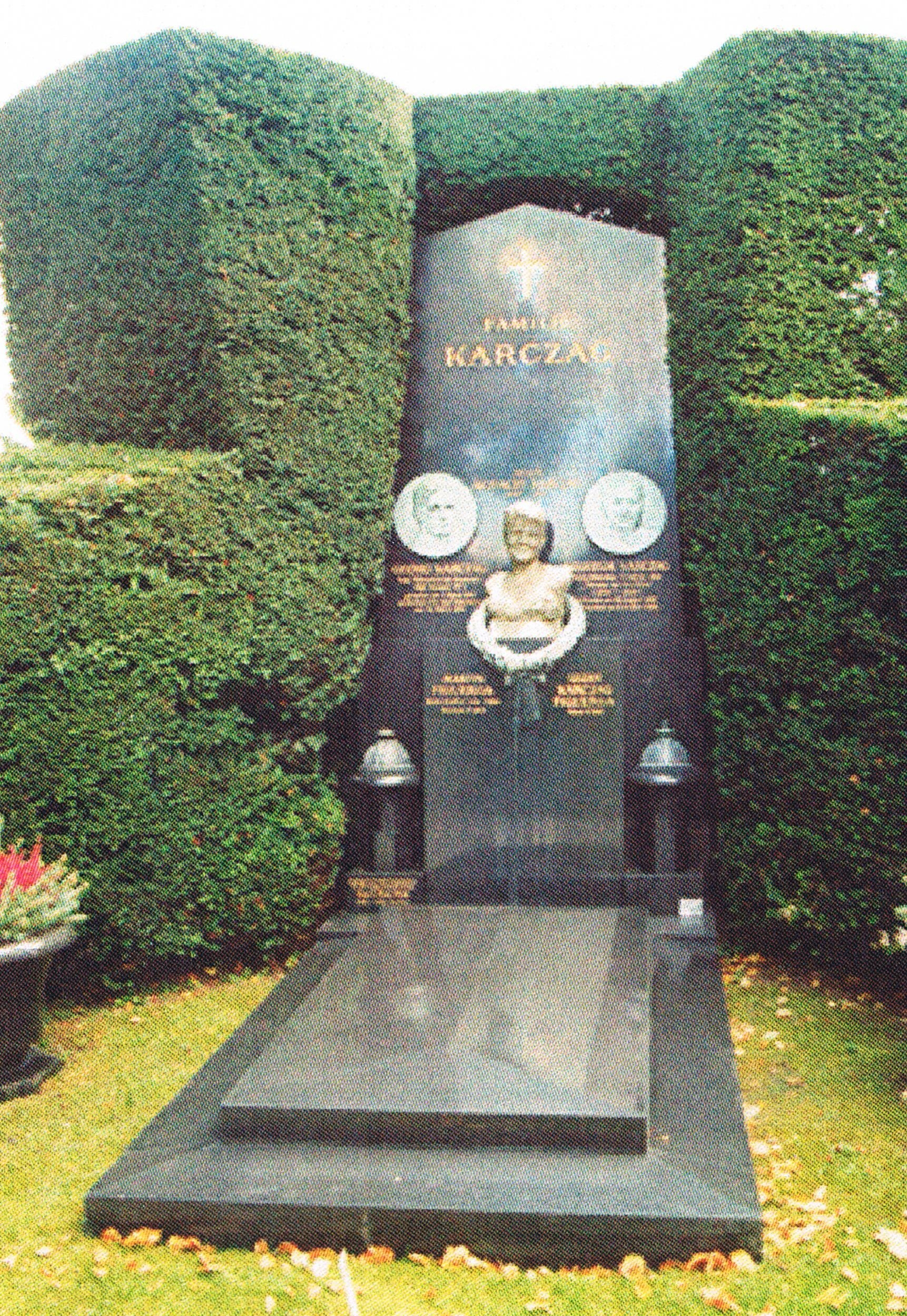
Grave of Julie Kopacsi-Karczag

Julie Kopacsy-Karczag, née Julie Kopacsy, also Julie Kopacsi or Julie Kopacsi-Karczag (b. 13 February 1867 in Komárom, Austria-Hungary [now Komárno, Slovakia] – d. 26 January 1957 in Vienna) was a Hungarian opera singer (soprano).

== Life ==
Born in Komárom, Kopacsy was sent to Pest for her vocal training as a coloratura singer with Adele Passy-Cornet.

She worked as an operetta soubrette in 1889 in Debrecen, from 1891 to 1894 at the Volkstheater in Budapest, from 1894 to 1896 at the Carltheater in Vienna. She gave guest performances in Berlin, America, Russia and Prague and was then active again in Vienna.

She was married to Wilhelm Karczag and is buried at Hietzing Cemetery, at the side of her husband .

== Main roles (selection) ==
- La belle Hélène (Jacques Offenbach).
- Lady Hamilton (Eduard Künnecke).
- Königin von Gamara (Alexander Neumann).
- Die Göttin der Vernunft (Johann Strauss II), as the singer Ernestine.
