= Jehan d'Abundance =

French poet

Jehan d'Abundance (Pont-Saint-Esprit, ? – c.1540) is the pseudonym of a French poet and author of farces. He also signed his works with the pen names Maistre Tyburce or Tyburce Dyariferos. He wrote several moralities, mysteries and farces including La Cornette, his most famous work which Antoine du Verdier mentions in his Bibliothèque française (Paris, 1773, vol. II, p. 325).

== Works ==
- La Guerre et le débat entre la langue, les membres et le ventre : c'est assavoir : la langue, les yeulx, les oreilles, le nez, les mains, les pieds quilz ne veullent plus rien bailler ne administrer au ventre. Et cessent chacun de besongner. Nouvellement imprimé à Paris. Paris, Crapelet pour Silvestre. 10 May 1840. Rare book.

"Son crie dans vins claretz vermeils ou blans
A dix deniers deux sols ou quatre blancz
Escouter fault lequel est le meilleur"

- Le Testament de Carmentrant à VIII personnaiges
- Deux jeux de Carnaval de la fin du Moyen Âge: La Bataille de Sainct Pensard à l'encontre de Caresme et Le Testament de Carmentrant, Librairie Droz, Paris-Genève, 1978
- Les Grans et Merveilleux Faictz du seigneur Nemo, avec les privilleges qu'il a et la puissance qu'il peult avoir depuis le commencement du monde jusques à la fin

== See also ==
- French Renaissance literature
