= Adele Passy-Cornet =

German opera singer

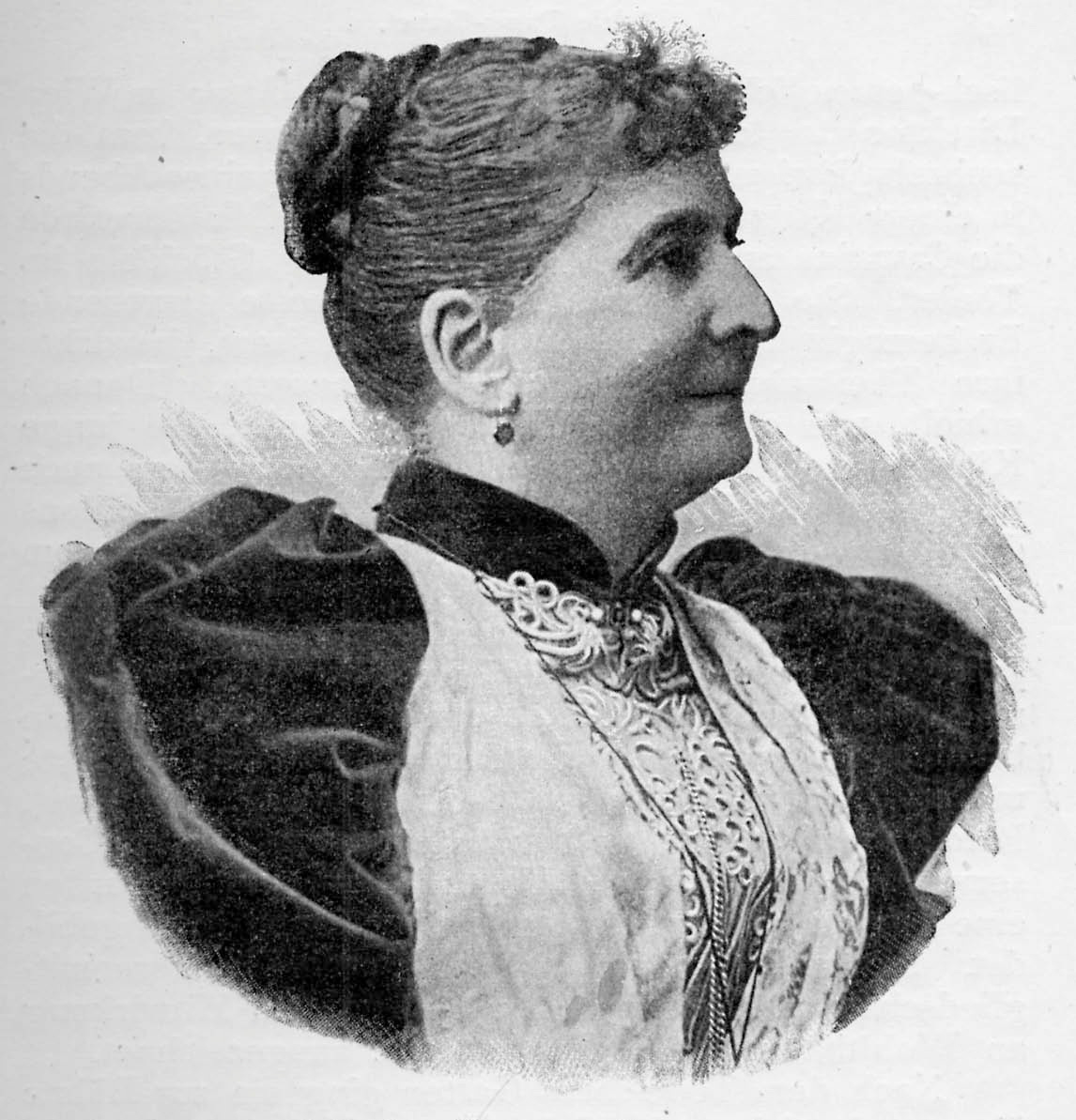
Adele Passy-Cornet

Adele Passy-Cornet (22 January 1838 – 2 November 1915) was a German opera soprano singer.

== Life ==
Born in Braunschweig, Passy-Cornet was a daughter of the opera singer couple Julius and Franziska Cornet. After she received her first artistic lessons by her mother, Passy-Cornet went to Hamburg and took singing lessons there. Afterwards she sang in Austria and appeared among other things at concerts at the Viennese court.

She later performed as a coloratura also in her homeland, among other places in Braunschweig, Hamburg and Hannover. At the age of 27, Passy-Cornet got an engagement at the Theater am Kärntnertor in Vienna in 1865 and made her debut there with outstanding success as the "Queen of the Night". Although she achieved great success in a short time and could choose her engagements, she soon devoted herself only to singing occasional concerts. She married, and her daughter was the singer Anna Prasch-Passy.

Passy-Cornet founded a private singing school in Vienna and directed it until 1881, before being appointed singing teacher at the Franz Liszt Academy of Music in Budapest. In 1892 she gave up this office and returned to Germany. She settled in Nuremberg and taught singing there.

== Selected roles ==
- Queen of the night – The Magic Flute
- Isabelle – Robert le diable
- Rosina – Il barbiere di Siviglia

== Some of her pupils ==
- Caroline Charles-Hirsch, Anna Jäger, Julie Kopacsy-Karczag

== Bibliography ==
- Passy-Cornet, Adele
- A. Ehrlich (editor): Berühmte Sängerinnen der Vergangenheit und Gegenwart. Eine Sammlung von 91 Biographien und 90 Porträts. Leipzig 1895
- Ludwig Eisenberg: Adele Passy-Cornet. In Großes biographisches Lexikon der deutschen Bühne im XIX. Jahrhundert. Paul List, Leipzig 1903, p. 750
- Passy-Cornet, Adele. In Karl-Josef Kutsch, Leo Riemens: Großes Sängerlexikon. 3rd edition. 1997–2000, volume 4, p. 2666.
