= Die Göttin der Vernunft =

1897 operetta by Johann Strauss II

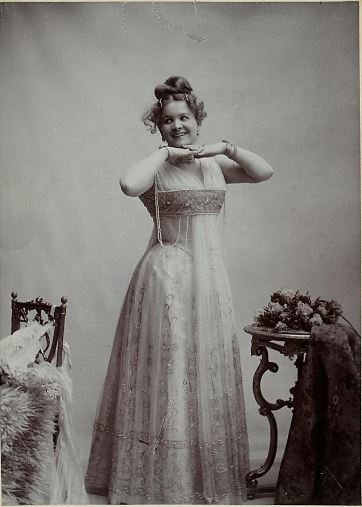
Julie Kopacsy-Karczag as Ernestine in Die Göttin der Vernunft

Die Göttin der Vernunft (The Goddess of Reason) was the last completed operetta of Johann Strauss II. It was written to a libretto by A. M. Willner and Bernhard Buchbinder and was first performed at the Theater an der Wien on 13 March 1897.

== History ==
The creation of the opera was announced in a Vienna newspaper in July 1896, which reported that Strauss had commenced work on the opera with Willner and Buchbinder, intending to produce it in the autumn of 1897. However, as the composer gradually received the text of the libretto over the ensuing months, he began to dislike the scenario, which made light of the violence of the French Revolution. He tried to discontinue his work, but this would have made him liable to an action for breach of contract from the librettists, and he therefore reluctantly carried on, with Willner writing to him "On the day after the première, you will see how wrong you have been." Strauss did not attend the première, claiming a bronchial infection—the only one of his works where he was not present on the opening night—and he was informed of the work's reception during the evening by telephone. However, Strauss's admirer Johannes Brahms was in the audience, his last public appearance before his death in April. The reception of the work by audience and press was not unfavourable, although one newspaper asked "can one disguise a blood-red guillotine with flowers?" During the run of 36 performances, a number of cuts were made, Strauss providing an overture only by the 25th performance.

The opera was subsequently never revived in its original form. In 1909, ten years after the composer's death, the music was adapted to an entirely new libretto and presented as Reiche Mädchen (Rich Girls). The music and libretto had by now been separated by legal process, so Willner reworked the story-line of the libretto as Der Graf von Luxemburg (The Count of Luxembourg) for Franz Lehár.

The conductor Christian Pollack recreated Strauss's original version from manuscripts in the Austrian National Library and in 2009 staged the first revival of the opera since its première in Žilina, Slovakia.

== Roles ==
| Role | Voice type | Premiere cast, 13 March 1897 (Conductor: Adolf Müller junior) |
|---|---|---|
| Comtesse Mathilde de Nevers | soprano | Annie Dirkens |
| Colonel Furieux | tenor | Josef Josephi |
| Captain Robert | tenor | Karl Streitmann |
| Bonhomme, a landowner | tenor | Karl Blasel |
| Ernestine, a folk singer | soprano | Julie Kopacsy-Karczag |
| Jacquelin, a caricaturist | tenor | Werner |
| Susette, the Comtesse's chambermaid | soprano | Theresa Biedermann |
| Sergeant Pandore | baritone | Luzer |
| Chalais, a Jacobin | tenor | Pohl |
| Balais, a Jacobin | baritone | Wallner |
| Calais, a Jacobin | baritone | Kaufmann |
Chorus: Soldiers, citizens, students

== Synopsis ==
The opera takes place in the town of Châlons in 1794, during the Reign of Terror of the French Revolution. It is centred on the plans of Robespierre to replace Christianity with a state religion worshipping the Goddess of Reason. These plans involved public displays of the "Goddess" that were organised by activists such as Pierre Gaspard Chaumette, who stage managed a partly unclothed Goddess entering in procession to Notre-Dame de Paris cathedral and arranged similar proceedings across the country.

=== Act I ===
The Army HQ at Châlons.

Jacquelin attempts to arrange passports for himself and Ernestine from the pompous Colonel Furieux, so that they can flee to Germany. He is being pursued by three Jacobins because of his political cartoons. Furieux demands to see Ernestine and threatens Jacquelin with execution if he cannot provide her; Jacquelin says she is detained in Paris to take the part of the Goddess of Reason. The landowner Bonhomme saw her in Paris in this role and was forced by the crowd to enter a mock-marriage with her: having escaped back to Châlons, he hopes he has escaped her.

Enter the countess who also desires to escape; Furieux is on the lookout for her. Bonhomme and Jacquelin persuade her to pretend to be Ernestine so that they can both escape. Furieux invites 'Ernestine' to dine with the officers, where they try to persuade her to don the Goddess's revealing costume. 'Ernestine' chooses Captain Robert as her protector, to the annoyance of Furieux.

The real Ernestine arrives with a warrant from the National Convention giving her the power to appoint a delegate from Châlons. She names Bonhomme for the role. Confronted with the countess, Ernestine declares that she is not the true Goddess of Reason, but Bonhomme, with his new authority, overrules her.

=== Act II ===
The gardens of the Convent School.

Ernestine and the countess quarrel over Bonhomme. Robert and Furieux get involved, the former defending the countess from Furieux's advances. By accident Furieux discovers that Jacquelin is the sought-after caricaturist and that the 'Goddess' is an aristocrat, and he accuses Robert (who in reality is a marquis) of treason. Bonhomme takes the initiative of taking the countess and Jacquelin under his protection to his country estate and threatens to arrest Furieux if he attempts to intervene. Ernestine distracts everyone by donning the costume of the Goddess and dancing on the table.

=== Act III ===
Bonhomme's country estate.

Ernestine and Jacquelin have obtained their passports, but Ernestine gives them to the countess and Robert. The latter marry, as do Ernestine and Jacquelin and Bonhomme and Susette (the countess's maid).
