= Oscar Potoker =

Russian composer

- Born: April 26, 1880; Vinnytsia, Russia
- Died: 26 June 1935 (aged 55); Los Angeles
- Occupation: musician
- Known for: movie music

Oscar Potoker (born Vinnytsia April 26, 1880, death 26 Jun 1935 – Los Angeles, age 55) was a musician and film composer.

== Early life ==
In Russia, Potoker composed chamber works based on Jewish folk music. Potoker immigrated from Russia to Paris, France, where he lived, and then from Cherbourg to the US, March 5, 1924, aboard the Berengaria.

== Movies and teaching ==
Potoker composed movie scores from 1929 to 1935, among them Blonde Venus (1932) with Marlene Dietrich, The Mysterious Dr. Fu Manchu (1929), The Vagabond King (1930), Trailing the Killer (1932), and Hei Tiki (1935). He also trained piano students in theory and harmony.

== Automobile accident ==
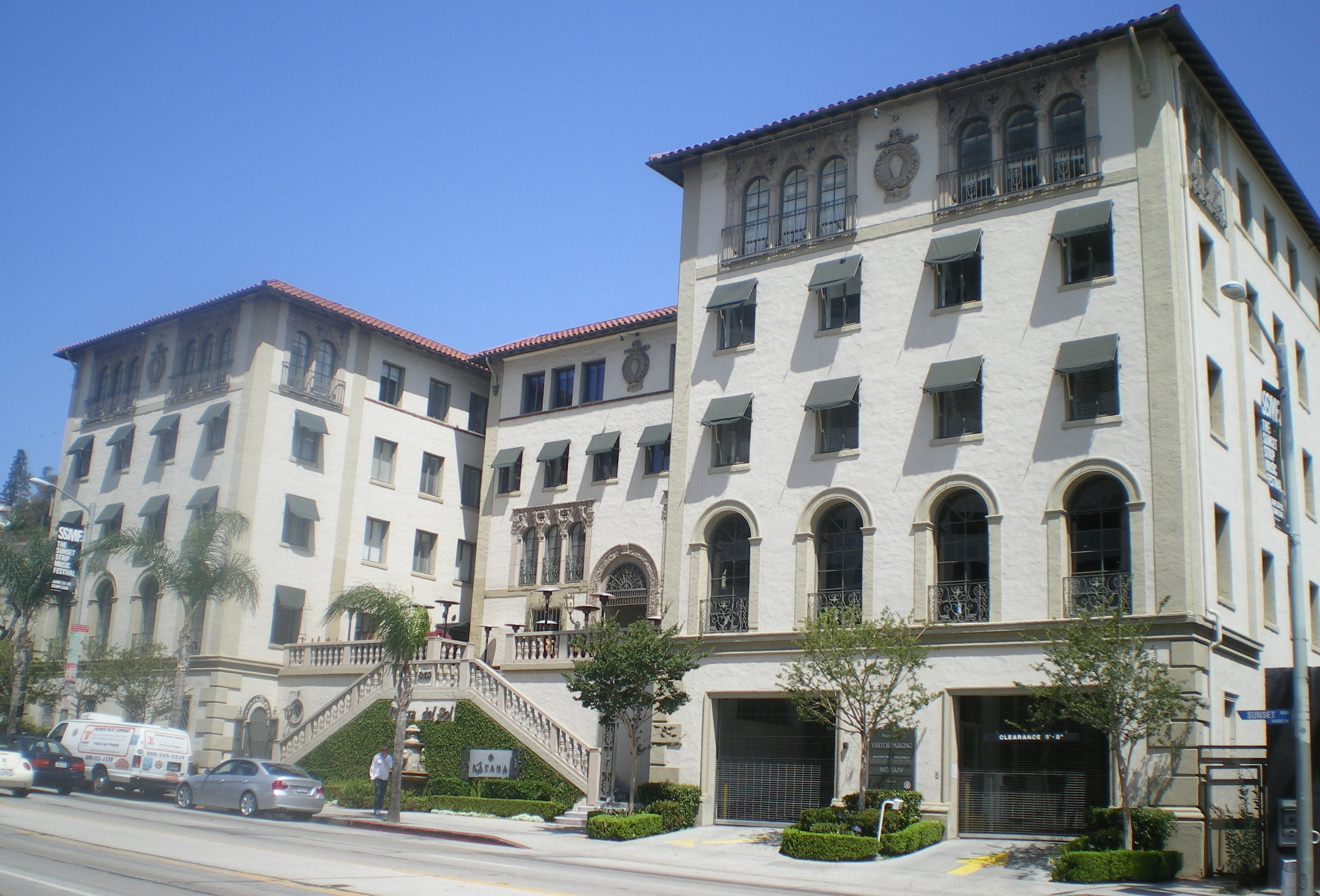
Hacienda Arms (Piazza del Sol), West Hollywood, home of Josiah Zuro and Oscar Potoker in 1930

Potoker was riding in an automobile film composer Josiah Zuro was driving, October 18, 1930, when the car overturned on Torrey Pines Road, north of San Diego. Zuro, age 42, died in an ambulance on his way to Scripps Memorial Hospital in La Jolla. Potoker was hospitalized seriously injured but recovered. Zuro and Potoker had both lived in the same building, 8439 Sunset Blvd, Hacienda Arms Apartments, according to the 1930 US census.
