= Cornett, Herefordshire =

Hamlet in Herefordshire, England

Coordinates: 52.14392°N 2.62686°W

Cornett is a hamlet in the English county of Herefordshire.

It lies on the main A417 road southeast of the town of Leominster.
