= Julius Cornet =

Austrian operatic tenor and opera director

Julius Cornet (15 June 1793 – 2 October 1860) was an Austrian operatic tenor and opera director. He was engaged at opera houses in Vienna, Braunschweig, Hamburg and Berlin.

== Life ==
Cornet was born in St Kanzian in Carinthia in 1793, the youngest of eleven children; his father was a forester and mine manager. As a child he received music lessons at Wilten Abbey near Innsbruck, and he was noted for his beautiful voice. He studied law in Graz and Vienna, but later discontinued legal studies. In 1816 he took part in a gala performance of the oratorio The Liberation of Jerusalem by Maximilian Stadler, in which he replaced the indisposed intended tenor soloist. The director of the performance, Antonio Salieri, afterwards offered him singing lessons.

He appeared in Vienna at the Theater am Kärntnertor in 1817. From 1818 he appeared in Graz, and in 1820 he was engaged for five years at the court theatre of Braunschweig, under the direction of August Klingemann.

He married in 1825 Franziska Kiel, a soprano singer at the theatre. A few months later they went to Hamburg and appeared there in the state theatre, returning to Braunschweig in 1832, where Julius Cornet was lead tenor and director of the theatre for four years, and Franziska was a coloratura soprano.

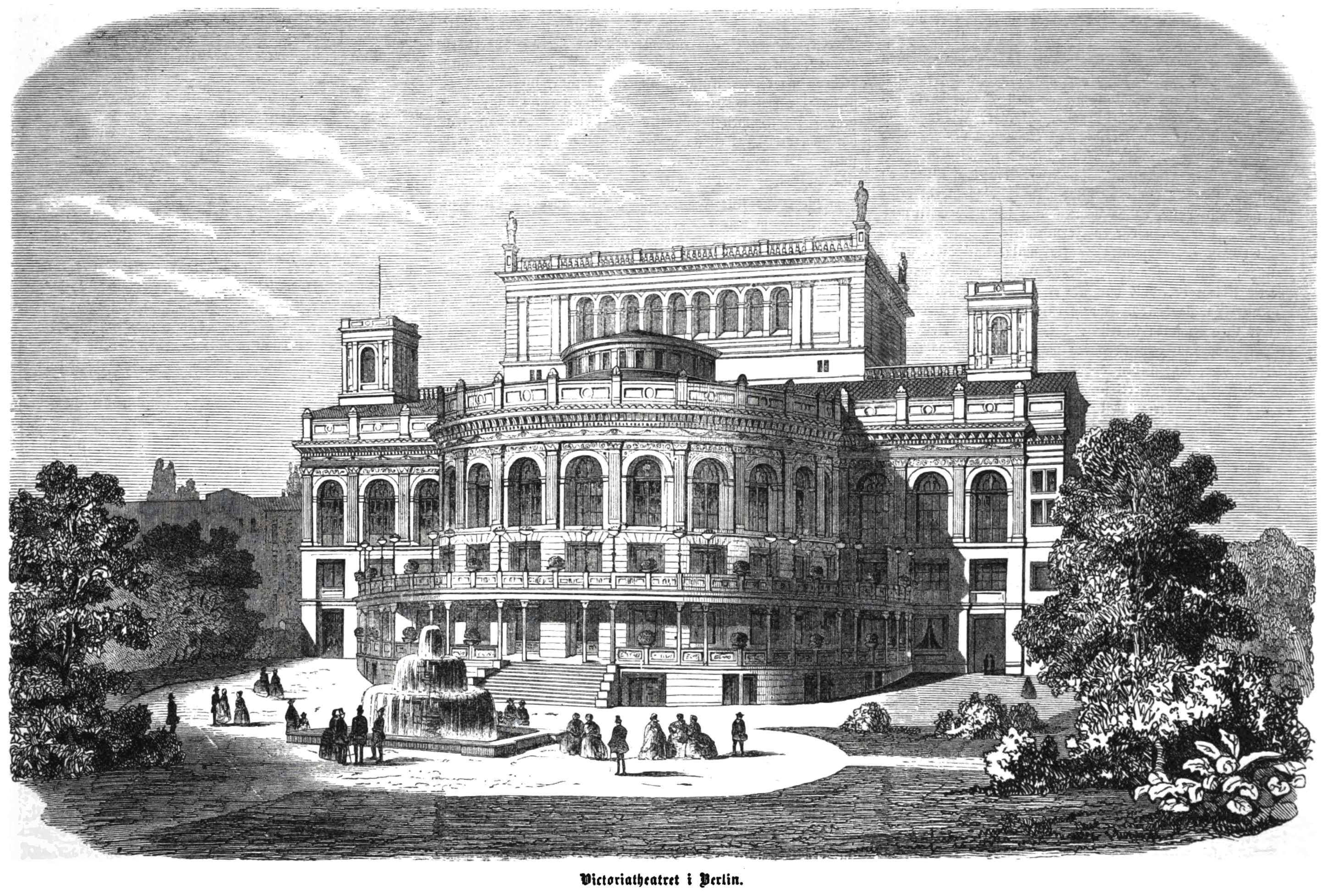
Victoria Theatre, Berlin, opened in 1859, demolished in 1891

He made guest appearances in several cities in Germany. He was in Paris in 1829, where he studied the part of Masaniello in Daniel Auber's opera La muette de Portici, and performed the role to critical success. He became a friend of Adolphe Nourrit, the original Masaniello, and introduced him to songs of Schubert and Beethoven. With the help of August Lewald, Cornet translated the opera into German, and appeared in Germany in the opera.

From 1841 to 1847 he was director of Hamburg State Opera, and in Hamburg he founded with his wife a singing conservatory. From 1853 to 1858 he was director of the Theater am Kärntnertor in Vienna. He moved to Berlin, where he was director of the Victoria Theatre. He died in Berlin in 1860.

Joseph Kürschner, his biographer in Allgemeine Deutsche Biographie, wrote: "With unreserved openness and straightforwardness as a director, energetic in his willingness, he was as excellent as a singer as he was as an actor."

The opera singer Adele Passy-Cornet was a daughter of Julius and Franziska Cornet.
