= Hacienda Arms Apartments =

- U.S. National Register of Historic Places
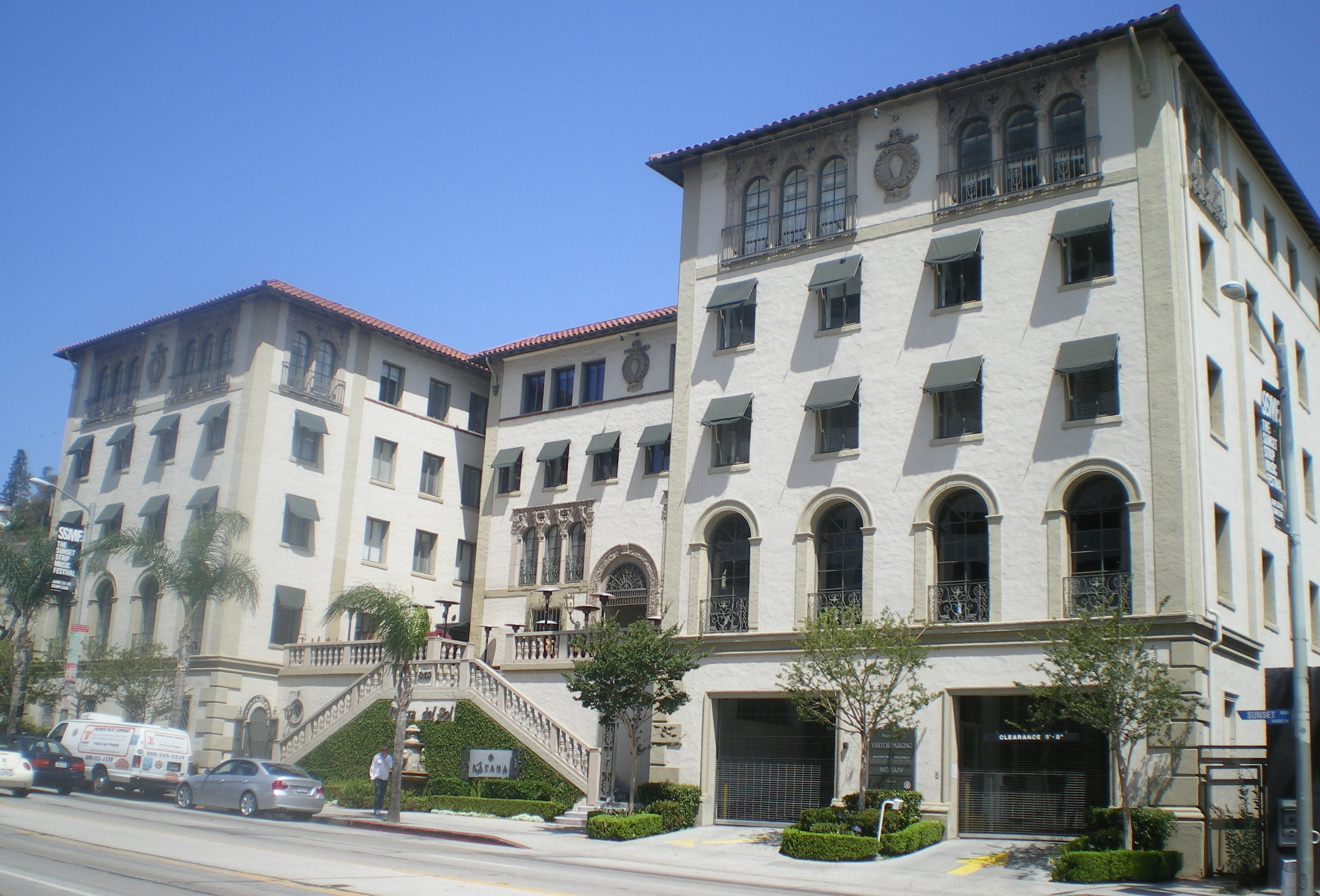
- Piazza del Sol, 2008

- Location within the Los Angeles metropolitan area Location within California Location within the United States
- Location: 8439 Sunset Blvd., West Hollywood, California
- Coordinates: 34°5′42″N 118°22′24″W
- Built: 1927
- Architect: Charles Sherman Cobb; Bard, Arthur, & Co.
- Architectural style: Italian Renaissance Revival-Mediterranean Revival
- NRHP reference No.: 83003531
- Added to NRHP: December 15, 1983

Hacienda Arms Apartments, also known as Coronet Apartments and Piazza del Sol, is a historic building located on the Sunset Strip in West Hollywood, California, United States.

The four-story, 52,000-square-foot (4,800 m^{2}) Italian Renaissance Revival sourced Mediterranean Revival style structure was built in 1927 and operated initially as a luxury apartment building catering to the entertainment business. In the 1930s, it became the "most famous brothel in California." The building declined in prestige in the 1950s and 1960 and was acquired by rock star Rod Stewart in the 1970s. After Stewart's plans to redevelop the building as a luxury hotel ended in a legal dispute, the building was nearly destroyed in a 1983 fire that was found to be of suspicious origin. It was extensively renovated and, since 1986, has been known as the Piazza del Sol. It now houses the offices of several production companies, including Miramax Films. The restaurant Katana, co-owned by Ryan Seacrest and Tori Spelling and described by Newsweek as "so hip it hurts," also operates at the building.

== Historic designation and architecture ==
The building was designed in an Italian Renaissance revival style, described by some as "reminiscent of a classic Italian villa." After the building was nearly destroyed by fire in 1983, the Los Angeles Conservancy led an effort to have the building designated as a historic site. The Conservancy's executive director, Ruthann Lehrer, noted: "The building is a beauty ... You find period revival buildings in a variety of places, but this one is really palatial. It's like a European palace." The application to have the building added to the National Register of Historic Places noted its ornamented cream-and-tan plaster facade, its "grand entrance stairway and fountain, elaborate cast-stone decorations and arched entryway." The building also retains original antique Italian marble and stonework, plaster edifices and wrought iron. The building was added to the National Register in December 1983.

== Hollywood apartment house ==
Built in 1927 for $382,000, the building was originally known as Hacienda Arms Apartments and became the home of wealthy Hollywood families. The Hacienda Arms was the home to motion picture actors, including Marie Dressler, James Dunn, Grant Withers, Loretta Young, Jeanette MacDonald, US child star Leon Janney, and the film composers Josiah Zuro and Oscar Potoker.

== Classiest brothel on the Sunset Strip ==
During the 1930s, the building gained notoriety as the site of the "House of Francis," described as the "most famous brothel in California," and the "classiest brothel on the Sunset Strip" The "House of Francis" was featured in a 2005 book about Hollywood's "fixers," the men who worked to shield Hollywood's Golden Age stars from public scandal. The fixers reportedly had their "hands full" trying to cover for events at the high-class brothel. The establishment was run by famed madam Lee Francis, who wrote the book Ladies on Call. The brothel was staffed largely by young women who had come to Hollywood to become movie stars but ended up as highly paid prostitutes, making as much as $1,000 a week—a fortune in the Depression era.

In his 1981 book, Hidden Hollywood, Hollywood historian Richard Lamparski reported that Francis entertained "married men and movie stars world-famous for their sexual attractiveness." Regular customers at the "House of Francis" included Jean Harlow, who visited the house and paid Francis $500 to take customers home with her. Francis' prostitutes and customers reportedly "complained about Harlow's rough sexual appetite." Clark Gable, Errol Flynn, and Spencer Tracy were also regular customers, and the "fixers" often had to retrieve the ill-tempered Tracy from the establishment. The MGM studio was reported to have maintained a business charge account at the brothel under an assumed name.

Francis reportedly paid 40% of her profits to police and politicians, and occasional vice squad "raids" reportedly resulted in no arrests, as police were greeted with cash, Russian caviar and French champagne. However, in 1940, Francis was arrested in a police raid and convicted of operating a house of ill repute. Upon her arrest, Francis reportedly told the arresting officer, "You are a sly one you are. In 31 years in business, this is the first time anyone ever got me."

== Years of decline ==
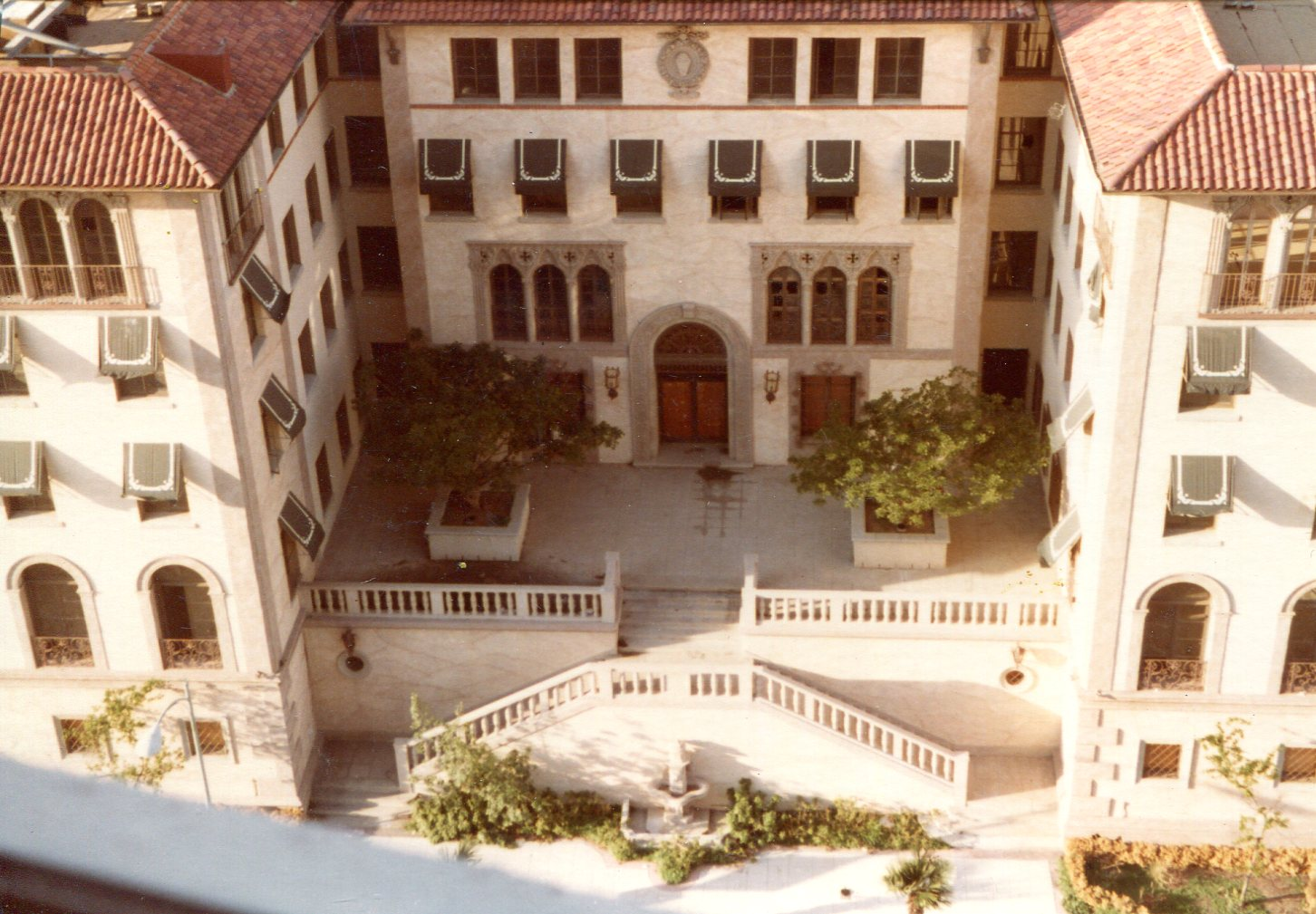
Coronet Building entrance in 1978

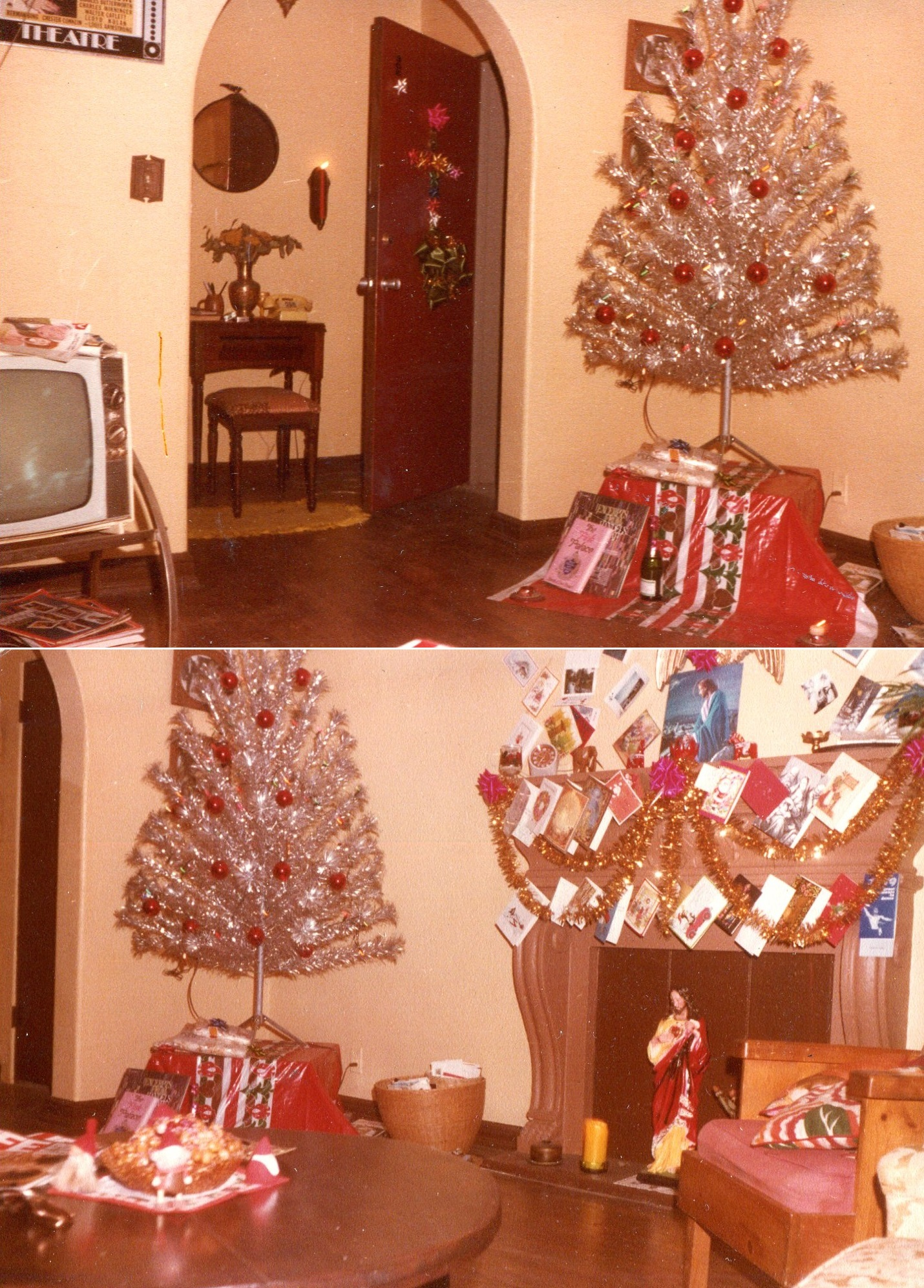
Xmas interiors of an apartment in 1978 before the fire

The famed Ciro's night club opened next door in 1940. At that time the building was known as Coronet Apartments.

From the 1940s through the 1970s, the building changed hands many times and fell into decline. The Los Angeles Times reported in 1983 that the decline of the building "roughly paralleled the decline of Hollywood," and the building had an "unremarkable history" in the 1950s and 1960s. The sales of the building during this period include the following:

- In 1941, the Coronet was acquired by G. E. Kinsey.
- In 1950, the building was sold by K.L.M., Inc., to Lee Herman and Victor S. Herman for a reported price of $275,000.
- In 1952, the building was purchased by Mr. and Mrs. Isidor Tumarkin for $280,000.
- Frank Sennes, who also owned Ciro's, bought the building in 1960.

Sennes noted that, for a time in the 1960s, there were "a lot of hippies" living there. Sennes emptied the building in the late 1970s with plans to renovate it.

== Rod Stewart years ==
Rock star Rod Stewart purchased the building in the late 1970s along with partner Barry Monzio. Stewart invested or borrowed more than $1.6 million (equivalent to $6.3 million in 2025) to convert the blighted and deserted building into a European-style luxury hotel. As the costs escalated, Stewart and Monzio became engaged in a bitter legal dispute, and the renovation work was halted. Monzio sued in 1980, accusing Stewart of trying to squeeze him out. Stewart counterclaimed for dissolution of the partnership, and Stewart became the sole owner of the building after settling the suit with Monzio.

In April 1982, Stewart was robbed at gunpoint upon leaving the building in broad daylight with his three-year-old daughter. The gunman stole Stewart's Porsche Carrera.

In July 1983, the Coronet, which was vacant at the time, was nearly destroyed in a fire. The interior of the building was completely gutted, and the exterior was charred. Investigators believed the fire was set intentionally, because it started in three places, and its rapid spread suggested it had been "boosted" with a flammable liquid. Some reports blamed the fire on "vagrants" living in the building.

== Piazza del Sol ==
Before the 1983 fire, San Francisco-based Westcap Financial Group had agreed to purchase the building for $4.2 million, and Westcap went forward with the acquisition despite the fire. Westcap converted the space into 40,000 square feet (3,700 m^{2}) of luxury office space, and changed the building's name to the Piazza del Sol. In 1986, the West Hollywood Chamber of Commerce honored the remodeled building with an architectural award. The building's leasing agent states that the Piazza del Sol is a "Class A Office Building" offering a full range of office spaces from 300 square feet (28 m^{2}) to full floor, 10,000-square-foot (930 m^{2}) spaces. The Piazza del Sol houses the offices of several movie production companies, including Miramax Films, and The Film Department.

The celebrity-owned restaurant Katana Robata & Sushi Bar is also located within the building. Katana, partly owned by Ryan Seacrest and Tori Spelling, serves "rustic Japanese fare" and sushi in a "sci-fi-inspired decor." Katana was described by Newsweek in 2004 as "so hip it hurts." Newsweek suggested that the visitor to Katana "wear disaffected black and sit among the beautiful people outside on a veranda overlooking the bustle of Sunset Strip."

== See also ==
- National Register of Historic Places listings in Los Angeles County, California
