= Monte Cornetto =

Mountain in Italy

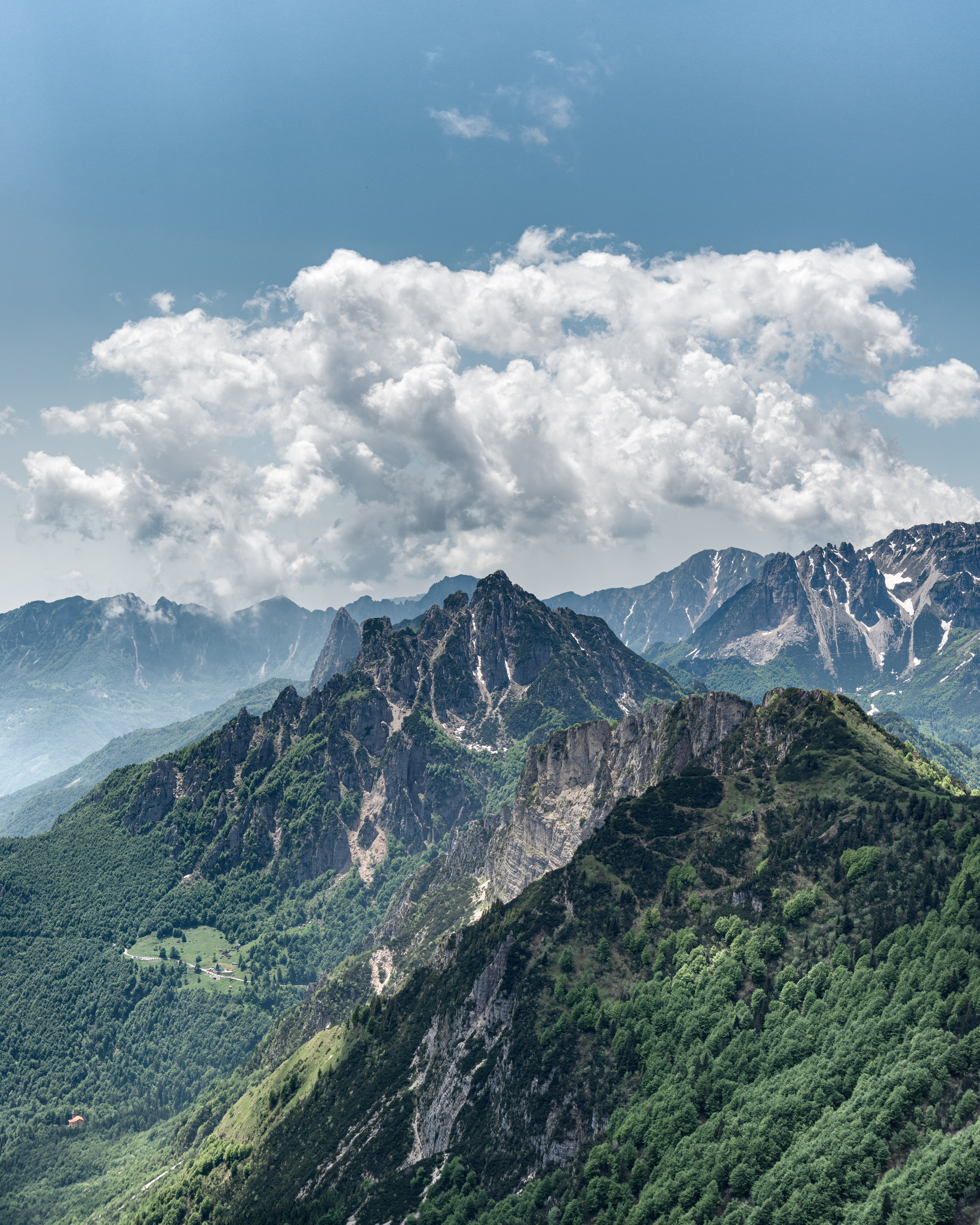

Highest point
- Elevation: 1,899 m (6,230 ft)
- Coordinates: 45°44′49″N 11°10′34″E

Geography
- Location within Italy
- Location: Veneto, Italy

Monte Cornetto is a mountain of the Veneto, Italy. It has an elevation of 1,899 metres (6,230 ft).
