= Cristina Cornejo (politician) =

Salvadoran deputy

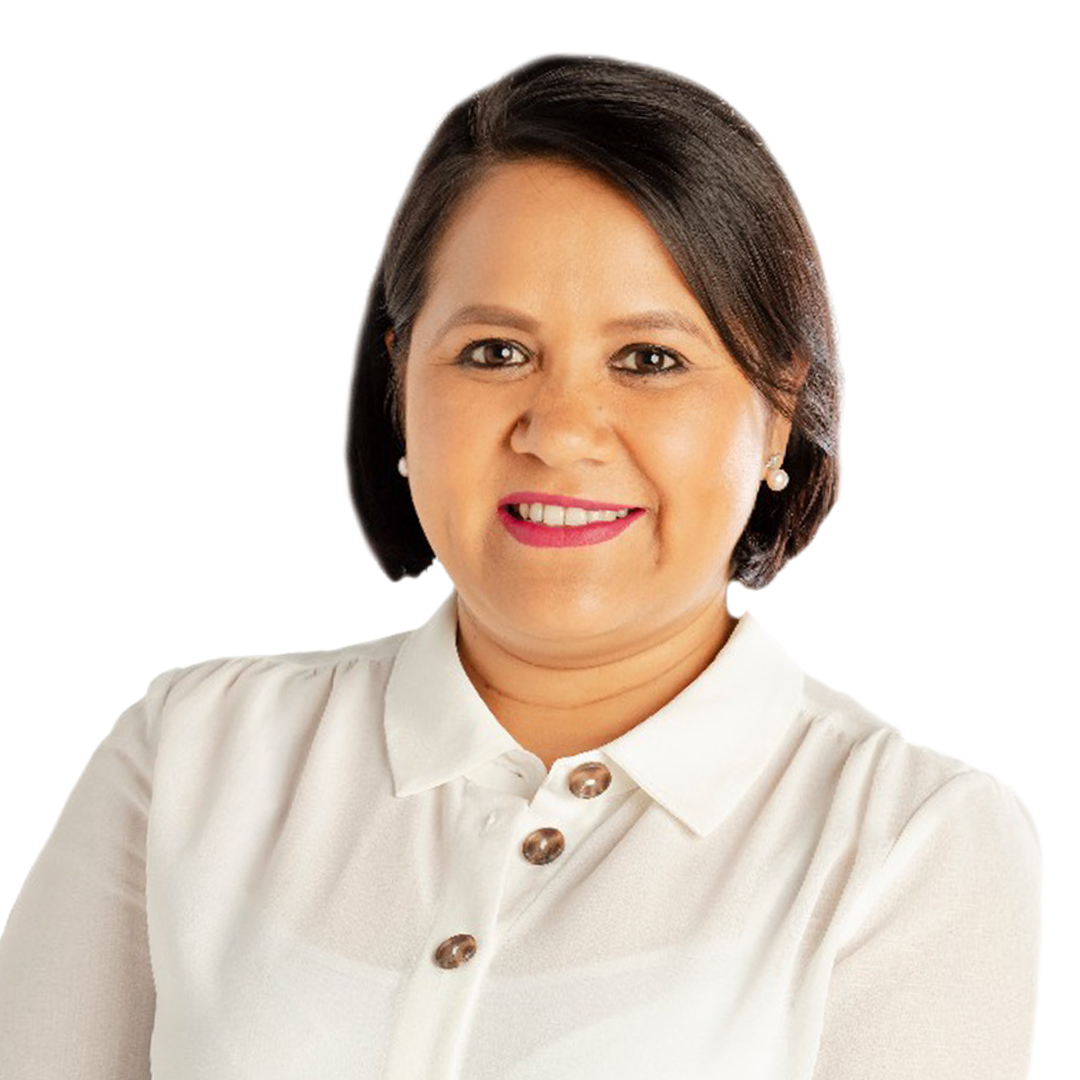
- Cristina Cornejo

Deputy of the Legislative Assembly of El Salvador from La Libertad
- In office 1 May 2015 – 1 May 2021

Personal details
- Born: Norma Cristina Cornejo Amaya; 10 October 1982 (age 43) Cojutepeque, El Salvador
- Party: FMLN
- Parents: Manuel de Jesús Cornejo (father); Irma Amaya (mother)
- Education: Francisco Gavidia University
- Occupation: Lawyer, politician
- Website: cristinacornejo.org

Norma Cristina Cornejo Amaya (born 10 October 1982) is a Salvadoran lawyer, feminist, and politician of the Farabundo Martí National Liberation Front (FMLN).

== Biography ==
Cristina Cornejo was born on 10 October 1982, the second of three daughters of Manuel de Jesús Cornejo, former FMLN special forces commander with the nom de guerre "Felipito", and Irma Amaya, feminist and first Salvadoran woman president of the Central American Parliament.

She studied at the Santa Isabel school in Cojutepeque until the age of 15. She then moved to Santa Tecla, where she finished her baccalaureate.

In 2001, she entered Francisco Gavidia University, earning a licentiate in legal science at age 23. In 2006, she was authorized as a lawyer by the Supreme Court of El Salvador. She has made additional studies in politics and government, gender, leadership, and procedural oral techniques.

In 2007, she became a founding member of the Santa Tecla Fútbol Club, an institution that came about at the initiative of former Santa Tecla mayor Oscar Ortiz and local entrepreneurs.

== Political career ==
At age 15, Cornejo became a youth leader in La Libertad Department, and in 2009, at 25, she was elected for the first time as an alternate deputy of the Legislative Assembly for the FMLN. She served two consecutive terms, from 2009 to 2012 and from 2012 to 2015.

She is co-author of the book El país que viene: Una generación comprometida (The Country to Come: A Committed Generation), with the proposals of 40 young leaders from El Salvador. She has shared her experience with other young Salvadorans abroad, in the United States and Canada.

In 2015, she was elected as proprietary deputy for La Libertad Department. During her three-year term, she was a member of the Youth and Sports Commission and the Legislation and Constitutional Points Commission. In the same period, she was a founder of the Young People's Parliamentary Group, the first of its kind in Latin America, and was elected as its first president.

In 2018, she was elected as a deputy of the Legislative Assembly for La Libertad Department. She was also appointed third secretary of its board of directors.

After being elected, Cornejo was a vocal proponent of renouncing the benefits of the Assembly, such as bonds, private medical insurance, luxury vans, and other assignments, as an example of austerity and diligence in legislative work. As a result, members of the board from other political parties were also induced to give up these benefits.

As a deputy, she is on the Legislation and Constitutional Points committee, the Electoral and Constitutional Reforms committee, and the ad hoc commission to study the draft Law on Administrative Simplification and Creation of the Regulatory Improvement Body. She is also part of the leadership of the FMLN's legislative section.

In May 2018, she was elected Vice President for Central America of the Parliamentary Network for Gender Equality. She was also a member of the ParlAmericas Council, a representative body of 22 countries of the Americas and the Caribbean, from 2018 to 2020.

Cornejo is an active member of the Mélida Anaya Montes Women's Movement Association.
