= Claude-Melchior Cornette =

French chemist, physician and apothecary

Claude-Melchior Cornette (1 March 1744 – 11 May 1794) was a French chemist, physician and apothecary who worked under royal patronage just before the French Revolution drove him into exile. He conducted experimental studies on chemical reactions.

== Life ==
Cornette was born in Besançon to Pierre-Claude Cornette and Claude-Antoine Sauvin. He was educated at a local Jesuit college before going to apprentice under apothecary Janson. In 1763 he went to Paris to study chemistry under Pierre Macquer and Antoine Baumé. He also studied pharmacy with Guillaume-François Rouelle. Around 1772 he began to work in the marly-le-Roi laboratory of the royal physician Joseph-Marie-François de Lassone. He also studied and became a physician in 1778 and also became a member of the Academy of Sciences. In 1788, on the death of Lassone, he became royal physician. Sophie (1734–82), the daughter of Louis XV, was interested in scientific objects and had Cornette organize a scientific cabinet for her. The French Revolution forced him into exile and he died in 1794 in Rome.

== Contributions to chemistry ==
Cornette conducted studies on reactions between acids, salts and oils. He examined reversible reactions, following the work of Baumé, and noted that potassium sulphate could be broken by hydrochloric acid. He also noted that the concentrations of materials could alter reaction directions and rates in 1788. He published Mémoire sur la formation du salpêtre (1799).

=== Publications ===
- Mémoire sur la décomposition de plusieurs sels neutres à base d'alkalis fixes et volatils, par l'acide marin, Académie royale des sciences, 1778, p. 44-60
- mémoire sur l'action comparée de l'acide nitreux et de l'acide marin sur les sels virrioliques à base terreuse, Académie royale des sciences, 1778, p. 333-346
- Observation sur un acide glacial, obtenu par la distillation d'un mélange d'acide nitreux fumant et de charbon embrasé et réduit en poudre, Académie des sciences, 1779, p. 479-485
- Observation sur le vitriol de mercure, Académie royale des sciences, 1779, p. 485-486
- Mémoire sur la décomposition, par l'acide marin, de plusieurs sels vitrioliques et nitreux à base métallique, Académie royale des sciences, 1779, p. 487-496
- Observation sur les différents sels que l'on retire par la lixiviation des cendres du tamaris, pris en différents lieux, Académie royale des sciences, 1779, p. 497-501
- With Lassone, Mémoire sur une inflammation spontanée du phospore, avec quelques remarques sur la nature de son acide, Académie royale des sciences, 1780, p. 508-514
- Mémoire sur l'action de l'acide vitriolique sur les huiles, Académie royale des sciences, 1780, p. 542-557
- Mémoire sur l'action de l'acide marin sur les huiles, Académie royale des sciences, 1780, p. 558-567
- Mémoire sur les altérations que les huiles essentielles et les huiles grasses éprouvent par l'action de l'acide nitreux, Académie royale des sciences, 1780, p. 567-582
- Avec Lassone, Mémoire sur un phénomène singulier que présentent les acides minéraux, pendant leur concentration; et sur un nouveau moyen de se procurer facilement de l'eau-forte des plus pures, Académie royale des sciences, 1781, p. 645-656
- Mémoire sur l'action de l'acide phosphorique sur les huiles; et sur la combinaison de cet acde avec l'esprit-de-vin, Académie royale des sciences, 1782, p. 219-226
- Mémoire sur le sel ammoniacal vitriolique, ou sel secret de Glauber, Académie royale des sciences, 1783, p. 731-744
- Mémoire sur le sel ammoniacal nitreux, Académie royale des sciences, 1783, p. 745-759
- Mémoire sur la décomposition du sel ammoniac, Académie royale des sciences, 1786, p. 532-539
- Mémoire sur le mercure doux, Académie royale des sciences, 1786, p. 540-545
- With Lassone, Mémoire sur la nature de la substance saline acide que l'on retire de la cerise, de la groseille, etc., Académie royale des sciences, 1786, p. 606-612
- Mémoire sur la fermention du salpêtre, en 1779
- Quaestio chemico-medica de diversis saponum generibus
