= Coronet Camera Company =

Defunct camera company in Birmingham, England

- Industry: Photography
- Founded: 1926
- Founder: F.W. Pettifer
- Defunct: 1967
- Fate: Defunct
- Headquarters: Birmingham, England
- Products: Cameras

The Coronet Camera Company was an English company most noted for its box cameras manufactured in the 1950s. The company was established in 1926 at 48 Great Hampton Street, Aston, Birmingham, by Frederick Pettifer.

== Products ==
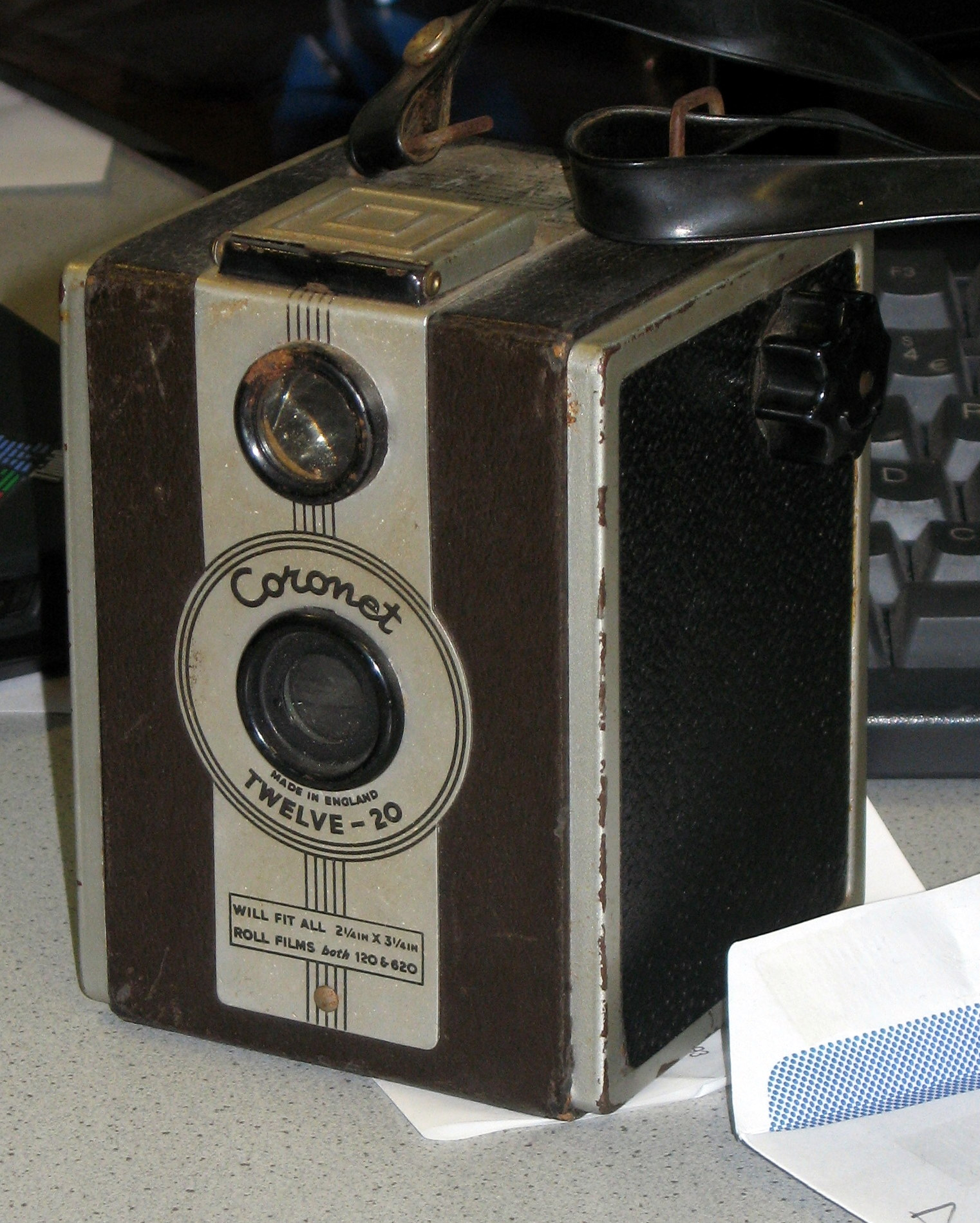
A Coronet Twelve-20 box camera

Products include:

- The Coronet Ambassador - a box camera taking 6x9cm format pictures on 120 film.
- The Coronet Flashmaster - a conventional 120 film camera with flash synchronization, taking 6x6cm format pictures.
- The Coronet Cadet - a similar camera to the Flashmaster, without flash synchronization.
- The Coronet Clipper - a folding camera.
- The Coronet Rapide - a folding camera.
- The Coronet Rex - a box camera taking 6x9cm format pictures on 120 film.
- The Coronet Twelve-20 - a box camera taking 6x6 cm format pictures on 120 film and 620 film. There were two models, the basic and the Colour Filter Model - which had a green filter. Two aperture settings, f/16 and f/22; focus from 7' 0" to ∞ at f/22, or 8’ 6″ to ∞ at f/16; two shutter speeds, either around 1/25 s – 1/50 s (closer to 1/50), or bulb.
- The Coronet Midget

In the main, Coronet. produced budget cameras. They remain common and can be cheaply obtained on the second hand market.

== Company history ==
The Coronet Camera Company was founded in Birmingham, England, by F.W. Pettifer, in about 1926. In 1946, the company became Coronet Ltd. The company continued to produce cameras until 1967.
