= Cornedo =

Cornedo can refer to:

- Cornedo all'Isarco, Italian name for Karneid, a municipality in South Tyrol, Italy
- Cornedo Vicentino, a municipality in the province of Vicenza, Italy
