= Matthieu Cornette =

French chess grandmaster (born 1985)

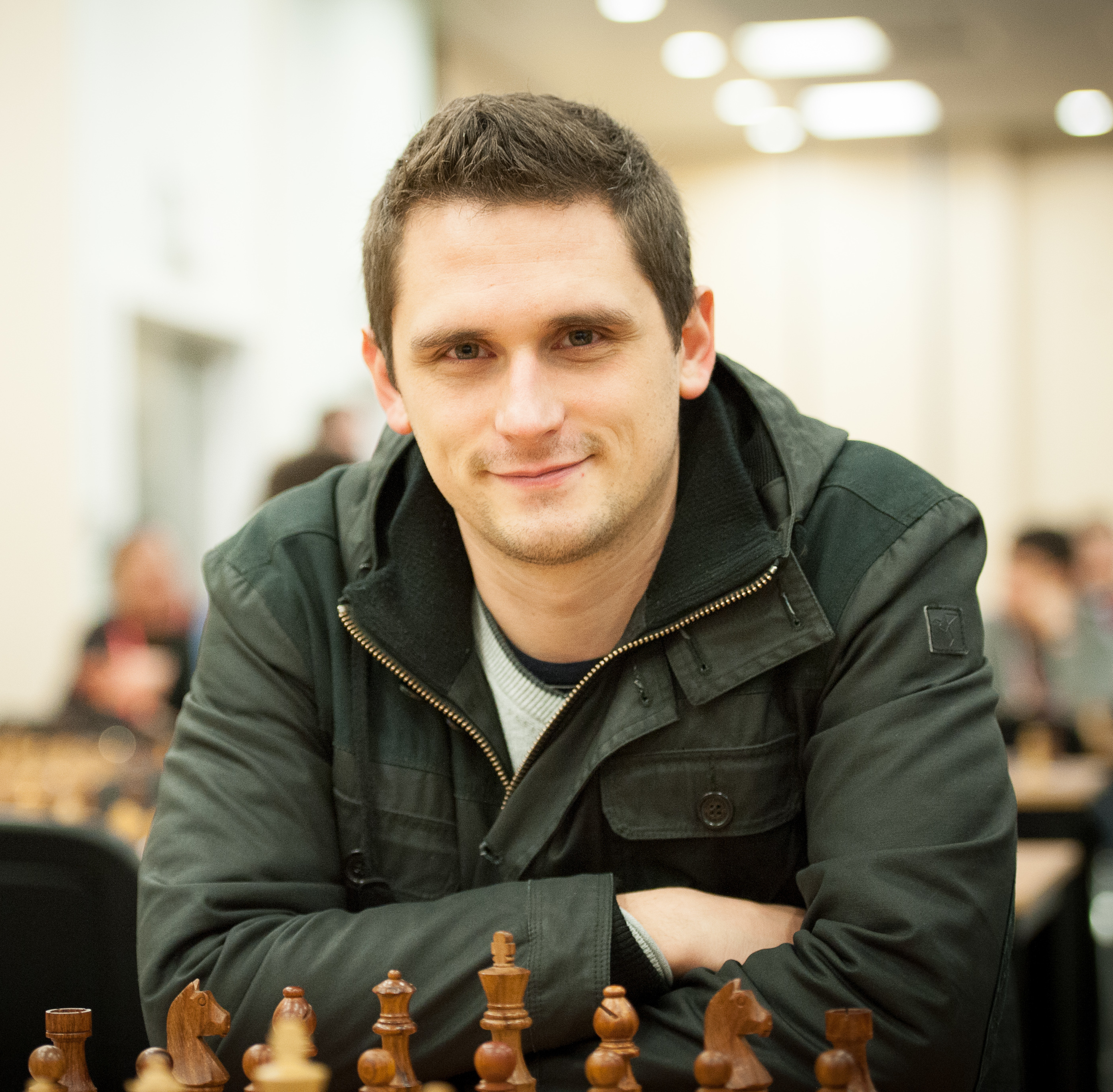
- Cornette in 2016

Personal information
- Born: 4 September 1985 (age 40) Bègles, France
- Spouse: Deimantė Daulytė (m. 2016)

Chess career
- Country: France
- Title: Grandmaster (2008)
- FIDE rating: 2544 (July 2026)
- Peak rating: 2620 (March 2018)

Matthieu Cornette (born 4 September 1985) is a French chess player. He was awarded the title of Grandmaster by FIDE in 2008. He won the French Chess Championship in 2016.

== Chess career ==
Cornette was born in Bègles on 4 September 1985. He learned to play chess at school at the age of 11. He made quick progress and won the French U18 and U20 Championships. At age 18, he decided to become a professional chess player. Beginning in 2008, he received coaching from Josif Dorfman. Cornette earned his grandmaster title in 2008. In 2009, he represented France at the 17th European Team Chess Championship. Playing on the fourth board, he scored 2/6 (+1–3=2). He won the French Chess Championship in 2016, held in Agen. In 2019, he won the 27th Saint-Affrique Open, with a score of 8/9. He had previously placed second in the tournament in 2016, and tied for first in 2018. Cornette also works as a chess coach.

== Personal life ==
Cornette married Lithuanian chess player Deimantė Cornette (née Daulytė) in September 2016.
