= La Cornette (farce) =

French farce by Jehan d'Abundance

La Cornette (French pronunciation: [la kɔʁnɛt]) is a farce published by Jehan d'Abundance in 1544. Its subtitle is Farce nouvelle/tres bonne et tres joyeuse / de la cornette / a v. Personnages / par jehan d’abundance.

== Plot ==
The young wife of an old husband has relationships with a canon and a young man. She fulfills the latter's every expectation thanks to the generosity of the canon. The two nephews of the old husband are afraid of not inheriting. They denounce her. But the valet Finet informs his mistress of this denunciation. The unfaithful wife succeeds in chasing her two enemies away.

== See also ==
- French Renaissance literature

== Bibliography ==
- Fournier, Édouard (éd.). 1872, « La Farce de la cornette », dans Le Théâtre français avant la Renaissance (1450-1550), Paris, La Place, Sanchez, (p. 439-45).
- Rousse, Michel. 1980, « Jean d’Abondance et la farce de la Cornette », dans Yves Guiraud (dir.), La Vie théâtrale dans les provinces du Midi, Tübingen-Paris, Gunter Narr-J.-M. Place, (p. 51-61).
