= Manuela Cornejo Sanchez =

Argentine composer and teacher

Manuela Cornejo Sanchez (1854–1902) was an Argentine composer and teacher.

Sanchez was born in Salta. Little is known about her education. She taught music at Normal School No. 1 (Escuela Normal) in Salta. Her songs were published by the Comison Nacional de Cultura, and included:

- “A Mi Patria”
- “Canto a Guemes”
- “Canto Patriotico”
- “El Sol de Julio”
- “El Sol de Majo”
- “La Escuela (text by Horacio F. Rodriguez)”
- “Himno a Colon”
- “Himno a Rivadavia”
- “Larmes du Coeur”
