= Cornetto =

Cornetto may refer to:

- Cornett, a musical wind instrument, often called cornetto to distinguish it from the cornet
- Cornetto (frozen dessert), a branded frozen ice cream cone
  - Three Flavours Cornetto trilogy, a British film series named after the ice cream
- Cornetto (pastry), an Italian pastry
- Cornetto, Città di Castello, a frazione of Città di Castello, Italy
- Cornicello, another word for cornetto – a good luck charm in the shape of a small horn
- Monte Cornetto, a mountain in Italy
