= Luciano Cornejo Barrera =

Mexican politician (born 1959)

- Born: 26 October 1959 (age 66); Tezontepec de Aldama, Hidalgo, Mexico
- Occupation: Politician
- Political party: PRD

Luciano Cornejo Barrera (born 26 October 1959) is a Mexican politician from the Party of the Democratic Revolution. From 2011 to 2012 he served as Deputy of the LXI Legislature of the Mexican Congress representing the State of Mexico, after having previously served in the Congress of Hidalgo.
