= Guillermo Cornejo =

Peruvian sports shooter (1919–1990)

Personal information
- Born: 25 June 1919 Arequipa, Peru
- Died: 25 November 1990 (aged 71)

Sport
- Sport: Sports shooting

Guillermo Cornejo (25 June 1919 – 25 November 1990) was a Peruvian sports shooter. He competed at the 1956, 1960 and 1964 Summer Olympics.
