= Coronel Cornejo =

Coordinates: 22°44′S 63°50′W

- Municipality and town
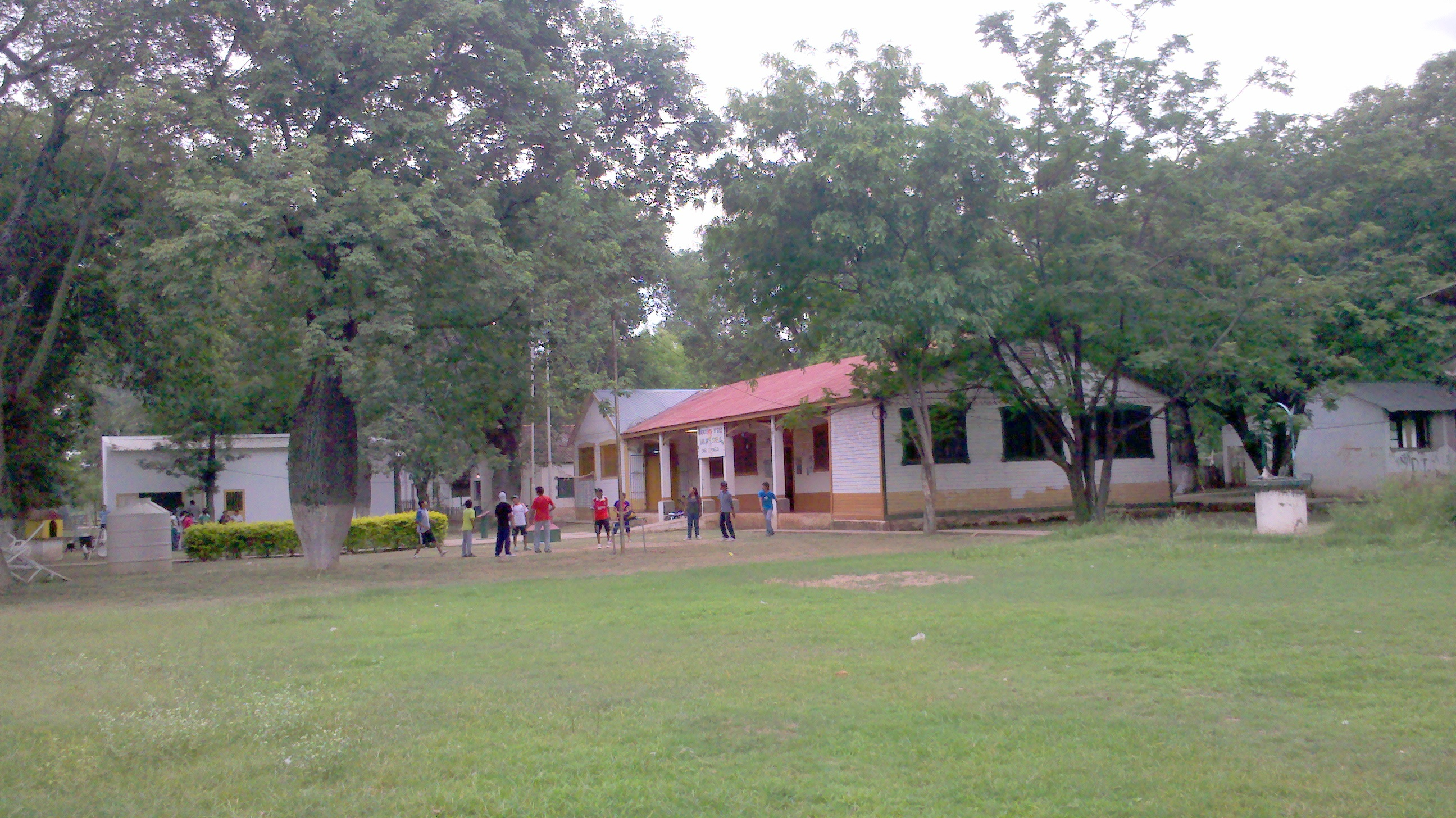
- 'Juan Angel Strella' school in Coronel Cornejo
- Interactive map of Coronel Cornejo
- Country: Argentina
- Province: Salta Province
- Elevation: 1,398 ft (426 m)

Population (2001)
  - Total: 2,267
- Time zone: UTC−3 (ART)

Coronel Cornejo is a town and municipality in Salta Province in northwestern Argentina.
