= Jordi Cornet =

Spanish politician (1965–2021)

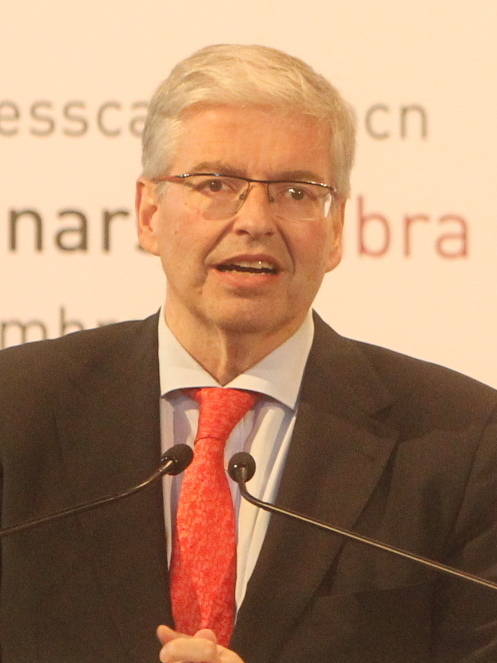
- Cornet in 2017

Member of the Parliament of Catalonia
- In office 16 December 2010 – 17 January 2012

First Secretary of the Parliament of Catalonia
- In office 16 December 2010 – 17 January 2012
- Preceded by: Lídia Santos
- Succeeded by: Pere Calbó

City Councillor of Barcelona
- In office 1995–2010

Personal details
- Born: Jordi Cornet i Serra; 29 December 1965 Barcelona, Spain
- Died: 19 March 2021 (aged 55)
- Party: PP; PPC

Jordi Cornet (29 December 1965 – 19 March 2021) was a Spanish politician and businessman.

== Biography ==
Cornet held a degree in business sciences from the University of Barcelona. In 1986, he became a member of the People's Party, which he represented while serving on the City Council of Barcelona from 1995 to 2010. He then served in the Parliament of Catalonia from 2010 to 2012, during which he served as First Secretary. In January 2012, he resigned from Parliament and became President of the Executive Committee of the Consorci de la Zona Franca de Barcelona.

Jordi Cornet died of cancer on 19 March 2021 at the age of 55.
