= Rosa Elena Cornejo Pazmiño =

Ecuadorian religious sister

Venerable Rosa Elena Cornejo Pazmiño
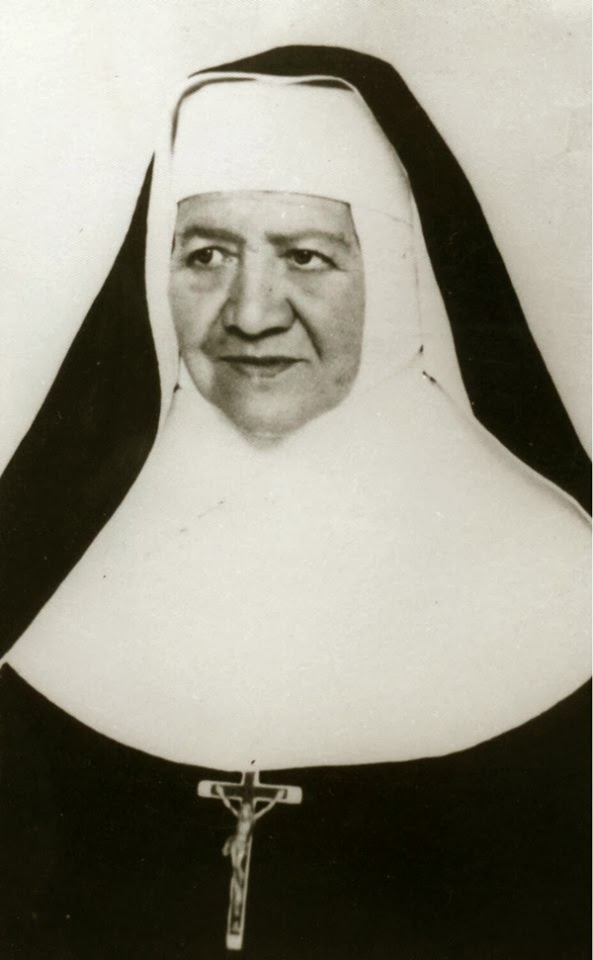
- Mother María Francisca of the Wounds

Virgin
- Born: 11 December 1874; Quito, Ecuador
- Died: 24 October 1964 (aged 89); Quito, Ecuador

Rosa Elena Cornejo Pazmiño (11 December 1874 – 24 October 1964), also known by her religious name María Francisca of the Wounds, was an Ecuadorian religious sister in the Roman Catholic Church. She founded the Hermanas Franciscanas Misioneras de la Inmaculada (Franciscan Missionary Sisters of the Immaculate).

Pope Benedict XVI recognized her life of heroic virtue and conferred upon her the title of Venerable on 20 December 2012. A miracle attributed to her and needed for her beatification is now under investigation.

== Life ==
Rosa Elena Cornejo Pazmiño was born on 11 December 1874 in Quito to Jose Cornejo. She received the sacrament of baptism moments after her birth.

Her mother, who died in 1893, provided for her education and Pazmiño's studies were later entrusted to nuns. She received the first holy communion in 1884. On 5 June 1902 she made her religious vows as a Franciscan tertiary.

In 1913, the congregation Pazmiño established, the Franciscan Missionaries of the Immaculata, was made aggregate to the Franciscan Order and Pazmiño was made Superior general in 1936.

In 1950 she travelled to Rome for the canonization of Mariana de Jesús de Paredes and to seek the approval of Pope Pius XII for the Franciscan Missionaries of the Immaculata. As a pilgrim she travelled to Assisi, too. The congregation received full papal approval in a decree John XXIII signed on 12 April 1962. Pazmiño died on 24 October 1964.

== Beatification process ==
The beatification process started in Quito on 22 March 1986. The diocesan process was ratified on 10 December 1993. The positio was then submitted to the Congregation for the Causes of Saints for evaluation in 2001. Pope Benedict XVI approved that Pazmiño lived a life of heroic virtue and declared her to be venerable on 20 December 2012. A miracle attributed to her intercession was investigated and ratified on 13 November 1998. The medical board in Rome approved the miracle in 2013.
