= Francisco Gavidia University =

University in El Salvador

- Universidad Francisco Gavidia
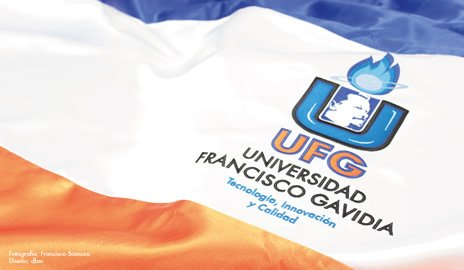
- Motto: "Tecnología, Innovación y Calidad"
- Type: Private
- Established: March 7, 1981
- Students: 13 000 (2013)
- Location: San Salvador, El Salvador; 13°41′48″N 89°13′09″W
- Colors: Orange; Blue; White
- Website: Universidad Francisco Gavidia

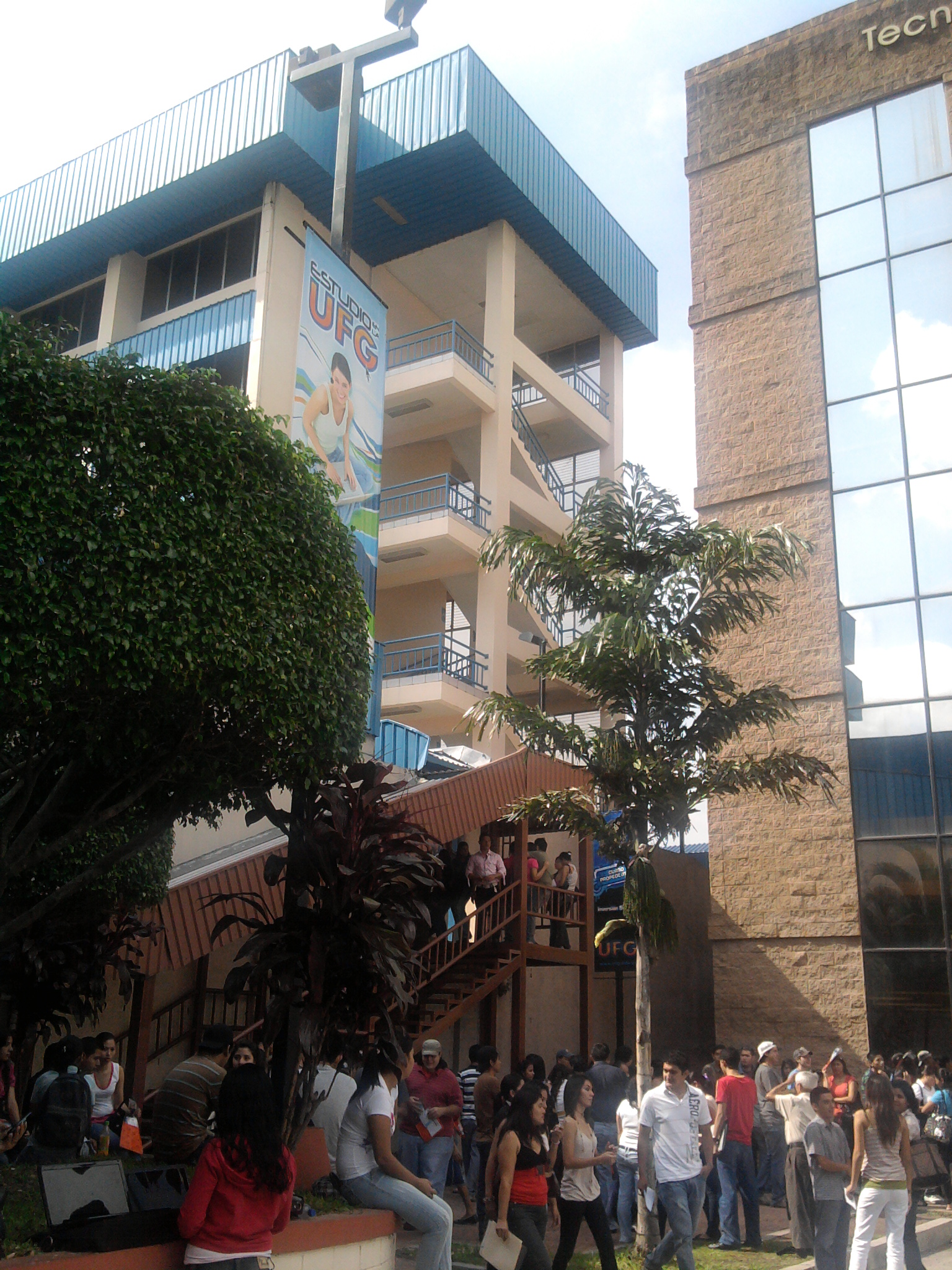
Francisco Gavidia University

Francisco Gavidia University (Spanish: Universidad Francisco Gavidia) (UFG) is a university located in San Salvador, El Salvador. The university was named after the famous Salvadoran scholar, Francisco Gavidia.
