= Franziska Cornet =

German operatic soprano and singing teacher

Franziska Cornet (23 January 1808 – 7 August 1870) was a German operatic soprano and singing teacher.

== Life ==
She was born Franziska Kiel in Kassel in 1808; her parents were singers and actors engaged with the theatre there. They later appeared in the court theatre of Braunschweig, where in March 1815 Franziska first appeared on stage. She was trained in singing by her father, and in March 1823 she appeared as a singer for the first time, as Thisbe in the opera Cinderella. She soon afterwards appeared as Princess Lydia in La neige by Daniel Auber, the Countess in Mozart's The Marriage of Figaro and Olivier in Jean de Paris by Boieldieu.

She married in 1825 Julius Cornet, the lead tenor at the court theatre of Braunschweig. A few months later they went to Hamburg and appeared there in the court theatre, returning to Braunschweig in 1832, where Julius Cornet was director of the theatre, and Franziska was a coloratura soprano.

Her roles included Isabella in Robert le diable by Meyerbeer and Leonora in Fidelio by Beethoven. She performed in both comic and serious roles. She moved with her husband to other theatres in Europe, including Vienna and Berlin. During a period in Hamburg she founded with her husband a singing conservatory. After his death in 1860 she returned to Braunschweig, where she taught young singers; she died there in 1870.

Her biographer in Allgemeine Deutsche Biographie (1876) wrote: "With the great purity of her soprano voice, and the particularly good training of her coloraturo, as well as her lively, adroit acting, Mrs Cornet belonged among the most important singers."
