= Cornett (surname) =

Cornett is a surname. Notable people with the surname include:

- Abbie Cornett (born 1966), American politician
- Betty Jane Cornett (1932–2006), American baseball player
- Bill Cornett, American musician
- Brack Cornett (outlaw) (died 1888), American outlaw
- Brad Cornett (born 1969), American baseball player
- Flip Cornett (1957–2004), American guitarist
- Jonathan Webster Cornett (1883–1973), Canadian mayor
- Leanza Cornett (1971–2020), American television personality
- Marshall E. Cornett (1898–1947), American businessman and politician
- Mick Cornett (born c. 1958), American politician
- Mitchell Cornett, American politician
- Natasha Cornett (born 1979), American murderer
- R. Orin Cornett (1913–2002), American physicist
- Samantha Cornett (born 1991), Canadian squash player
