= Charlotte de La Marck =

French noblewoman (1574–1594)

- suo jure Duchess of Bouillon
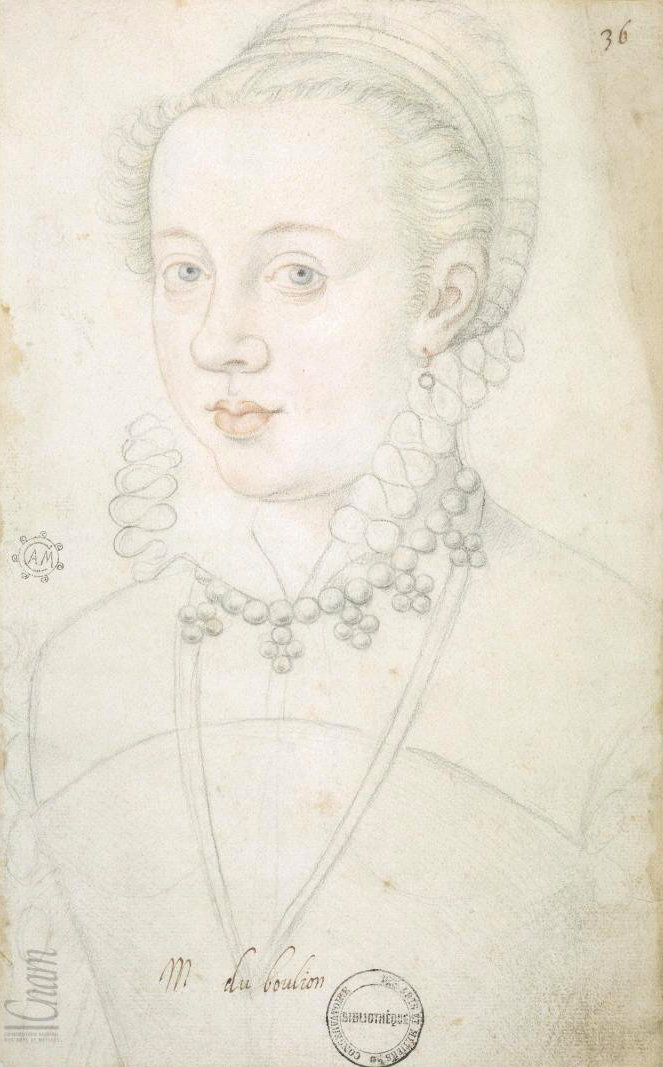
- Born: 5 November 1574
- Died: 15 May 1594 (aged 19)
- Spouse: Henri de La Tour d'Auvergne
- Father: Henri-Robert de la Marck
- Mother: Françoise de Bourbon

Charlotte de La Marck (5 November 1574 – 15 May 1594) was a ruling Princess of Sedan and a Duchess of Bouillon in her own right between 1588 and 1594. Her titles and the principality of Sedan passed in to the House of La Tour d'Auvergne through her marriage without issue.

== Biography ==
The last surviving child of Henri-Robert de la Marck Duke of Bouillon and Françoise de Bourbon. She was a member of the House of La Marck. Her older brother Guillaume-Robert died without surviving issue, and as such, Charlotte became the heiress to the Duchy of Bouillon, the Principality of Sedan and various other titles in 1588.

Her marriage was arranged by King Henri IV himself. Her husband, Henri de La Tour, was the son of the Viscount of Turenne and Eléonore de Montmorency, daughter of Anne de Montmorency. The couple were married on 19 November 1591. De La Tour, a Protestant, was marechal of France. Upon marriage, her spouse became her co-ruler and shared her titles.

In 1594, she died a week after giving birth to a son (who died the day he was born). She was buried at the Church of Saint-Laurent in Sedan.

Her husband later claimed the Duchy of Bouillon as his own and in 1676, his grandson Godefroy Maurice de La Tour d'Auvergne officially received Bouillon and Sedan. The Bouillon line of the House of La Marck died out with Charlotte.

== Ancestry ==
Ancestors of Charlotte de La Marck

16. Robert II de La Marck
8. Robert III de La Marck
17. Catherine de Croÿ
4. Robert IV de La Marck
18. Robert de Sarrebruck, Count of Roucy
9. Guillemette de Sarrebruck
19. Marie d'Amboise
2. Henri-Robert de la Marck
20. Jacques de Brézé, Count of Maulévrier
10. Louis de Brézé, Count of Maulévrier
21. Charlotte de Valois
5. Françoise de Brézé
22. Jean de Poitiers, Lord of Saint-Vallier
11. Diane de Poitiers
23. Jeanne de Batarnay
1. Charlotte de La Marck
24. John VIII, Count of Vendôme
12. Louis, Prince of La Roche-sur-Yon
25. Isabelle de Beauvau
6. Louis de Bourbon, Duke of Montpensier
26. Gilbert, Count of Montpensier
13. Louise de Bourbon, Duchess of Montpensier
27. Clara Gonzaga
3. Françoise de Bourbon
28. Philippe de Longwy, Lord of Pagny
14. Jean de Longwy, Lord of Givry
29. Jeanne de Bauffremont
7. Jacqueline de Longwy
30. Charles, Count of Angoulême
15. Jeanne legitimée d'Angoulême
31. Antoinette de Polignac
