= Guillaume-Robert de La Marck =

French Protestant prince

- Duc de Bouillon
- Other titles: Prince of Sedan
- Born: 1563; Kingdom of France
- Died: 11 January 1588 (aged 24–25); Switzerland
- Family: House of La Marck
- Father: Henri-Robert de La Marck
- Mother: Françoise de Bourbon-Vendôme

Guillaume-Robert de La Marck (1563 - 11 January 1588) was a French Protestant prince, duke and military commander. With the early death of his father Henri-Robert de La Marck in 1574 the 11 year old resided at his families Principality of Sedan under the regency of Françoise de Bourbon-Vendôme. When the regency expired in 1584 he allowed Sedan to become a nucleus for Protestant forces in their conflict with the Catholic League, leading attacks against Guise at Daigny.

In 1587 Guise counter attacked into the principality, but Bouillon decided to leave it under the regency of his sister, and went off to lead mercenary forces in Alsace for Navarre, losing the Battle of Vimory to Guise in late 1587. Having had little military success he retreated into Switzerland where he died in January 1588. Lacking children, his titles and territories were inherited by his sister, who married Turenne thus ending the La Marck control of Bouillon and the Principality of Sedan.

== Early life and family ==
Guillaume-Robert de La Marck was born in 1563, the son of Henri-Robert de La Marck and Françoise de Bourbon-Vendôme, the daughter of Montpensier. Baptised as a Protestant, he accompanied his uncle Montpensier on a mission to England. When at last he reached his majority in 1584, he took over leadership of the principality from his mother who had acted as regent during his minority years.

== Reign of Henri III ==
Bouillon played host to Navarre in 1574, who had fled to the principality of Sedan from court where he was a prisoner, in the final year of Henri-Robert's life.

Having assumed full control of his principality in 1584, he improved the defences of city, building a bastion. Protestant soldiers used Sedan as a base, struck out in 1584 at Guise, attacking at Rocroi. In response the liguers attacked Douzy but Bouillon led a counter attack against ligue forces, routing them at Daigny.

In 1587 Guise invaded the Principality of Sedan, hoping to drive out the Huguenots that Bouillon sheltered in his territory. In the same year Bouillon decided to leave his territory under the regency of his sister and go on the offensive against the ligue, entering Alsace at the head of a mercenary army. After being defeated by Guise at the Battle of Vimory he handed over command to Conti and retired into Switzerland, where shortly thereafter he died.

A close ally to Henri IV, his death in 1588 came as a blow to the prince. With his death Lorraine invaded his principality. Having had no offspring the principality was intended to be inherited by his sister Charlotte de La Marck Three years later Turenne married her, causing the duchy of Bouillon and principality of Sedan to enter a new family, that of La Tour d'Auvergne.

== Sources ==
- Baird, Henry (1880). Rise of the Huguenots Vol 2 of 2. Hodder & Stoughton.
- Congar, Pierre (1969). Sedan et le pays sedanais, vingt siècles d'histoire. Guénégaud.
- Holt, Mack P. (2005). The French Wars of Religion, 1562-1629. Cambridge University Press.
- Salmon, J.H.M (1975). Society in Crisis: France during the Sixteenth Century. Metheun & Co.
- Sartelet, Alain (1991). La Principauté de Sedan. Éditions Terres Ardennaises.
