= Fleuranges =

Fleuranges may refer to:

- Robert III de La Marck, son of the seigneur of Fleuranges
- Florange, Moselle, France, of which Fleuranges was a former name
