= Principality of Sedan =

Former monarchy in Europe

Principality of Sedan Principauté de Sedan (French)
- 1424–1642
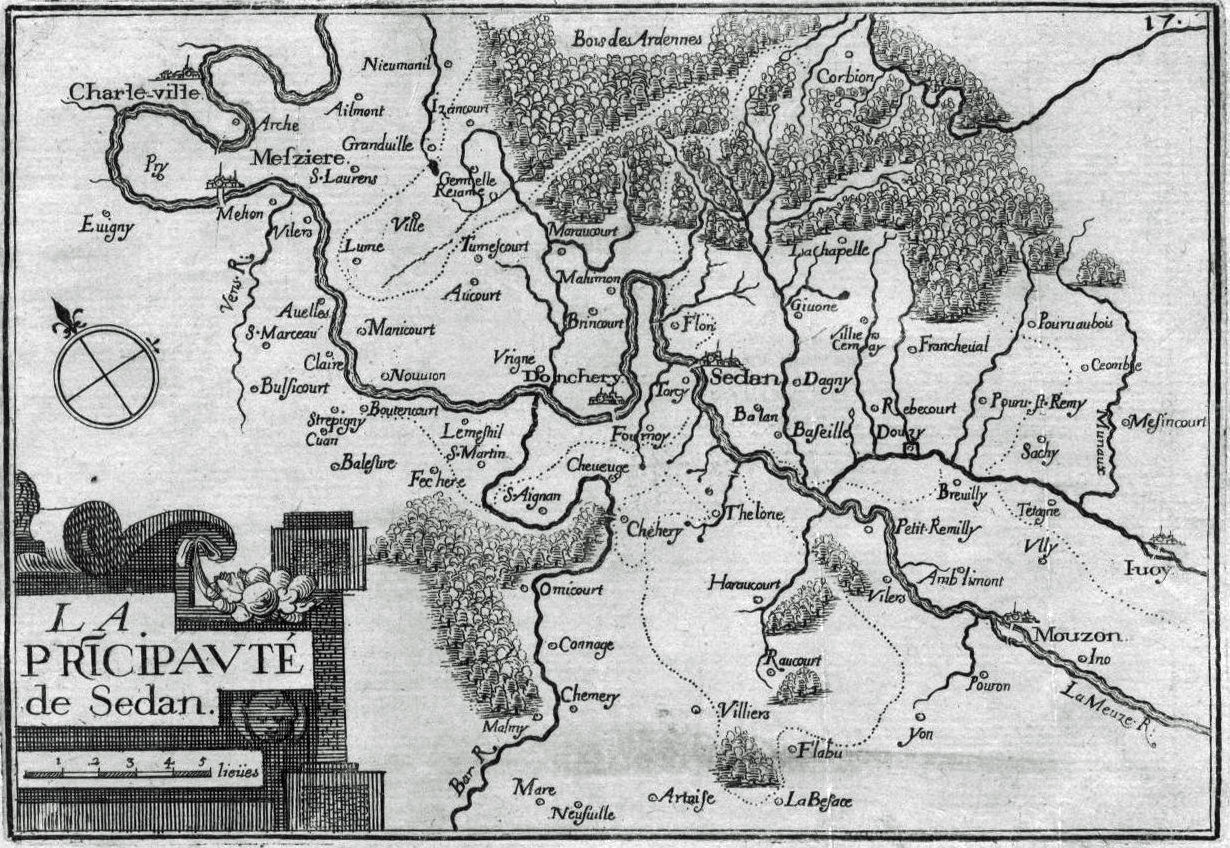
- Map of the Principality
- Status: In personal union with the Duchy of Bouillon; (1487-1642)
- Capital: Sedan
- Religion: Protestantism
- Government: Principality
- Prince of Sedan
  - 1424–1454: Eberhard II (first)
  - 1623–1642: Frédéric Maurice (last)
- Historical era: Late Middle Ages
  - Established: 1424
  - French annexation: 1642
Succeeded by
Kingdom of France

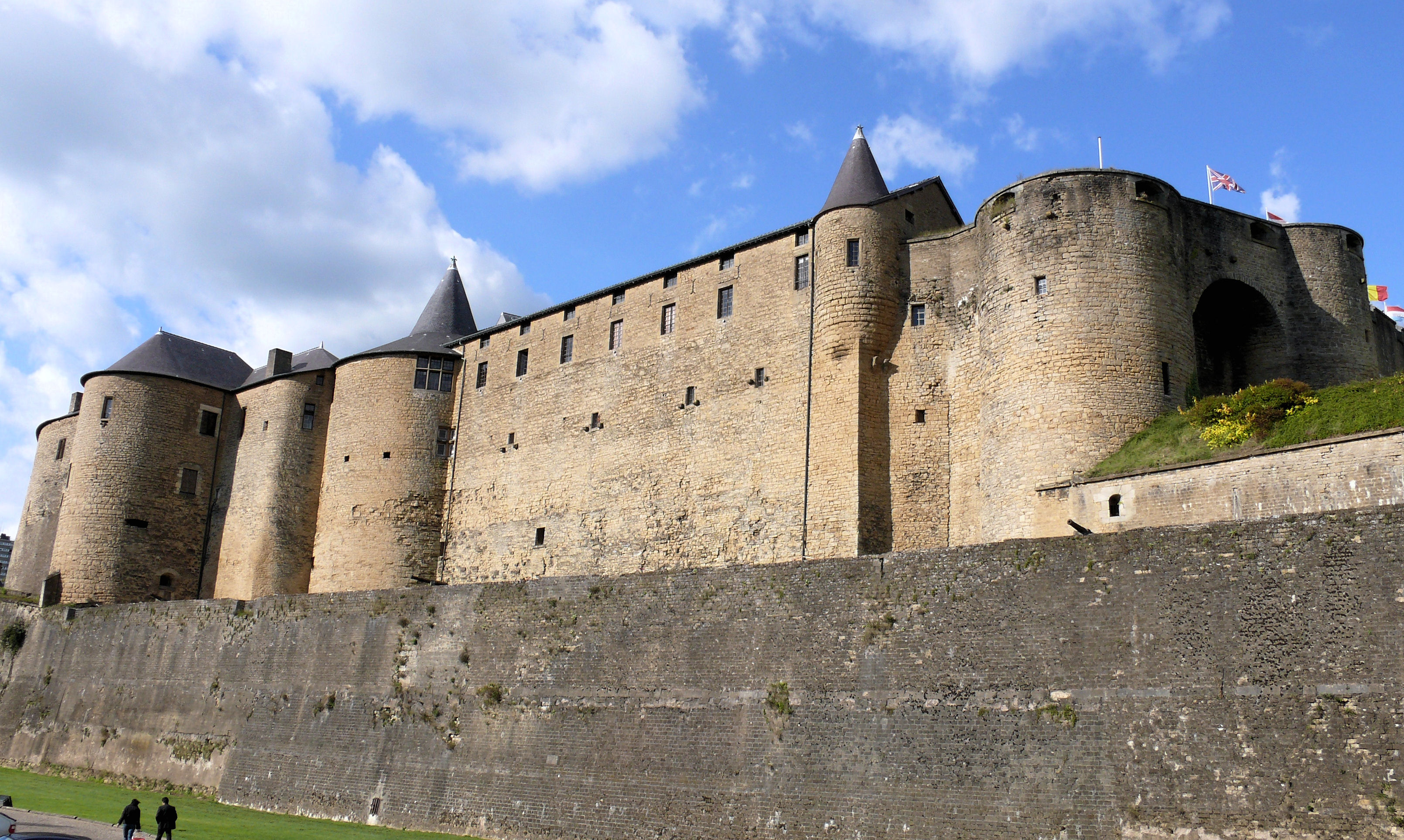
The Château de Sedan, seat of the Lords, and later Princes, of Sedan

The Principality of Sedan (French: Principauté de Sedan) was an independent Protestant state centered on the Château de Sedan (now the city of Sedan) in the Ardennes. It was ruled by the Prince of Sedan (French: Prince de Sedan), who belonged to the noble La Marck and La Tour d'Auvergne families. The Princes of Sedan asserted and acquired recognition of their sovereignty gradually between the 1520s and 1580s by means of adopting the princely title, minting coin, legislating and signing treaties. In 1641, during the Thirty Years' War, the Prince submitted to France and his principality was occupied the following year. In 1651 the reduced principality was exchanged for other lands in France and was annexed to the crown.

== Geography ==
The following villages were located in the Principality of Sedan: Illy, Givonne, Douzy, Pouru-Saint-Remy, Rubécourt-et-Lamécourt, Balan, Fleigneux, Bazeilles, La Chapelle, La Moncelle, Villers-Cernay, Raucourt-et-Flaba, Noyers-Pont-Maugis, Wadelincourt, Haraucourt, Thelonne, Bulson, and Angecourt.

== History ==
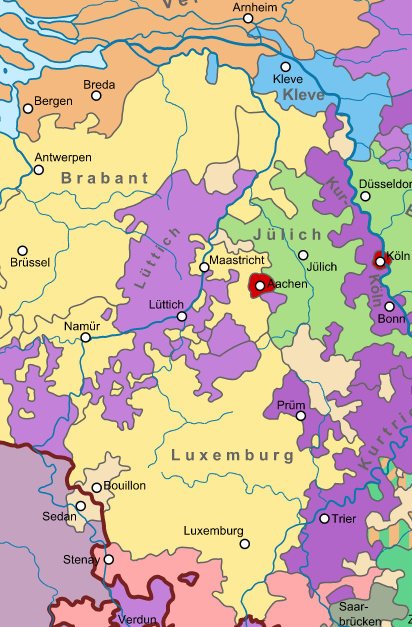
Key locations of the Luxembourg campaigns on a 1618 map. "Sedan" is in the bottom left, next to "Bouillon".

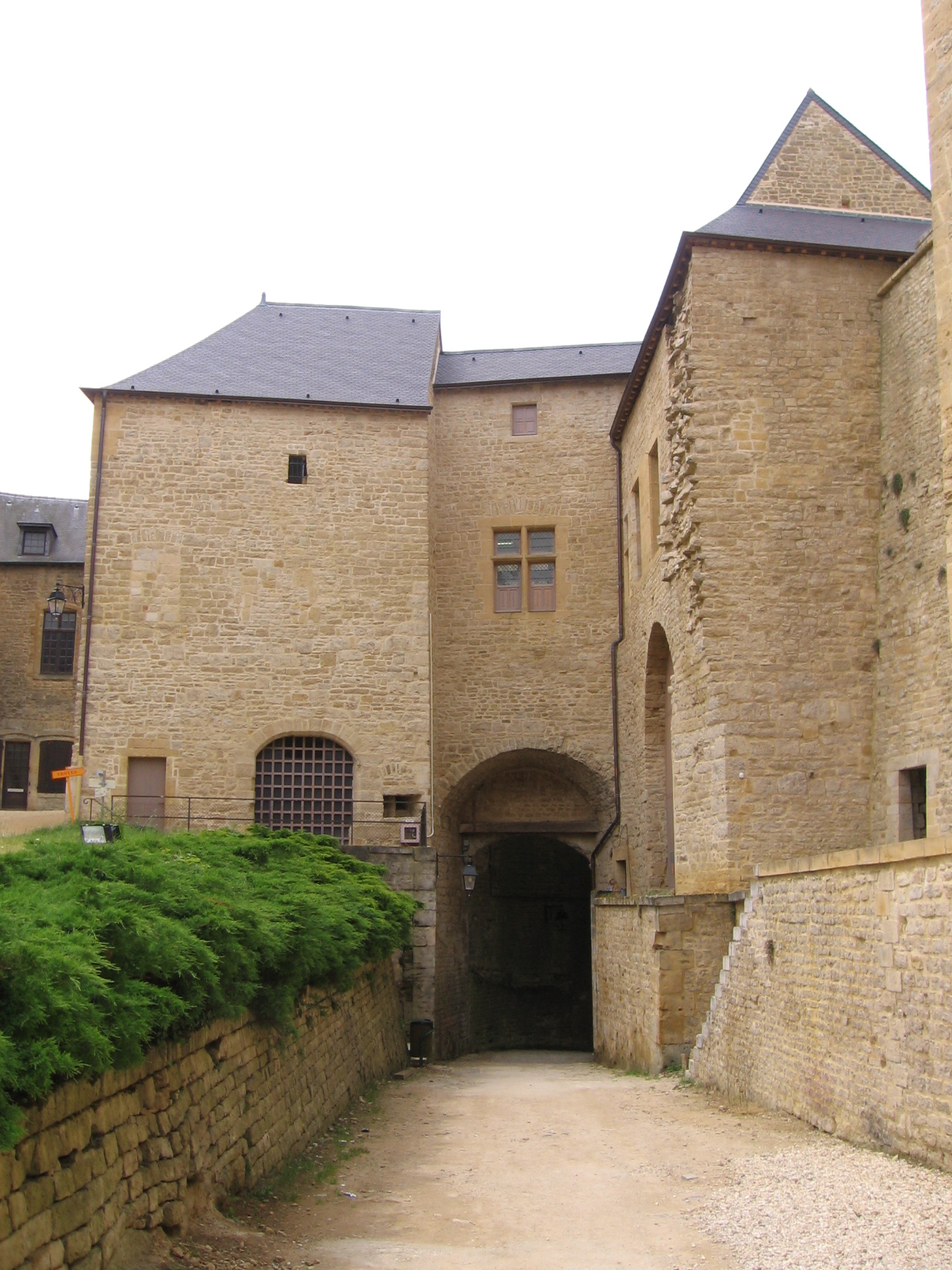
Inside the fortifications of the Château de Sedan

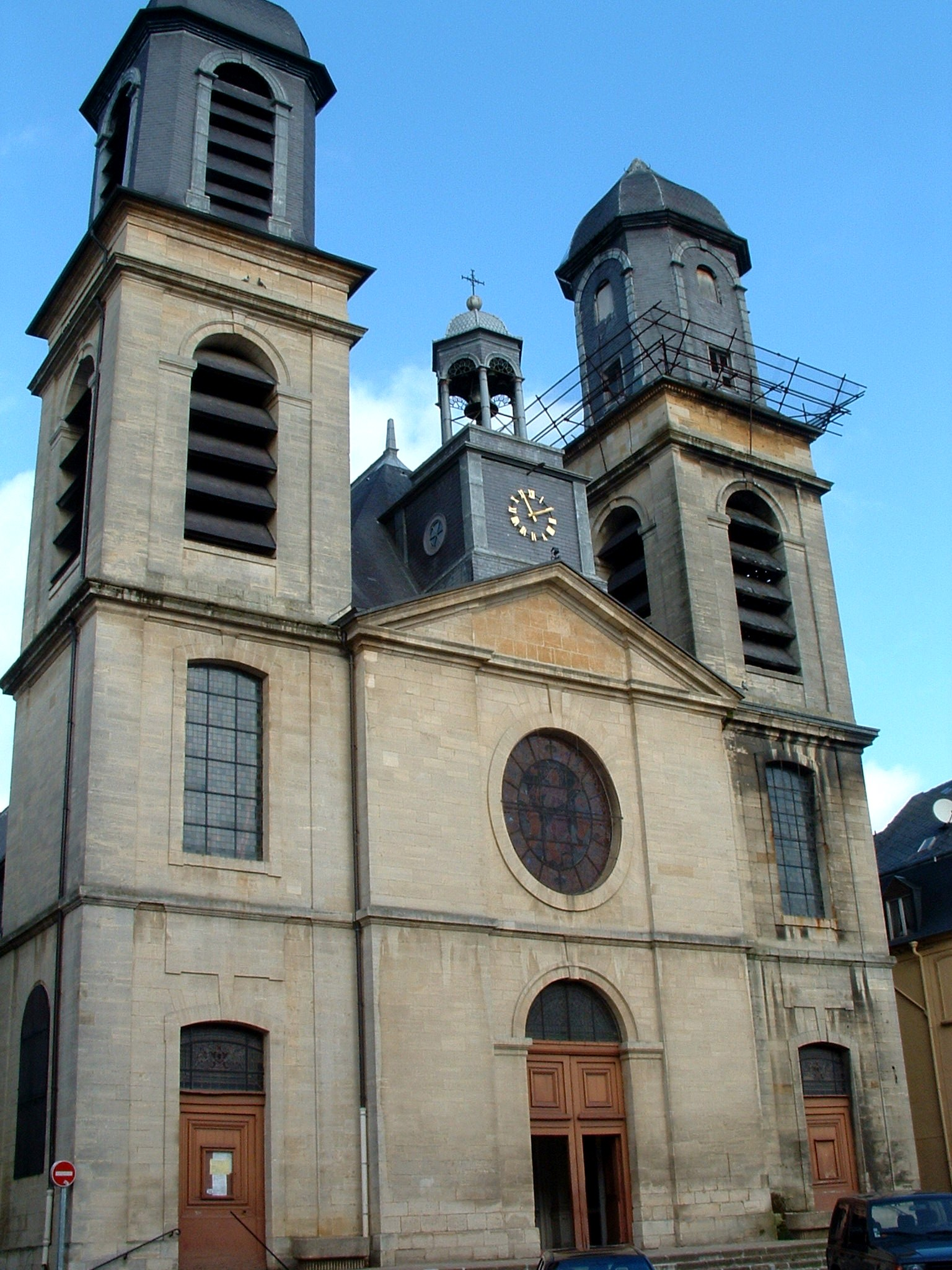
The Protestant church in Sedan, later Catholicized and re-dedicated to Charles Borromeo

The history of Sedan begins in 1424, when Eberhard II von der Mark (1364–1440) (son of Eberhard I von der Mark and grandson of Engelbert II of the Mark, ruler of the County of Mark) began construction of the Château de Sedan in the vicinity of the Benedictine Abbey of Mouzon. Erard II von der Mark was the first ruler to style himself Lord of Sedan (Fr.: seigneur de Sedan). In the following years, the town of Sedan grew up in the area between the Château de Sedan and the Meuse.

In the wake of the Protestant Reformation, Henri-Robert de la Marck and his wife Françoise de Bourbon-Vendôme were attracted to the Huguenot movement. In 1560, they declared Sedan's independence from the Kingdom of France. Particularly in the wake of the 1562 Massacre of Vassy, Sedan became one of the leading refuges for French speaking Protestants. The Academy of Sedan, founded in 1579, became one of the chief Huguenot academies.

With the death of Guillaume Robert de la Marck in 1588, the principality passed to his daughter, Charlotte de La Marck. In 1591, she married Henri de La Tour d'Auvergne, who thereupon assumed her titles, becoming Prince of Sedan and Duke of Bouillon. As such, the principality passed from the House of La Marck to the House of La Tour d'Auvergne. Charlotte died childless in 1594, and the principality was ultimately inherited by Henri de La Tour d'Auvergne's son by his second marriage. In 1593 and 1595, Henri unsuccessfully participated in the Luxembourg campaigns with Philip of Nassau of the Dutch Republic against Spanish-held Luxembourg. He only temporarily occupied several border fortresses, namely Yvoix (present-day Carignan), La Ferté-sur-Chiers, and Chauvency-le-Château.

Henri de La Tour d'Auvergne was accused of participating in the 1602 plot to assassinate Henry IV of France led by Charles de Gontaut, duc de Biron and the 1604 intrigues involving Henry IV's former mistress, Catherine Henriette de Balzac d'Entragues. In 1604, Henry IV declared Henri de La Tour d'Auvergne's lands forfeit to the crown of France and led an expedition to Sedan in 1606. He also participated in a 1613 noble revolt against the king. Henri de La Tour d'Auvergne's son, Frédéric Maurice de La Tour d'Auvergne, shared his father's antipathy to royal power. In 1630, he participated in a revolt led by Gaston, Duke of Orléans.

Sedan finally lost its independence during the Thirty Years' War. In spite of a victory over French royal forces at the Battle of La Marfée, held 6 July 1641, it soon became obvious that Sedan could no longer resist the forces of Louis XIII. In 1642, Frédéric Maurice de La Tour d'Auvergne participated in the failed conspiracy led by Henri Coiffier de Ruzé, Marquis of Cinq-Mars; in the wake of Cinq-Mars' execution, Frédéric Maurice de La Tour d'Auvergne struck a deal with Louis XIII, who agreed to spare his life and give him a commission in the French army in Italy in exchange for the relinquishment of Sedan's sovereignty. Sedan was thus annexed to the French crown in 1642. Frédéric Maurice de La Tour d'Auvergne's younger brother, Henri de la Tour d'Auvergne, Vicomte de Turenne would go on to achieve fame as France's leading general. In 1709, at the request of Lord Chancellor of France Henri François d'Aguesseau, the Parlement of Paris passed a decree reaffirming the French crown's sovereignty over Sedan.

== List of rulers ==
=== Lords of Sedan, 1424–1560 ===
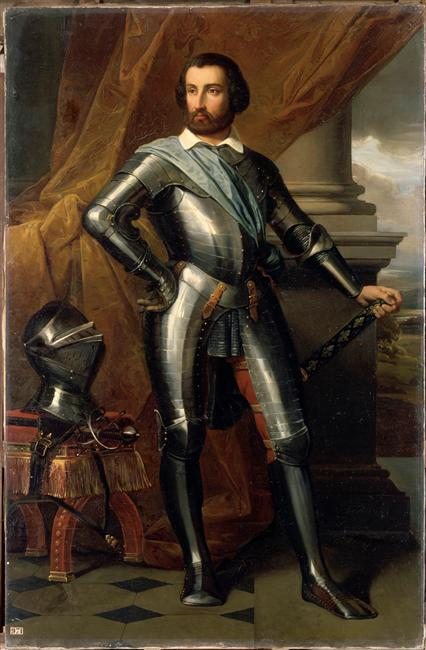
Robert Fleuranges III de La Marck, Lord of Sedan 1536–37

From	To	Lord of Sedan	Other titles Held
1424	1440	Eberhard II von der Mark	Lord of Arenberg
1440		Johann II von der Mark	Lord of Arenberg
	1487	Robert I de la Marck	Châtelain of Bouillon
1487	1536	Robert II de la Marck	Duke of Bouillon
1536	1537	Robert Fleuranges III de La Marck	Duke of Bouillon
1537	1556	Robert IV de la Marck	Duke of Bouillon, Earl of Braine & Maulevrier
1556	1560	Henri Robert de la Marck	Duke of Bouillon

=== Princes of Sedan, 1560–1642 ===
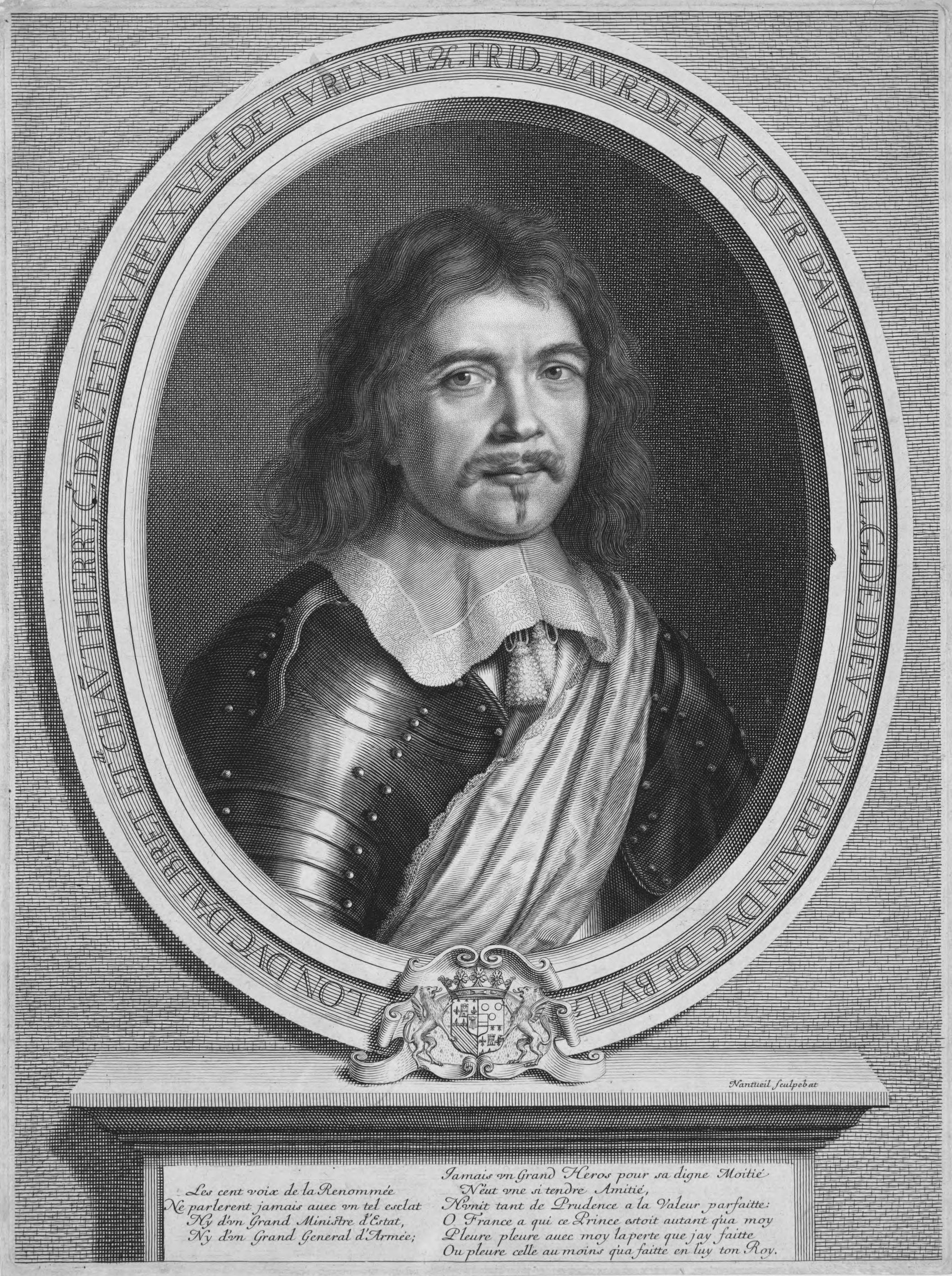
Frédéric Maurice de La Tour d'Auvergne, the last Prince of Sedan, 1623–42

From	To	Prince of Sedan	Other titles Held
1560	1574	Henri Robert de la Marck	Duke of Bouillon
1574	1588	Guillaume Robert de la Marck	Duke of Bouillon, Marquess of Cotron
1588	1594	Charlotte de La Marck	Duchess of Bouillon
1591	1623	Henri de La Tour d'Auvergne	Duke of Bouillon, Count of Montfort, Count of Nègrepelisse, Viscount of Turenne, Viscount of Castillon, Viscount of Lanquais
1623	1642	Frédéric Maurice de La Tour d'Auvergne	Duke of Bouillon

=== French Governors after the annexation to France, 1642–1789 ===
- 1642-1662: Abraham de Fabert d'Esternay
- 1662-1692: Georges de Guiscard, Count of La Bourlie
- 1692-1720: Louis Guiscard, son of the preceding
- 1720-1725: Jacques Eléonor Rouxel de Grancey
- 1725-1739: François de Franquetot de Coigny
- 1739-1750: François d'Harcourt, maternal great-grandson of Marshal de Fabert
- 1750-1777: Anne Pierre d'Harcourt, brother of the preceding
- 1777-1789: Guy André Pierre de Montmorency-Laval

== Religious leaders ==
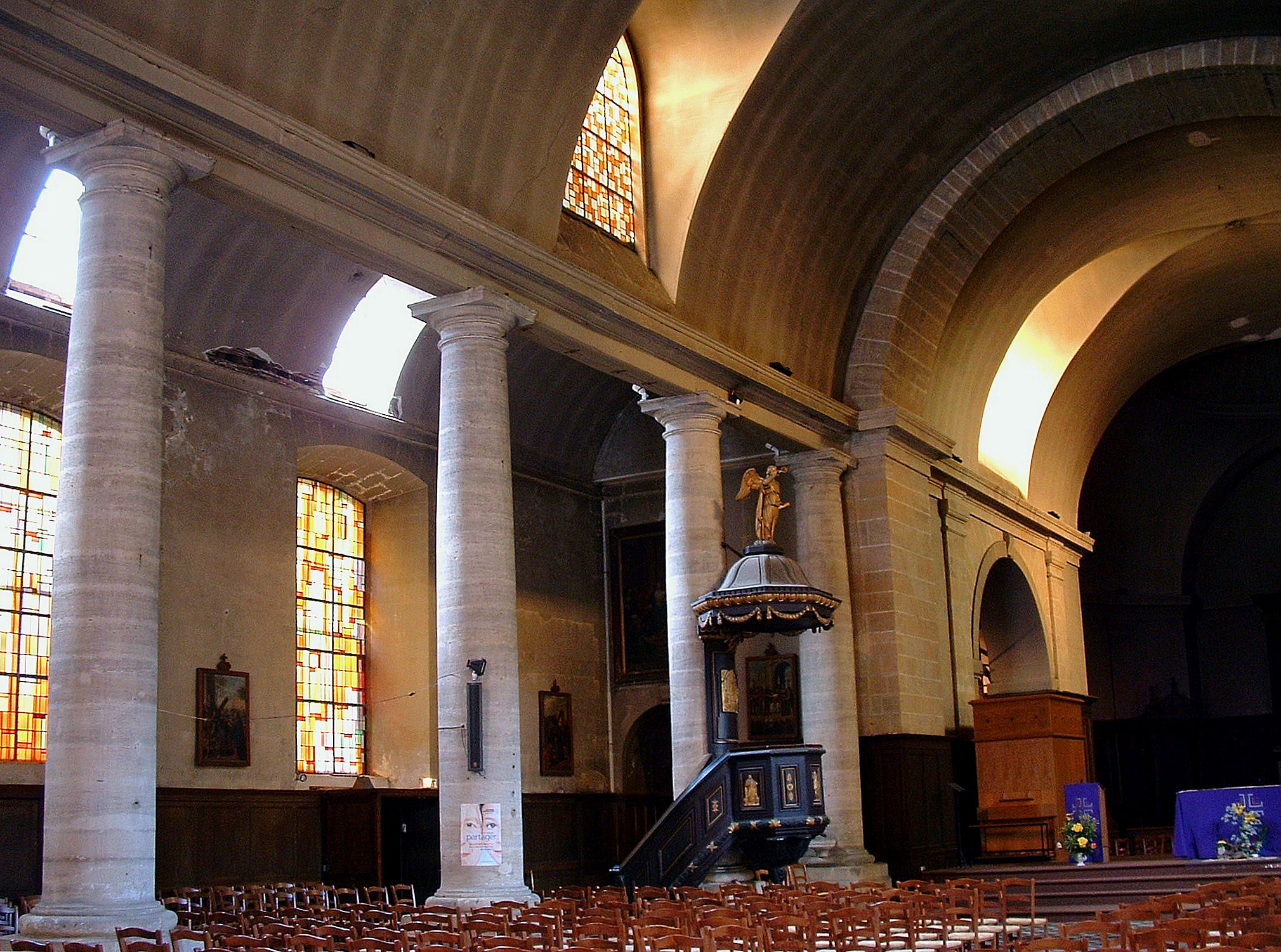
Interior of the Protestant church in Sedan.

=== Protestant pastors ===
- Guido de Bres, 1562
- Pierre Du Moulin, 1621–58
- Pierre Jurieu, 1675–81

The Princes of Sedan founded the Academy of Sedan for the training of Protestant pastors.

=== Protestant refugees ===
- Nicasius le Febure
- Philippe de Mornay
- Anne d'Alègre and her son Guy XX de Laval
- Elisabeth de Hauteville, wife of Odet de Coligny
- the daughters of Maximilien de Béthune, Duke of Sully
- Jean Errard
- Pierre Pithou
- Louis, Count of Soissons
- Frederick V, Elector Palatine

=== Famous burials in the Protestant church ===
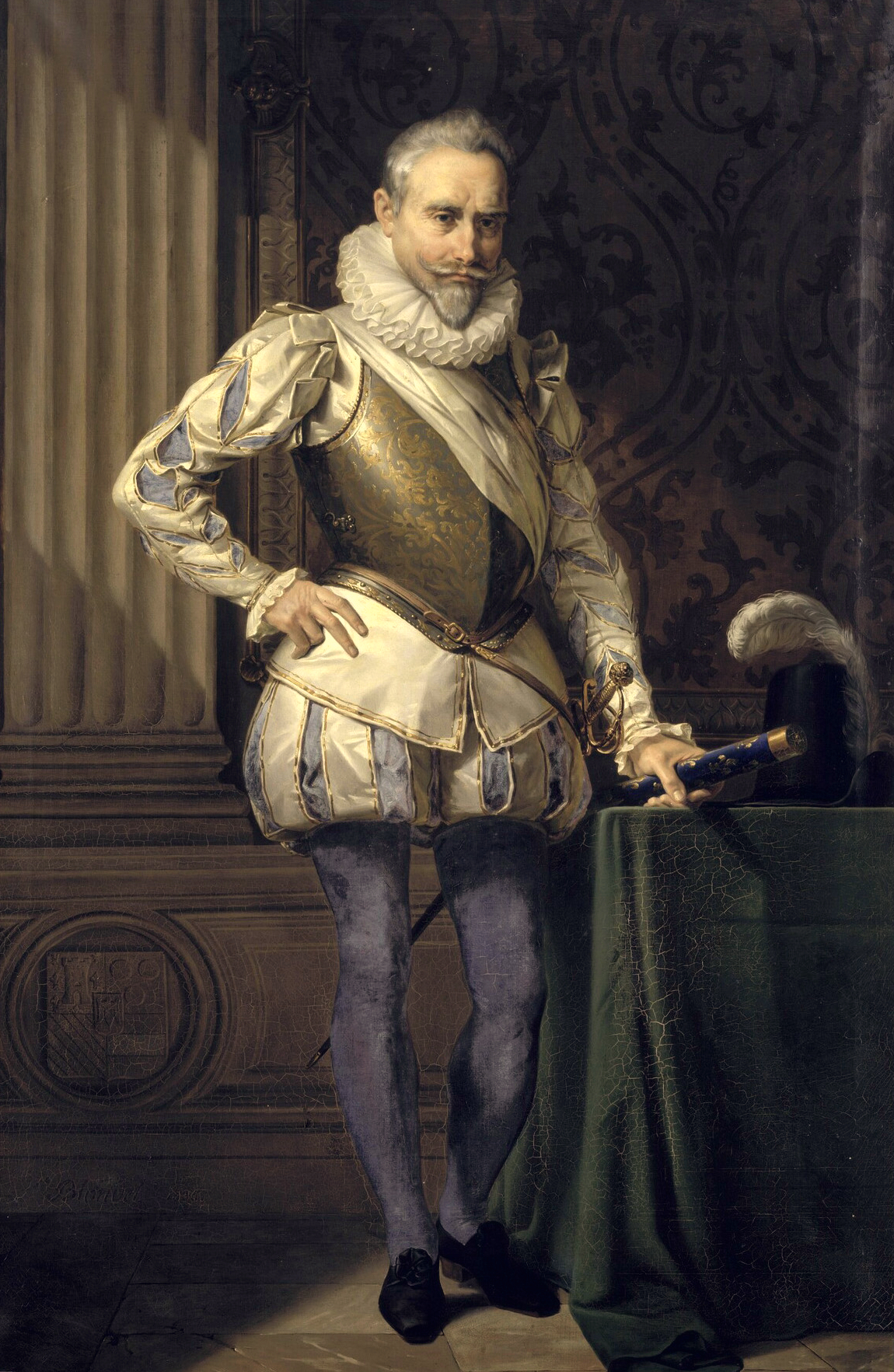
Henri de La Tour d'Auvergne, Duke of Bouillon, Prince of Sedan 1591–1623, who was buried in the Protestant church in Sedan.

The Protestant Princes of Sedan were buried in the Protestant church in Sedan. Burials in the church include:

- Henri de La Tour d'Auvergne (1623)
- Louis Hanau (1627) son of Countess Catharina Belgica of Nassau
- Julienne Catherine de la Tour d'Auvergne (1637), daughter of Henri de La Tour d'Auvergne
- Countess Elisabeth of Nassau (1642)
- John Philip Frederick of the Palatinate (1650), son of Frederick V, Elector Palatine
- Henri de Roye de La Rochefoucauld (1656), vidame of Laon, son of Julienne Catherine de la Tour d'Auvergne
- Guy de Roye de La Rochefoucauld (1684), vidame of Laon, younger son of Julienne Catherine de la Tour

== Other famous residents ==
- Bernard Palissy, famous potter
