= Battle of Vimory =

Battle in the French Wars of Religion

Date	26 October 1587
Location	Vimory, Loiret, France 47.943°N 2.677°E
Result	Catholic victory

Belligerents
Royal Army (Catholics)	Huguenots, German and Swiss mercenaires

Commanders and leaders
Henri I, Duke of Guise	Fabien I, Burgrave of Dohna; Guillaume-Robert de La Marck

Strength
?	25,000

Casualties and losses
?	?

The Battle of Vimory, occurred on 26 October 1587 between the French royal (Catholic) forces of King Henry III of France commanded by Henri I, Duke of Guise and German and Swiss mercenaries commanded by Fabien I, Burgrave of Dohna and the duke of Bouillon who were hired to assist Henry of Navarre's Huguenot forces during the eighth and final war (1585-1598) of the French Wars of Religion.

The Protestant mercenaries were funded by Elizabeth I of England and King Frederick II of Denmark. After having pillaged the Lorraine region, they arrived in Burgundy and entered into the Beauce region. However, conflicts divided the two commanders and their German and Swiss troops.

The Swiss troops were surprised by Henry of Guise's army, and were routed. The reiters retreated to the castle of Auneau and the Swiss decided to negotiate with the royal troops.

== Bibliography ==
- Jouanna, Arlette and Jacqueline Boucher, Dominique Biloghi, Guy Thiec. Histoire et dictionnaire des Guerres de religion. Collection: Bouquins. Paris: Laffont, 1998. ISBN 2-221-07425-4.
