= Republic of Bouillon =

Sister Republic

Coordinates: 49°47′44″N 5°4′5″E

Republic of Bouillon République bouillonnaise
- 1794–1795
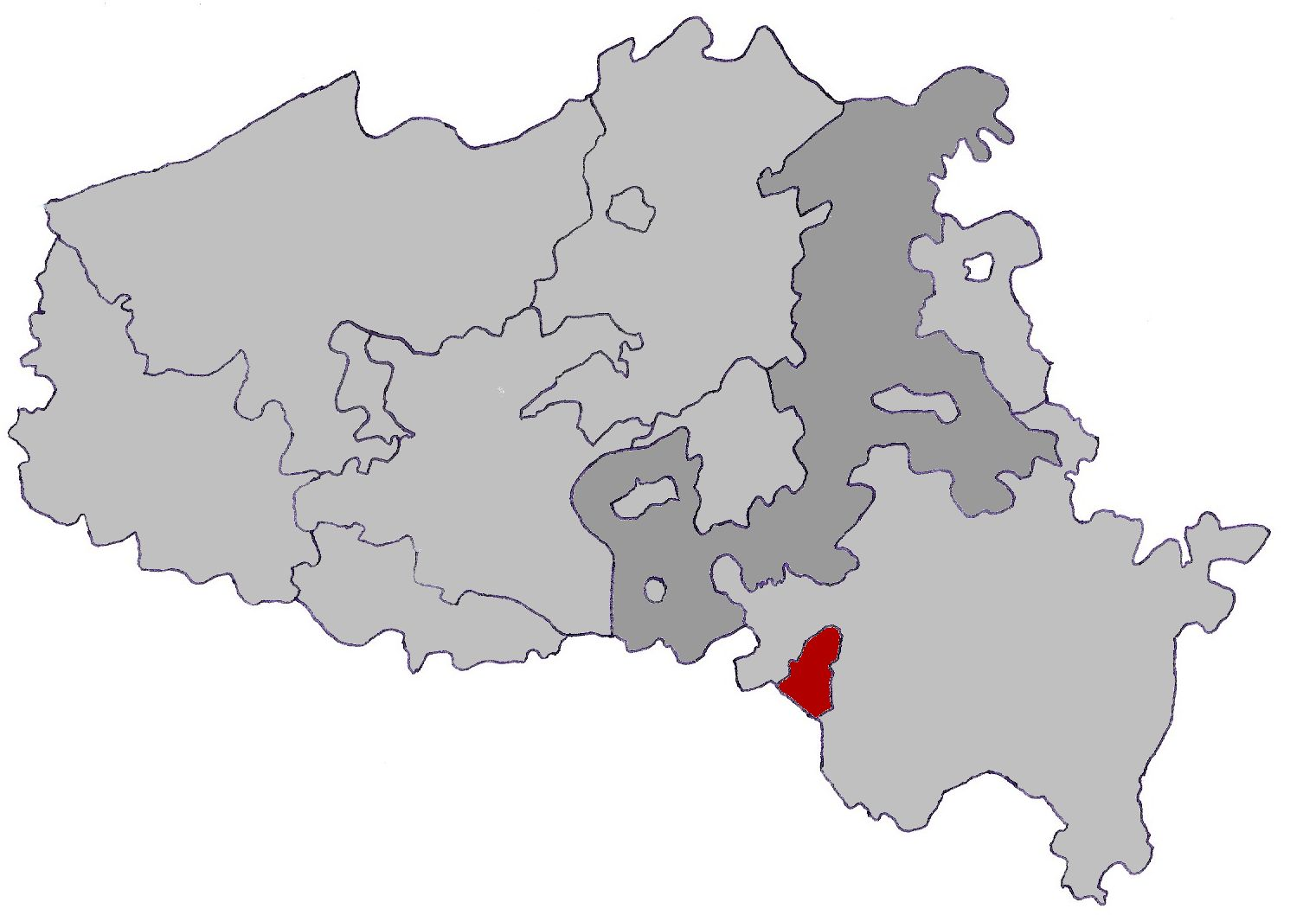
- The predecessor Duchy of Bouillon as at 1787, shown with the Austrian Netherlands (light grey) and Liège and Stavelot-Malmedy (dark grey)
- Status: Client state of France
- Capital: Bouillon
- Common languages: French; Walloon
- Religion: Catholic
- Demonym: Bouillonnaise
- Historical era: French Revolutionary Wars
  - Abolition of manorial and feudal rights: 26 May 1790
  - Ducal constitution: 23 March/1 May 1794
  - French occupation: 19 November 1792
  - Duke imprisoned: 7 February 1794
  - Republic maybe proclaimed: 24 April 1794
  - Annexed to France: 26 October 1795
- Currency: French livre
Preceded by	Succeeded by
Duchy of Bouillon	French First Republic
- Today part of: Belgium

The Republic of Bouillon was a short-lived French client republic, around the city of Bouillon in present-day Belgium, based on the Duchy of Bouillon, which had existed between France and the Austrian Netherlands since the 15th century. Reforms, sponsored by the duke, abolishing manorialism and feudalism and establishing a constitutional basis for the monarchy did not prevent what many sources describe as the proclamation of a republic in April 1794. The claimed republic was short-lived, however, as the territory was annexed by the French First Republic on 26 October 1795.

In 1815, after the Napoleonic Wars, the duchy was absorbed into the promoted Grand Duchy of Luxembourg, becoming a part of Belgium when that nation was founded in the 1830s.

== Influence of the French Revolution ==
Godefroy III (b. 1728, r. 1771, d. 1792), duke of Bouillon and prince of Turenne, favourable to the French Revolution, committed his duchy to the path of reform by an edict of 24 February 1790 and supported his assemblée générale (parliament) when it voted to abolish manorial and feudal rights on 26 May 1790.

On 23 March or 1 May 1792, the duchy became a constitutional monarchy, becoming occupied by the French Revolutionary Army the following 19 November. Duke Jacques Léopold, who had succeeded his father in December 1792 but lived at the Château de Navarre, near Évreux (the last dukes of Bouillon did not reside in their duchy), was arrested and imprisoned in France under The Terror on 7 February 1794; like his father, he was a French citizen, as well as prince of a sovereign state.

== Proclamation of the Republic ==
Noting that contact with the sovereign duke was temporarily impossible, on 24 April 1794 the assemblée générale convened a Special Meeting of the Representatives of the People (French: Assemblée extraordinaire des représentants du peuple bouillonnais), which may have proclaimed a republic. Some sources believe, however, that the assemblée générale did not proclaim the end of the ducal monarchy, but only reaffirmed the "essential democratic and popular" state and the transfer of executive authority to an ad hoc Council of State, meaning the ducal monarchy would not have really ended. Subsequent official documents cease to refer to the duke, possibly due to his imprisonment in France.

Départements of the French Empire in the Low Countries, 1811

The territory was annexed to the French First Republic on 26 October 1795 (4 Brumaire, year IV in the French Revolutionary Calendar). Its land was divided between the départements of Forêts, Ardennes and Sambre-et-Meuse, but not before the assemblée générale publicly denounced the annexation.

From 10 December 1793 (10 Frimaire II) the duke had been deprived of rents from his estates under French decree. A decree of 22 March 1800 (1 Germinal VIII), after Napoléon's accession to the French throne, ended the sequester of the ducal estates and allowed him to regain possession. However, he was still obliged to pay the 25% of assessed value he had offered to pay, and woods larger than 150 hectares (370 acres) were returned to him only on a provisional basis. The loss of his income during the five years had left him with 3 million livres in debts, he was hounded by the tax collectors and his creditors, and his expenses exceeded current revenues by 200 000 francs every year. Jacques Léopold died, without issue, in February 1802 as citoyen Léopold la Tour d'Auvergne.

== After the war ==
After the end of the French occupation in April 1814, the territory of the former duchy was occupied by the Allied Powers, the duchy was restored briefly, headed by a British admiral from Jersey, Philippe d'Auvergne, cousin of the ducal family, adopted by duke Godefroy, who had agreed with the assemblée générale as heir should Jacques Léopold die without issue.

At the Congress of Vienna, however, another of Godefroy's cousins, Charles Alain de Rohan, Prince of Guéméné, a major-general of the Imperial and Royal Austrian Army and a citizen of the Austrian Empire since 1808, challenged the validity of the succession and claimed the ducal throne for himself.

After several months of uncertainty, Article 69 of the Final Act of the Congress of Vienna established the integration of the duchy into the Grand Duchy of Luxembourg (in personal union with the United Kingdom of the Netherlands) as of 9 June 1815. The question of compensation for rights-holders and other ducal pretenders was not settled, however, and became a subject of legal dispute for over a decade; the princes of Guéméné now hold claim to the throne of the extinct duchy. The king of the Netherlands, as grand-duke of Luxembourg, took possession of the duchy on 22 July 1815.

As a part of the Belgian Revolution, Bouillon rose up in revolt from 30 October 1830, leading to the surrender of the castle garrison. Bouillon, with the French-speaking grand-ducal territories, became part of Belgium (as the province of Luxembourg), with Belgium becoming de facto independent from the Kingdom of the Netherlands. The Treaty of the XXIV Articles, signed 15 November 1831 but only ratified in 1839 by all parties, recognised the de jure independence of Belgium, subsequently reinforced by Treaties of London in 1839 and in 1867.
