= Albert Rohan =

Austrian diplomat and politician (1936–2019)

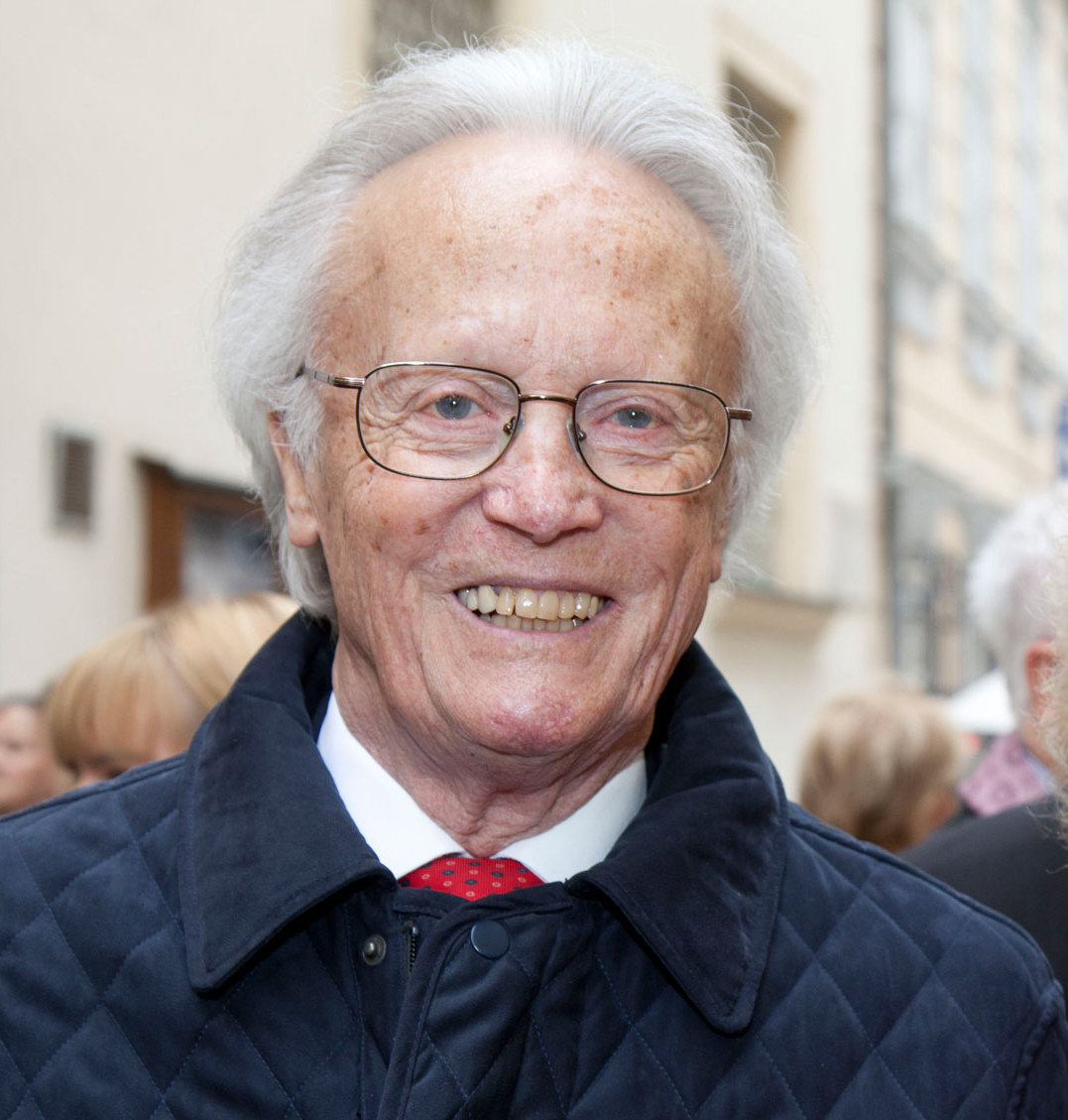
- Albert Rohan, Duke of Bouillon and Montbazon, 2015
- Born: 9 May 1936; Melk, Lower Austria
- Died: 4 June 2019 (aged 83)
- Education: University of Vienna (Doctor of Laws), College of Europe (Bruges)
- Occupation: Diplomat
- Known for: Secretary General of the Austrian Ministry (1996–2001)

Albert Rohan, Duke of Bouillon and Duke of Montbazon (Prince Albert de Rohan) (9 May 1936 – 4 June 2019) was an Austrian diplomat. He served as Secretary General (Generalsekretär) of the Austrian Foreign Ministry from 1996 to 2001.

== Biography ==
Albert Rohan was born in Melk, Lower Austria. He studied law at the University of Vienna and became a Doctor of Laws in 1960. He attended the College of Europe in Bruges, Belgium 1961-62 (Gottfried Leibniz Promotion), and joined the Austrian diplomatic service in 1963. From 1977 to 1981, he was Director at the Executive Office of the UN Secretary General. He was Director of the Department for International Organisations in the Austrian foreign ministry 1982–85, Ambassador to Argentina, Uruguay and Paraguay 1985–89, Director of the Department for Central-, East- and South-East Europe 1990–95, Deputy Director-General for Political Affairs 1993–95, National Coordinator for the Central European Initiative 1994-95 and Secretary General for Foreign Affairs (equivalent to Permanent Secretary in the UK civil service) 1996–2001.

He was President of the Austro-American Society and the Austrian Society for European Policies. He was appointed United Nations Deputy Special Envoy of the Secretary-General for the Future Status Process for Kosovo in 2005. He was a member of the Independent Commission on Turkey.

He was a member of a princely branch of the French House of Rohan; his ancestors fled from France to Austria during the French Revolution. As a consequence, he was the heir to the Duchy of Bouillon and the Duchy of Montbazon. As he had no children, upon his death in late 2019, the titles went to his 3rd cousin-once-removed Charles Raoul, Duke of Bouillon and Montbazon (b. 1954), who is the current head of the Rohan-Rochefort branch of the Rohan dynasty.

== Works ==
- Diplomat am Rande der Weltpolitik. Begegnungen, Beobachtungen, Erkenntnisse. Molden, Wien 2002, ISBN 3-85485-079-4 (in German).
