= Sedan Castle =

Coordinates: 49°42′7″N 4°56′58″E

- Château de Sedan
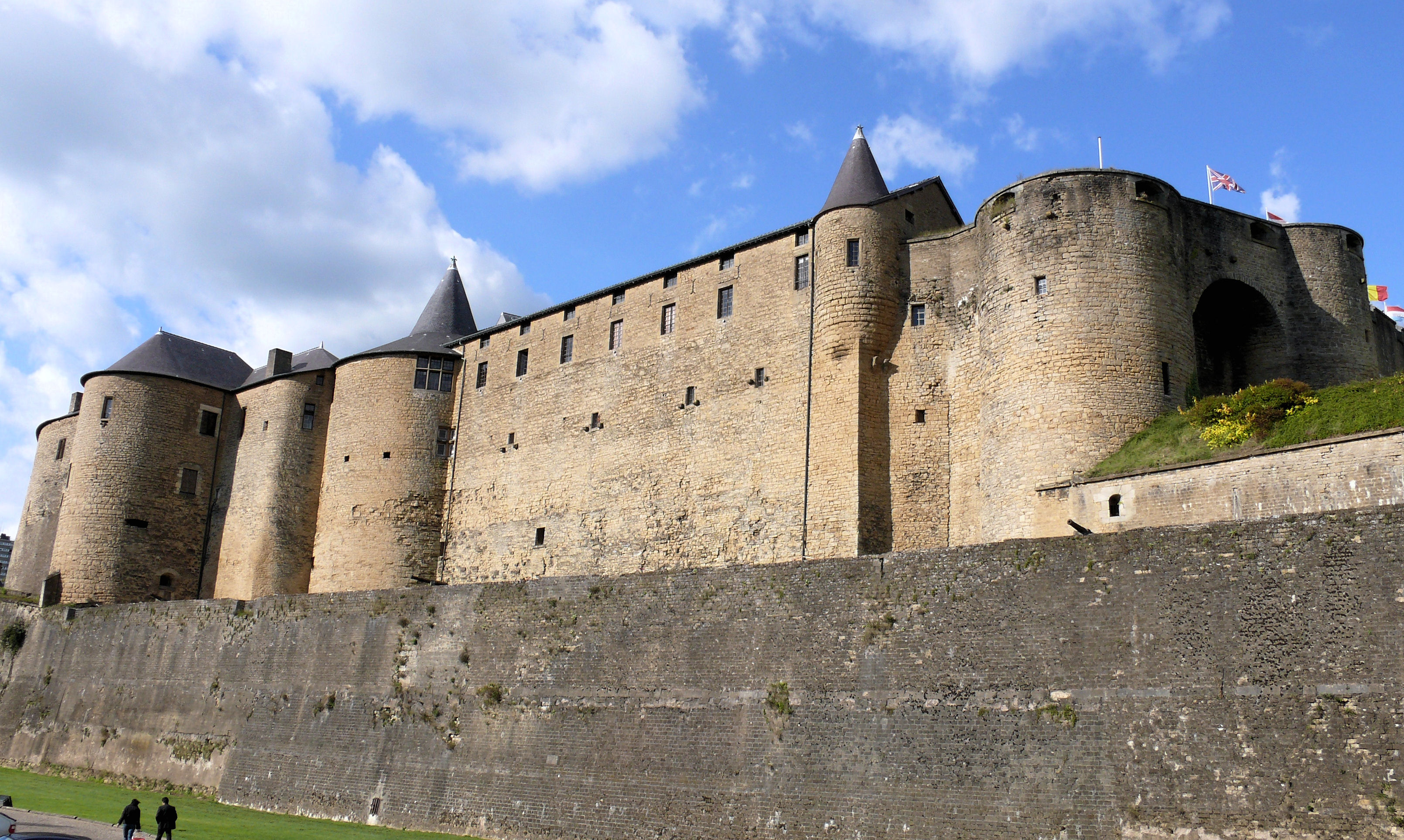
- The Château de Sedan
- Interactive map of the Sedan Castle area
- Alternative names: Sedan Castle Fort

General information
- Location: Cours Clos du Château, 08200 Sedan, France
- Construction started: 1424

Technical details
- Floor count: 7
- Floor area: 35,000 square meters

Website
- https://www.chateau-fort-sedan.fr/en/

Sedan Castle (French: Château de Sedan) is a castle situated in Sedan, France, near the river Meuse. Covering an area of 35,000 square metres (380,000 ft^{2}) in its seven floors.

== History ==
Map of Sedan Castle (1714)

Around 1424, Eberhard II von der Mark built a manor with two towers around a church over a period of six years. When Eberhard died in 1440, his son Jean de la Marck began reinforcing the fortress, but it was Robert II de la Marck, the grandson of Jean, who finished the most important work. In 1530, the fortifications of the manor were modernised by the construction of a circular boulevard and terraces with cannons, thickening the 4.5-metre (15 ft) curtain wall by an additional 26 metres (85 ft). The bastions were added during the course of the next century, but some of them were eventually dynamited at the end of the 19th century. In 1699, the principality having been absorbed into France in 1642 (see the Battle of Marfée, during the Thirty Years' War), and the castle having been transformed into a garrison, Vauban built the door of the Princes (French: « des Princes ») that was adapted to the progress of artillery. In 1822, the Church of Saint-Martin was demolished and replaced with a store for cannonballs.

Turenne was born in the Château de Sedan in 1611.

=== Franco-Prussian War ===
On September 1, 1870, during the Franco-Prussian War, the Army of Chalons was defeated at the Battle of Sedan. Napoleon III surrendered the following day in the small neighboring city of Donchery.

=== World Wars I and II ===
The castle was used as a military hospital by the German army in World War I. Sedan was also the site of a French loss to the Germans in World War II in the Battle of Sedan (1940).

== Current use ==
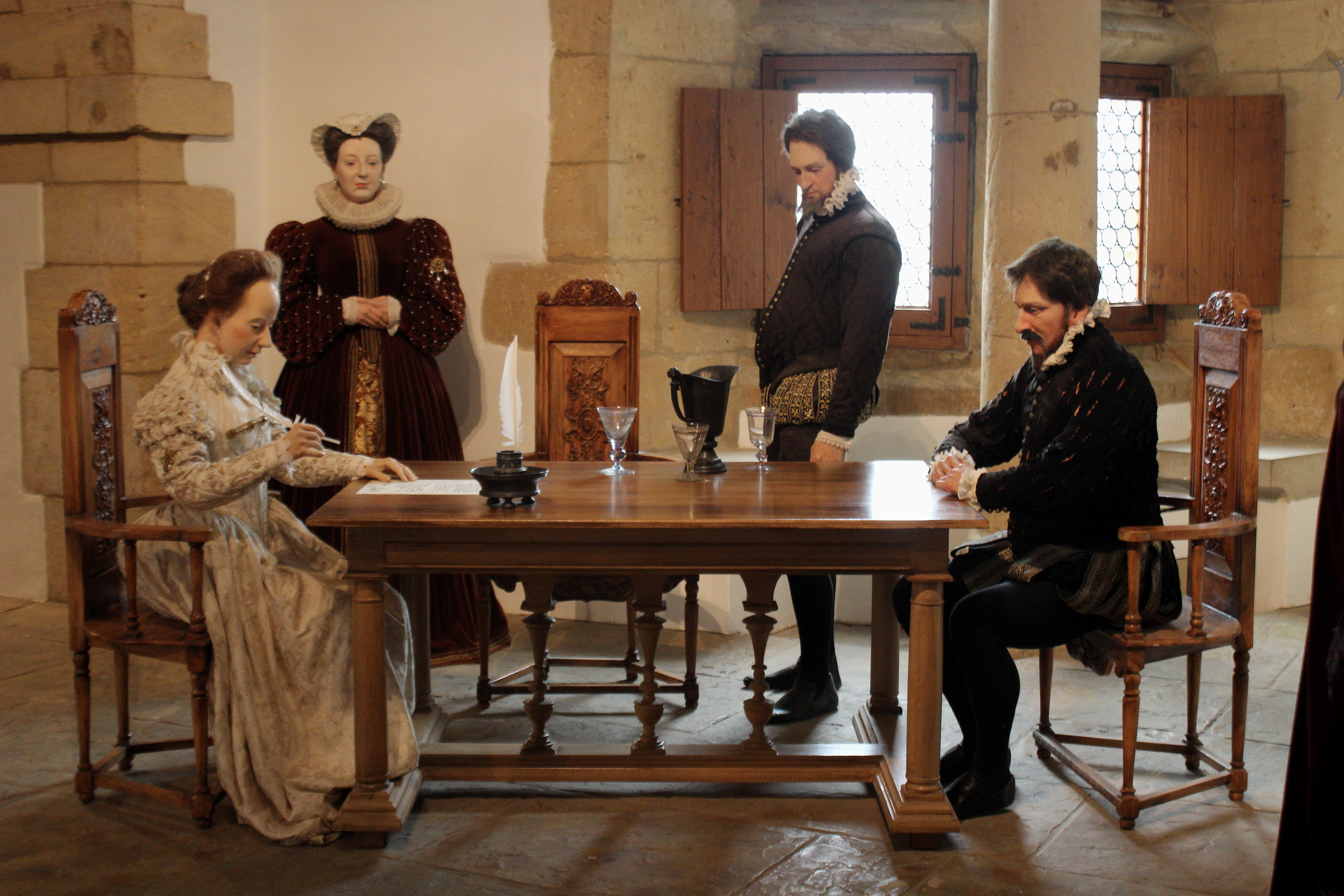
A diorama in the Chateau de Sedan's museum

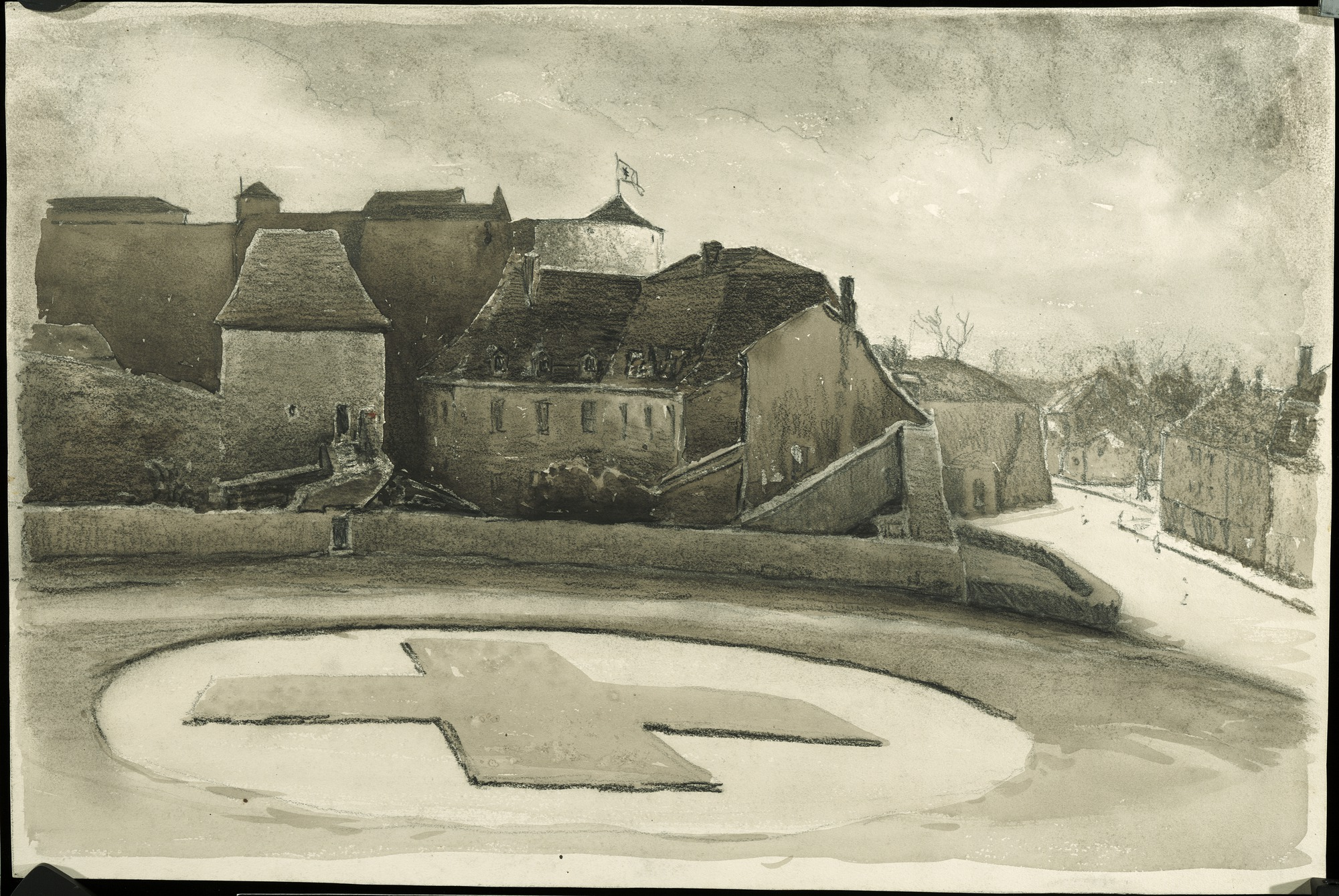
Drawing of the castle in use as German military hospital during World War I

The castle was given by the French Army to the city of Sedan in 1962. Today the castle contains a hotel and a museum showing the lives of inhabitants throughout its history and the Franco-Prussian War.

== See also ==
- List of castles in France
- Principality of Sedan
