= Duchy of Bouillon =

1456–1794 duchy centered around modern Bouillon, Belgium

Duchy of Bouillon Duché de Bouillon
- 1456^{?} – 1794
- Flag Coat of arms

- The Duchy of Bouillon as at 1560, shown within the Lower Rhenish–Westphalian Circle
- Status: State of the Holy Roman Empire; Fief of early modern France
- Capital: Bouillon
- Common languages: Walloon
- Historical era: Middle Ages
  - Ardennes lords of Bouillon: by the 11th century
  - La Marck châtelains: from 1415 the 15th century
  - First style of Duke: 1456
  - Treaties of Nijmegen: 1678
  - Abolition of manorial and feudal rights: 26 May 1790
  - Ducal constitution: 23 March or 1 May 1792
  - Proclamation of the Republic: 24 April 1794
  - Annexed to France: 26 October 1795 (4 Brumaire, Year IV)
Preceded by	Succeeded by
Lower Lorraine	Republic of Bouillon
- Today part of: Belgium

The Duchy of Bouillon (French: Duché de Bouillon) was a duchy comprising Bouillon and adjacent towns and villages in present-day Belgium.

The state originated in the 10th century as property of the Lords of Bouillon, owners of Bouillon Castle. Crusader Godfrey of Bouillon, later the first King of Jerusalem, sold Bouillon to the Prince-Bishopric of Liège in 1095. The Prince-Bishops of Liège consequently became lords of Bouillon and eventually adopted the title of duke. The duchy was later claimed by members of the Houses of La Marck and La Tour d'Auvergne. From 1678, it was a sovereign duchy under French protection and ruled by La Tour. It was annexed by France in 1795. In accordance with the Treaty of Paris of 1815, the sovereignty of the former duchy was attributed to the king of Netherlands as grand duke of Luxemburg, and Bouillon was united to the grand duchy. In 1830, the territory of the former duchy of Bouillon, along with most of the grand duchy, rebelled and joined with Belgium. Bouillon is now a part of Belgium.

== Geography ==
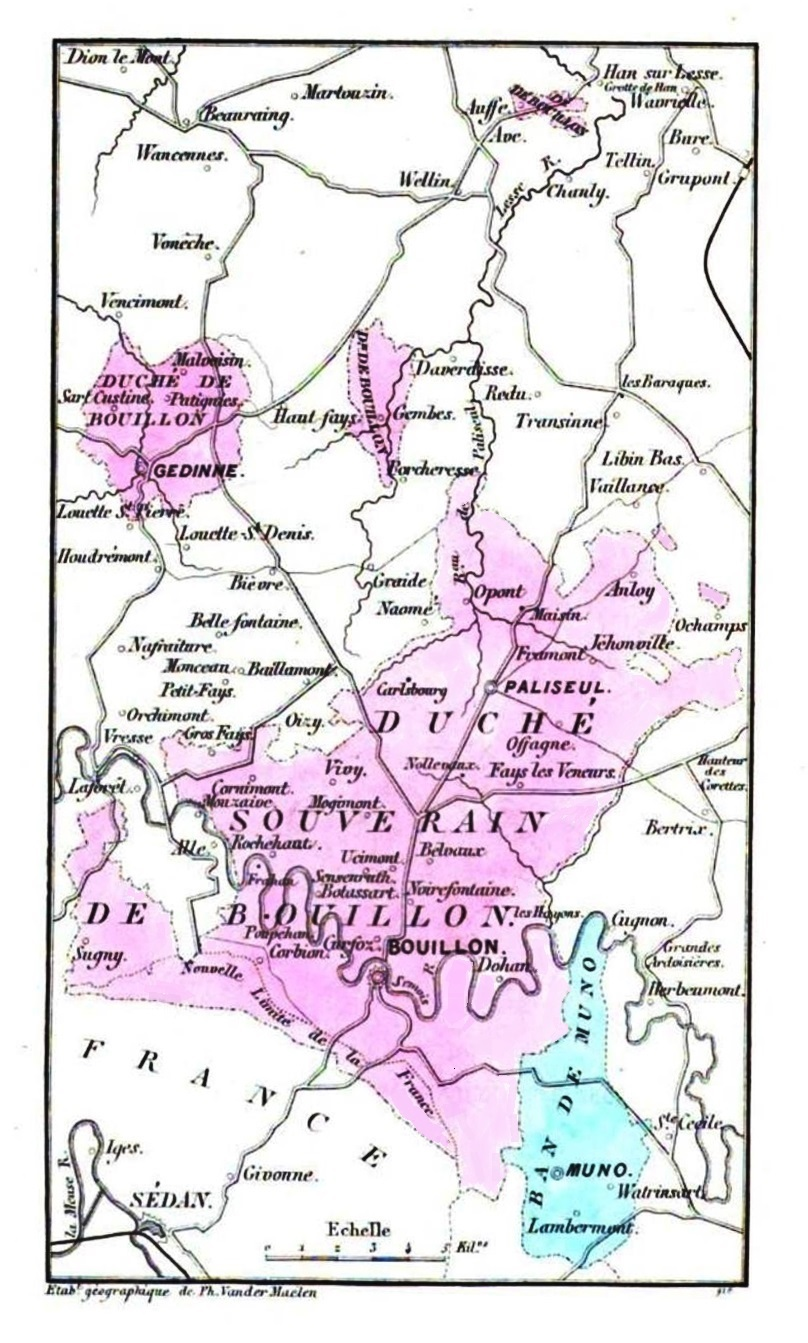
Map of the Duchy

The Duchy of Bouillon was a sovereign duchy until 1795. In 1789, it had a population of 2,500. The largest town was Bouillon, situated on the Semois. It also consisted of the surrounding villages: Sugny, Corbion, Alle, Rochehaut, Ucimont, Botassart, Sensenruth, Noirefontaine, Gros-Fays, Fays-les-Veneurs, Bertrix, Carlsbourg, Paliseul, Jehonville, Opont, Anloy, Porcheresse, Gembes, Gedinne, Sart-Custinne, and Tellin.

Bouillon is located in a Walloon-speaking region.

== History ==
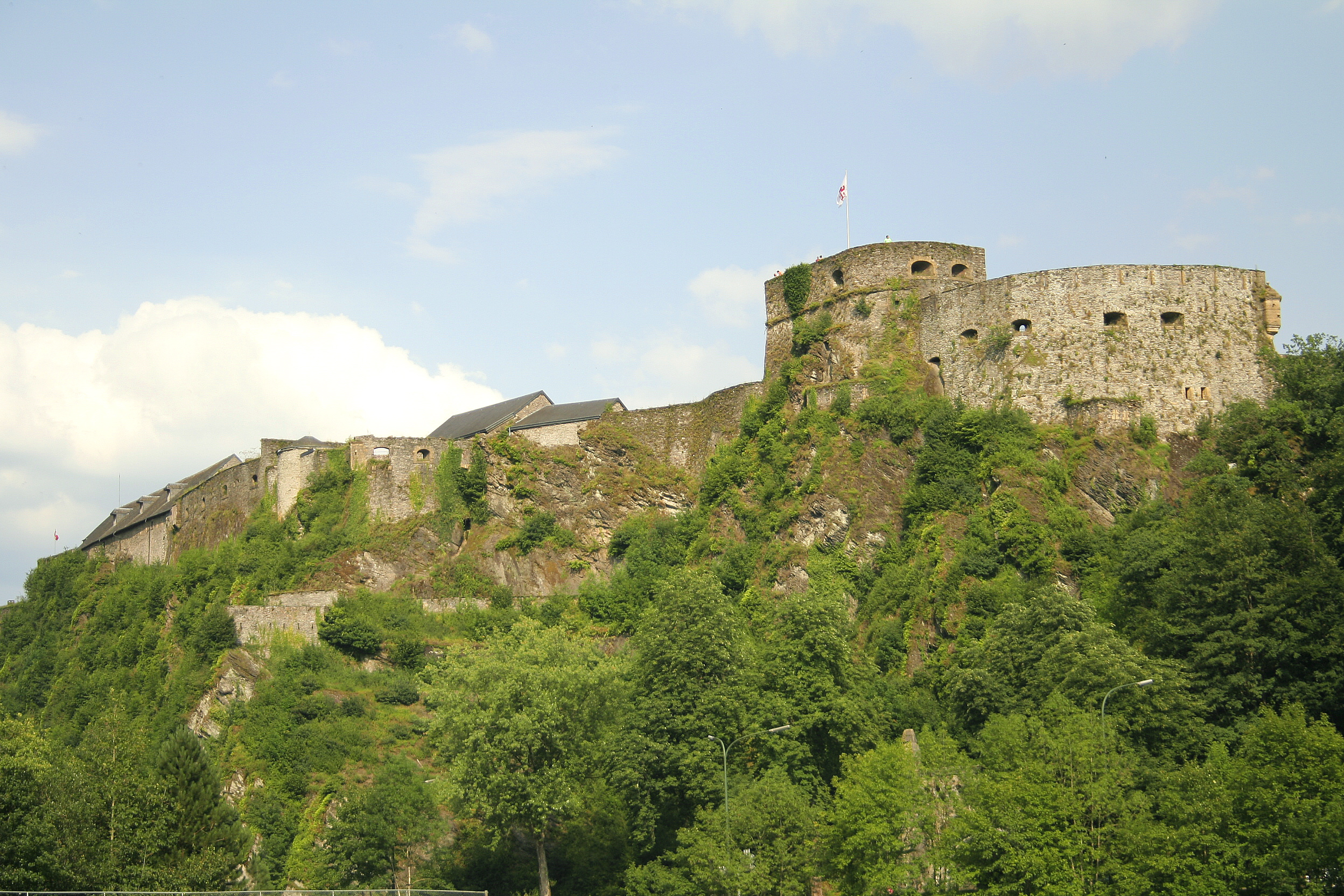
Bouillon Castle

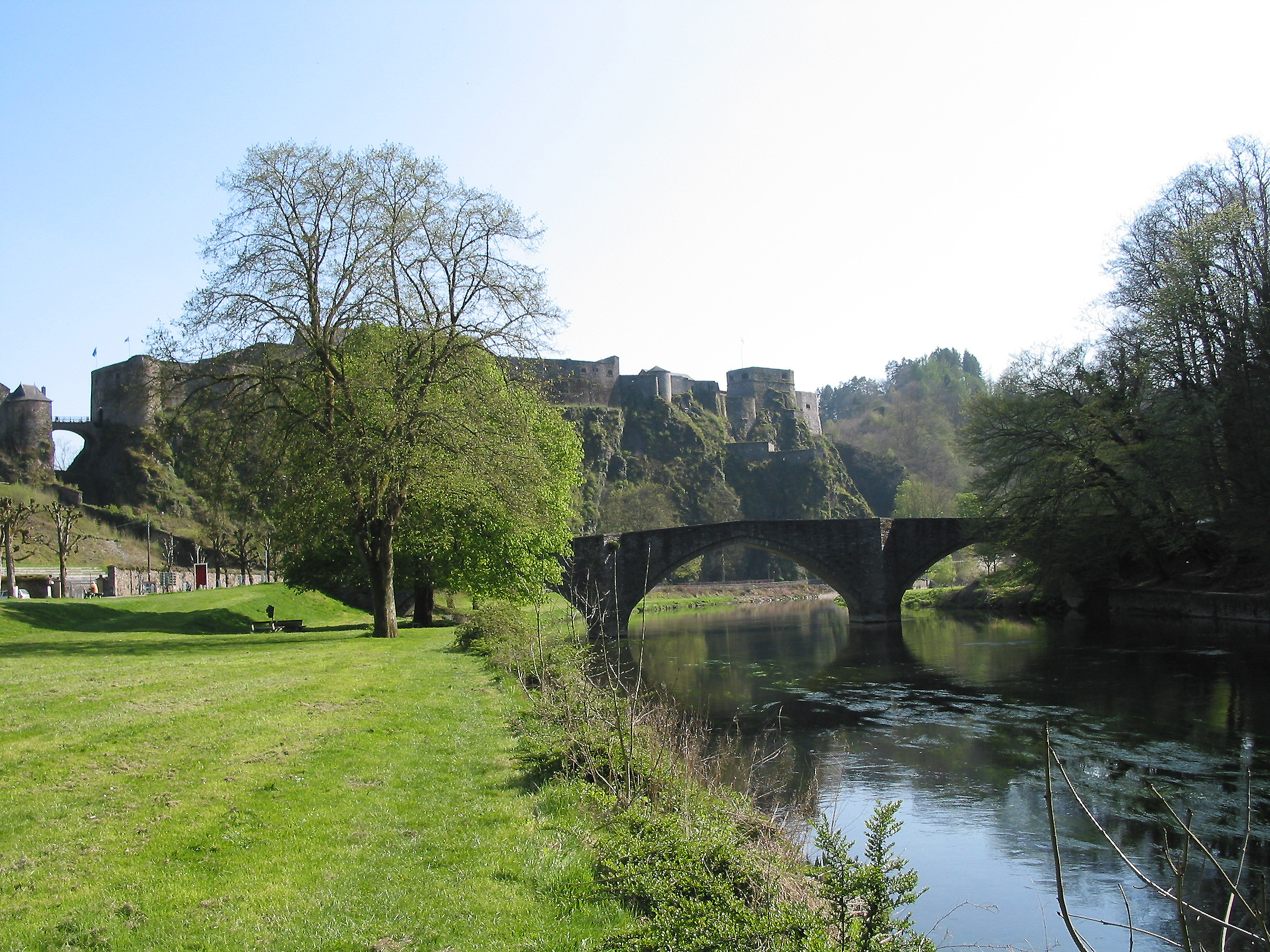
The Semois with Bouillon Castle in the background

History of the Low Countries (schematic)
Frisii		Germanic tribes		Belgae & Celts			
Frisii	Cana– nefates (Note: Roman foederati)	Chamavi, Tubantes (Note: The Chamavi merged into the confederation of the Franks; the Tubantes merged into the confederation of the Saxons.)		Gallia Belgica (55 BC–c. 5th century AD); Germania Inferior (83–c. 5th century)			
Frisii	Cana– nefates	Salian Franks		Batavi			
unpopulated (4th –c. 5th centuries)		Saxons	Salian Franks (4th–c. 5th centuries)				
Frisian Kingdom (c. 6th century – 734)		Saxons	Frankish Kingdom (481–843)—Carolingian Empire (800–843)				
Frisian Kingdom (c. 6th century – 734)		Austrasia (511–687)					
Middle Francia (843–855)				West; Francia (from 843)	Middle Francia (843–855)		
Kingdom of Lotharingia (Note: Part of East Francia after 939, divided in Upper Lorraine (as part of West Francia) and Lower Lorraine (as part of East Francia) in 959.) (855–959); Duchy of Lower Lorraine (Note: Lower Lorraine—also referred to as Lothier—disintegrated into several smaller independent territories and only the title of a "Duke of Lothier" remained, held by Brabant.) (from 959)			Kingdom of Lotharingia (855–959); Duchy of Lower Lorraine (from 959)	West; Francia (from 843)	Kingdom of Lotharingia (855–959); Duchy of Lower Lorraine (from 959)		
Frisia			Kingdom of Lotharingia (855–959); Duchy of Lower Lorraine (from 959)	County of Flanders (Note: Including County of Artois (part of Flanders until 1237) and Tournaisis.) (862–1384)	Kingdom of Lotharingia (855–959); Duchy of Lower Lorraine (from 959)		
Frisian; Freedom (Note: Lordship of Frisia and Lordship of Groningen (including the Ommelanden) after 1524 and 1536 respectively.) (11th–16th centuries)	County of Holland (Note: Including County of Zeeland, that was ruled by neighboring County of Holland and County of Flanders (until 1432).) (880–1432)	Bishopric of Utrecht (Note: Utrecht included Lordship of Overijssel (until 1528), County of Drenthe (until 1528) and County of Zutphen (until 1182).) (695–1456)	Duchy of Brabant (Note: Duchy of Brabant included since 1288 also the Duchy of Limburg (now part of Belgium's Liège Province) and the "Overmaas" lands Dalhem, Valkenburg and Herzogenrath (now part of the Dutch Province of Limburg).) (1183–1430) Duchy of Guelders (Note: The county, later duchy, of Guelders consisted of four quarters, as they were separated by rivers: situated upstream Upper Quarter (the present day northern half of the Dutch province of Limburg), spatially separated from the three downstream Lower Quarters: County of Zutphen (after 1182), Veluwe Quarter and Nijmegen Quarter. The three lower quarters emerged from the historic gau Hamaland (named after the Chamavi tribe), and formed the present day province of Gelderland. Guelders did not include the Cleves enclave Huissen and the independent counties of Buren and Culemborg, that were much later seceded to the province of Gelderland.) (1046–1543)	County of Flanders (862–1384)	County of Hainaut (1071–1432) County of Namur (981–1421)	Prince- Bishopric of Liège (Note: Throughout the Middle Ages, the bishopric was further expanded with the Duchy of Bouillon in 1096 (ceded to France in 1678), the acquisition of the county of Loon in 1366 and the county of Horne in 1568. The Lordship of Mechelen was also part of the Prince-Bishopric of Liège.)(980–1791)	Duchy of Luxembourg (1059–1443)
Frisian; Freedom (11th–16th centuries)	Burgundian Netherlands (1384–1482)					Prince- Bishopric of Liège (980–1791)	Burgundian Netherlands (1384–1482)
Habsburg Netherlands (1482–1795) (Seventeen Provinces after 1543) (Note: The name Seventeen Provinces came in use after the Habsburg emperor Charles V had re-acquired the Duchy of Guelders, and an continuous territory arose.)						Prince- Bishopric of Liège (980–1791)	Habsburg Netherlands (1482–1795) (Seventeen Provinces after 1543)
Dutch Republic (1581–1795)				Spanish Netherlands (1556–1714)		Prince- Bishopric of Liège (980–1791)	Spanish Netherlands (1556–1714)
Dutch Republic (1581–1795)				Austrian Netherlands (1714–1795)		Prince- Bishopric of Liège (980–1791)	Austrian Netherlands (1714–1795)
Dutch Republic (1581–1795)				United States of Belgium (1790)		Republic of Liège (1789–'91)	United States of Belgium (1790)
Dutch Republic (1581–1795)				Austrian Netherlands (1795–1797)		P.-Bish. of Liège (1791–1794)	Austrian Netherlands (1795–1797)
Batavian Republic (1795–1806); Kingdom of Holland (1806–1810)			associated with French First Republic (1795–1804) part of First French Empire (1804–1815)				
part of First French Empire (1810–1813)			associated with French First Republic (1795–1804) part of First French Empire (1804–1815)				
Sovereign Principality of the Netherlands (1813–1815)			associated with French First Republic (1795–1804) part of First French Empire (1804–1815)				
United Kingdom of the Netherlands (1815–1830)							Grand Duchy of Luxembourg (from 1815)
Kingdom of the Netherlands (from 1839)				Kingdom of Belgium (from 1830)			Grand Duchy of Luxembourg (from 1815)
Kingdom of the Netherlands (from 1839)				Kingdom of Belgium (from 1830)			Grand Duchy of Luxembourg (from 1890)

The Duchy of Bouillon's origins are unclear. The first reference to Bouillon Castle comes in 988 and by the 11th century, Bouillon was a freehold held by the House of Ardennes, who styled themselves Lords of Bouillon. On the death of Godfrey III, Duke of Lower Lorraine in 1069, Bouillon passed to his nephew, Godfrey of Bouillon. In 1095, Godfrey of Bouillon sold Bouillon to Otbert, the Prince-Bishop of Liège, in order to finance his participation in the First Crusade. Godfrey later became first ruler of the Kingdom of Jerusalem.

The Prince-Bishop of Liège granted the châtellenie of Bouillon to the House of La Marck in 1415. In 1456, Louis de Bourbon, Bishop of Liège became the first individual to style himself "Duke of Bouillon". In 1482, the then Châtelain of Bouillon, William de La Marck, ordered the assassination of Louis in a plot to install his son, Jean de la Marck, as Prince-Bishop. This plot proved unsuccessful: John of Hornes was elected as successor of Louis de Bourbon as Prince-Bishop of Liège. John then fought a war with William that ended with the Treaty of Tongeren, signed May 21, 1484, with the de la Marck family relinquishing its claim on Liège, though they retained Bouillon Castle as a pledge for a loan of 30,000 livres and for their support for the Prince-Bishop against the emperor Maximilian I. In 1492 Robert II de la Marck began calling himself "Duke of Bouillon", but in 1521, Érard de La Marck, Prince-Bishop of Liège (and Robert's brother), with the backing of the troops of Charles V, Holy Roman Emperor, managed to regain Bouillon for the Prince-Bishopric.

On becoming chatelain in 1536 Robert Fleuranges III de La Marck also styled himself "Duke of Bouillon" and his successor Robert IV maintained the right to this title. During the Italian War of 1551–1559, Bouillon was occupied by the forces of Henry II of France to keep them free from Habsburg influence, but Henry confirmed Robert IV as Duke of Bouillon.

From 1560 to 1642, the Dukes of Bouillon were also the rulers of the independent Principality of Sedan.

With the death of Charlotte de La Marck in 1594, the duchy and the title passed to her husband Henri de La Tour d'Auvergne and thereafter became the possession of the House of La Tour d'Auvergne. France again invaded Bouillon in 1676 during the Franco-Dutch War, but Godefroy Maurice de La Tour d'Auvergne retained the title. From this point on, although the Duchy of Bouillon was officially still a part of the Holy Roman Empire, it was in actuality a French protectorate. This state of affairs was confirmed by the 1678 Treaties of Nijmegen.

In the wake of the French Revolution, the French Revolutionary Army invaded the Duchy of Bouillon in 1794, creating the short-lived Republic of Bouillon. In 1795, Bouillon was annexed to France. The last duke, Jacques Léopold de La Tour d'Auvergne, died in 1802 without any children (which was the extinction of the La Tour d'Auvergne family).

In 1815 the Congress of Vienna established an arbitral commission to determine the "Duke of Bouillon" and decided in favor of Charles Alain Gabriel de Rohan (the last duke's closest relative on his paternal side) over Philippe d'Auvergne (a postulated relative, who had been adopted and declared an heir by Jacques' father, Godefroy de La Tour d'Auvergne, when he was the duke). Meanwhile the Duchy of Bouillon was annexed to the Grand Duchy of Luxembourg, then in personal union with the Kingdom of the Netherlands (later becoming part of the Kingdom of the Belgians in 1830). The title, territory and the debt of Bouillon remained a bone of contention between the bishopric and the noble houses before and after the French annexation of Bouillon in 1795. Court rulings about claimants were not resolved until 1825.

== List of dukes of Bouillon ==
=== Prince bishops of Liege 1456–? ===
Picture	Name	Father	Birth	Marriage	Became duke	Death	Spouse
	Louis de Bourbon	Charles I, Duke of Bourbon	1438	unmarried	1456 claimed title on accession to bishopric	30 August 1482	none
	John of Hornes	James of Hornes	around 1450	unmarried	1484 (accession) maintained ownership of Bouillon	1505	none
	Érard de La Marck	Robert I de la Marck	31 May 1472	unmarried	1505 (accession) maintained ownership of Bouillon	1538	none

=== House of La Marck, ?–1588 ===
Picture	Name	Father	Birth	Marriage	Became duke	Death	Spouse
	Robert I de La Marck	Jean de La Marck	1430	15 June 1446	appointed chatelaine of Bouillon	February 1487	Jeanne de Marley
	Robert II de la Marck	Robert I	1465	25 December 1490	claimed title of Duke, 1492	March 1536	Catherine de Croÿ
	Robert Fleuranges de La Marck	Robert II	1491	1 April 1510	claimed title of Duke, 1536	21 December 1537	Guillemette of Saarbrücken, Countess of Braine
	Robert IV de La Marck	Robert Fleuranges	5 January 1512	1 March 1539	confirmed in title by Henry II of France	15 February 1556	Françoise de Brézé, Countess of Maulevrier
	Henri-Robert de La Marck	Robert IV	7 February 1540	7 Feb 1558	15 February 1556 father's death	2 December 1574	Françoise de Bourbon
	Charlotte de La Marck suo jure	Henri Robert	5 November 1574	19 May 1594	2 December 1574 father's death	15 May 1594	Henri de La Tour d'Auvergne
Picture	Name	Father	Birth	Marriage	Became duke	Death	Spouse

=== House of La Tour d'Auvergne, 1588–1802 ===
Picture	Name	Father	Birth	Marriage	Became duke	Ceased to be duke	Death	Spouse
	Henri de La Tour d'Auvergne	François de La Tour d'Auvergne	28 September 1555	19 November 1591	15 May 1594 first wife's death	25 March 1623		Charlotte de La Marck
	Henri de La Tour d'Auvergne	François de La Tour d'Auvergne	28 September 1555	15 April 1595	15 May 1594 first wife's death	25 March 1623		Elisabeth of Nassau
	Frédéric Maurice de La Tour d'Auvergne	Henri	22 October 1605	2 January 1634	25 March 1623 father's death	9 August 1652		Eleonora Catharina Febronis van den Bergh
	Godefroy Maurice de La Tour d'Auvergne	Frédéric Maurice	21 June 1636	19 April 1662	9 August 1652 father's death	26 July 1721		Marie Anne Mancini
	Emmanuel Théodose de La Tour d'Auvergne	Godefroy Maurice	1668	1 February 1696	26 July 1721 father's death	17 April 1730		Marie Armande Victoire de La Trémoille
	Emmanuel Théodose de La Tour d'Auvergne	Godefroy Maurice	1668	4 January 1718	26 July 1721 father's death	17 April 1730		Louise Françoise Angélique Le Tellier
	Emmanuel Théodose de La Tour d'Auvergne	Godefroy Maurice	1668	21 March 1725	26 July 1721 father's death	17 April 1730		Louise Henriette Françoise de Lorraine
	Charles Godefroy de La Tour d'Auvergne	Emmanuel Théodose	16 July 1706	2 April 1724	17 April 1730 father's death	24 October 1771		Maria Karolina Sobieska
	Godefroy de La Tour d'Auvergne	Charles Godefroy	26 January 1728	27 November 1743	24 October 1771 father's death	3 December 1792		Louise de Lorraine
	Godefroy de La Tour d'Auvergne	Charles Godefroy	26 January 1728	14 May 1789	24 October 1771 father's death	3 December 1792		Marie Françoise Henriette de Banastre
	Jacques Léopold de La Tour d'Auvergne	Godefroy	15 January 1746	17 July 1766	3 December 1792 father's death	1794; Bouillon absorbed into the French First Republic	7 February 1802	Hedwig of Hesse-Rotenburg
Picture	Name	Father	Birth	Marriage	Became duke	Ceased to be duke	Death	Spouse

=== House of Rohan, 1816–1975 ===
In 1816, the Congress of Vienna restored the title of "Duke of Bouillon", giving it to Charles Alain Gabriel de Rohan, grandson of Marie Louise de La Tour d'Auvergne, who was the daughter of the former duke Charles Godefroy de La Tour d'Auvergne. In 1918 Austria became a republic so the ducal titles ceased to exist for the republican government. See also Duke of Montbazon (since 1816 the two ducal titles are united under one titular) and Albert Rohan, famous Austrian diplomat and de jure Duke between 1976 and 2019.

Picture	Name	Father	Birth	Marriage	Became duke	Death	Wife
	Charles Alain Gabriel (Note: Also Prince of Rohan.) (Note: Also Prince of Guéméné.) (Note: Also Duke of Montbazon.)	Henri Louis, Prince of Guéméné (Rohan)	18 January 1764	29 May 1781	1816 accession	24 April 1836	Louise Aglaé de Conflans d'Armentières
	Louis Victor Mériadec (Note: Also Count of Saint-Pol)	Henri Louis, Prince of Guéméné (Rohan)	1766		24 April 1836 accession	1841	Berthe de Rohan
	Camille Philippe Joseph Idesbald	Charles-Louis-Gaspard de Rohan-Rochefort; Adopted by Louis Victor Mériadec	19 December 1801	28 May 1826	1846 accession	13 September 1892	Adelheid zu Löwenstein-Wertheim-Rosenberg
	Alain Benjamin Arthur (Note: Also Prince of Rochefort.) (Note: Also Prince of Montaubon.)	Arthur de Rohan (1826–1885), nephew of Camille Philippe	8 January 1853	10 October 1885	13 September 1892 accession	24 February 1914	Johanna of Auersperg
	Alain Anton Joseph Adolf Ignaz Maria	Alain Benjamin Arthur	26 Jul 1893	29 September 1921	24 February 1914	17 March 1975	Margarethe von Schönburg-Hartenstein
Picture	Name	Father	Birth	Marriage	Became duke	Death	Wife

== Bibliography ==
- Jacques Marsollier (1647-1724): Histoire du maréchal duc de Bouillon; où l'on trouve ce qui s'est passé de plus remarquable sous les règnes de François II, Charles IX, Henry III, Henry IV, la minorité & les premières années du règne de Louis XIII
  - Vol I (1726), online
  - Vol II (1726), online
  - Vol III (1726), online

== See also ==
- Duchess of Bouillon
- Prince of Sedan
