= Eberhard II von der Mark =

Eberhard II von der Mark (1365–1454) (Fr.: Évrard de La Marck) was Lord of Arenberg. He began styling himself Lord of Sedan in 1424.

== Biography ==
Eberhard II von der Mark was born in Aremberg in 1365, the son of Eberhard I von der Mark and grandson of Engelbert II, Count of the Mark, ruler of the County of Mark and the Count of Aremberg through marriage to his grandmother, Mechtilde of Arenberg. His mother was Marie de Looz, granddaughter of Jean de Looz. He was married in 1410 to Marie de Braquemont (died 1425), sister of Louis de Braquemont, and daughter of Guillaume Dit Braquet de Braquemont and Marie de Campremy.

After purchasing the area around modern Sedan, Ardennes from his brother-in-law Louis de Braquemont, in 1424, he expelled the monks of the Benedictine Abbey of Mouzon and began construction on the Château de Sedan. He began styling himself Lord of Sed.

He died in 1454 and was succeeded by his eldest son Johann von der Marck-Arenberg (1410-1480).

From his second marriage to Agnès Dit de Walcourt de Rochefort, he had a son named Louis (1425-1498). Louis married Nicole d'Aspremont and started the cadet house of House of La Marck-Rochefort who went on to be Lords of Agimont, Neufchâteau and Orchimont, Counts of Rochefort and Montaigu.

His illegitimate son, Godfrey (1410-1465), married Marie de Montjardin and started the cadet house of House of La Marck-Sprimont who were Lords of Sprimont, Amblève, Bomal and Hamal.
