= Henri-Robert de La Marck =

- Duc de Bouillon
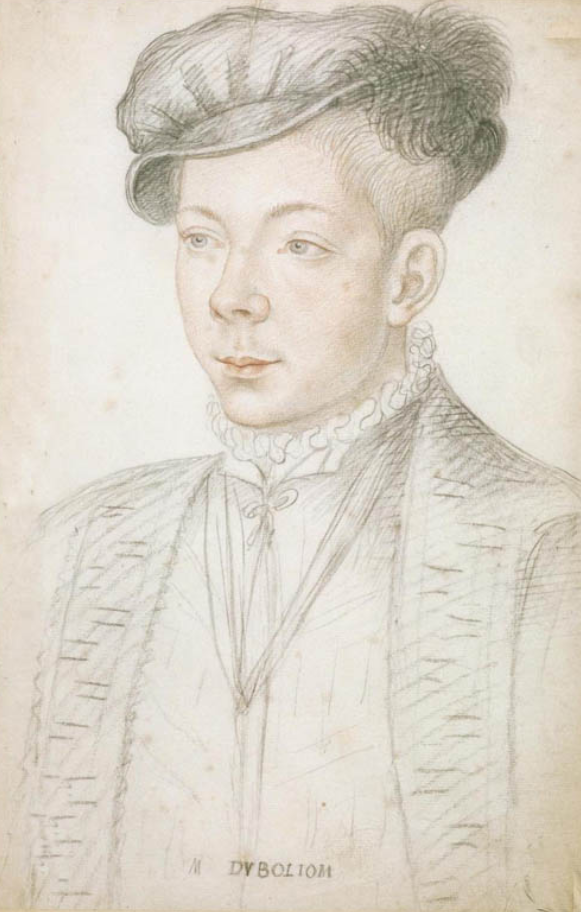
- Portrait of the Duke of Bouillon
- Other titles: Governor of Normandy; Prince of Sedan
- Born: 1539; Kingdom of France
- Died: 2 December 1574 (aged 34–35); Kingdom of France
- Family: House of La Marck
- Spouse: Françoise de Bourbon
- Issue: Guillaume-Robert de La Marck; Charlotte de La Marck
- Father: Robert IV de La Marck
- Mother: Françoise de Brézé

Henri-Robert de La Marck (c. 1539–2 December 1574) was a French noble, sovereign prince and governor of Normandy. Ascending to the high office of governor of Normandy on the death of his father shortly after his return from captivity, Bouillon found himself in financial trouble, ruined by the debt from his father’s ransom. With the death of Henri II in 1559 and the disgrace of his patron Diane de Poitiers Bouillon found his position in Normandy tenuous. Bouillon converted to Protestantism in 1561, as much of the Norman nobility had in the prior years, Bouillon however had little interest in leading them.

When civil war broke out in 1562, Bouillon did not join Condé and his co-religionists in their rebellion, instead following a path of neutrality. When Aumale was granted a special commission to subdue the Protestants of Normandy, Bouillon took up arms against him without joining the Protestant forces of Rouen, creating a third side to the conflict in the province. Subsequently, he was deprived of his office as governor of Normandy, until by the successful campaign of Aumale and Montpensier it was restored to him in June 1564. Later that month he attempted to assert his authority in Rouen however his decrees were reversed by the crown, and feeling powerless he withdrew to his power base in the Ardenne.

In 1566 he found himself involved with the Protestants of the Spanish Netherlands hoping to get them to rise against Spain. In 1572 he was in Paris when the Massacre of Saint Bartholomew unfolded, and avoided being murdered through a promise of conversion to Catholicism. The following year he had reversed on this and was suspected of involvement with the Malcontents before he died in late 1574.

== Early life and family ==
Henri-Robert de La Marck was the son of Robert IV de La Marck and Françoise de Brézé daughter of Diane de Poitiers. His father and grandmother were favourites of king Henri II and as such his family found itself in receipt of high privileges.

Henri-Robert married Françoise de Bourbon, the daughter of the duke of Montpensier.

== Reign of Henry II ==
In 1556 upon the death of his father, he was granted the title of governor of Normandy by the king. He found himself immediately in financial difficulty, and over the following years would have to sell many of the fiefs that comprised the Brézé inheritance to the Guise, consolidating their position in Normandy. In 1562 they purchased the county of Maulévrier from him.

In 1558 Bouillon entered his governorship for the first time, heading to Dieppe with the goal of reorganising its defences to protect it against English or Spanish attacks.

In the Peace of Cateau-Cambrésis that brought an end to the Italian Wars the next year, Bouillon was divested of parts of his lands, including the duchy of Bouillon which was returned to the bishop of Liège. Theoretically he was to be compensated for these losses by the crown, however no payment or alternate lands were offered to him.

== Reign of Francis II ==
The death of Henri II and the disgrace of Diane de Poitiers put Bouillon's position greatly at risk. His mother Françoise, daughter of Diane found herself banished from court, and the crown considered removing Bouillon's governorship from him.

== Reign of Charles IX ==
=== Return to Normandy ===
Having only visited his governorship once since he was appointed to the role in 1556 he found his position there weak on his return in 1561. An outsider to Normandy he lacked much in the way of family connections in the region, most of his ties being in the Ardenne, his family had also risen in large part due to the patronage of the now disgraced Diane de Poitiers. In the same year he converted to Protestantism, complicating his relationship with the house of Guise to whom he had sold much of his inheritance. Despite his Protestantism he was little interested in taking up leadership of the local Protestant community, and thus that role fell to lesser nobles in the territory such as Montgommery.

=== Protestant ascendency ===
His conversion to Protestantism did not however win him the esteem of Gaspard II de Coligny who during his ascendency at court in late 1561 considered the removal of Bouillon from his governorship, this time for his relations with the Guise family instead of Diane de Poitiers. His proximity to the family would however ultimately save him as Coligny felt unable to move that severely against the Guise.

Despite lacking the desire to lead the Protestants of Normandy, he tolerated their assemblies, instructing his magistrates and baillis not to interfere with them. When a Catholic notable of Bourges was found in Rouen possessing a list of the towns leading Huguenots and their assets, Bouillon was granted a special commission to conduct the notables trial, and oversaw his execution.

=== First civil war ===
When civil war broke out in 1562, Bouillon was ill inclined to join Condé's rebellion, and remained neutral, holding up in Caen. The Huguenots of the region came to him with a remonstrance, explaining their uprising as a defensive measure against an imminent Catholic attack. As many of the towns of Normandy began falling to the Protestants, Bouillon appeared before the gates of Rouen which had been seized in a coup, attempting to talk the leaders of the town down, however he achieved no success in this. Aumale was dispatched to bring Normandy back into obedience to the crown on 5 May 1562. Aumale was Bouillon's uncle, and it was hoped that he would be a choice of military leader that Bouillon could tolerate. Bouillon was however furious at this usurpation of his authority, and besieged Aumale's deputy Matignon in Cherbourg.

Having been removed from the office of governor of Normandy, Aumale and Montpensier, two of the courts ultra-Catholics successfully campaigned for him to be reinstated to the office in June.

=== Loss of power ===
Reinstated to his office, Bouillon again visited his troublesome governorship, his arrival in Rouen created uproar among militant Catholics as he sought justice for a murder of a Protestant judge that had occurred the year prior, arresting several suspects, and further ordered that Protestants who had been denied their office in the wake of the siege of Rouen be restored to their former status in the city. The council of 24 protested his measures strongly to the court, and eventually much of what he had tried to enforce in the town was overturned, and Bouillon retired from his governorship back to the confines of Sedan where his orders would not be overturned. While he continued to be governor of Normandy, real power lay with the lieutenant-generals of the province after his departure.

In late 1566, Bouillon was among those Protestant nobles, including Porcien who were conspiring against Spain in the Netherlands.

=== St Bartholomew's Day Massacre ===
In 1572 Bouillon arrived in Paris for the wedding of Navarre and Margaret of Valois. As the Massacre of Saint Bartholomew unfolded in the days after, Bouillon saved his life by promising to convert to Catholicism, and urging those he was hiding with to do likewise.

His Principality of Sedan became a base for Protestant malcontents, and during the Politique conspiracy that consumed France in early 1574 a large number of Huguenot nobles rendezvoused in the state. Emissaries were sent out from the court to Sedan, France to urge Bouillon and Condé not to conspire with Louis of Nassau. On 2 December 1574 Bouillon died.

== Sources ==
- Baumgartner, Frederic (1988). Henry II: King of france 1547-1559. Duke University Press.
- Benedict, Phillip (2003). Rouen during the Wars of Religion. Cambridge University Press.
- Carroll, Stuart (1998). Noble Power during the French Wars of Religion: The Guise Affinity and the Catholic Cause in Normandy. Cambridge University Press.
- Daussy, Hugues (2002). Les huguenots et le roi le combat politique de Philippe Duplessis-Mornay, 1572-1600. Droz. ISBN 9782600006675.
- Diefendorf, Barbara (1991). Beneath the Cross: Catholics and Huguenots in Sixteenth Century Paris. Oxford University Press.
- Harding, Robert (1978). Anatomy of a Power Elite: the Provincial Governors in Early Modern France. Yale University Press.
- Konnert, Mark W. (2017). Local Politics in the French Wars of Religion: The Towns of Champagne, the Duc de Guise, and the Catholic League, 1560–95. Routledge. ISBN 9781351921596.
- Potter, David, ed. (2004). Foreign Intelligence and Information in Elizabethan England. Vol. 25: Two English Treatises on the State of France, 1580–1584. Cambridge University Press.
- Thompson, James (1909). The Wars of Religion in France 1559-1576: The Huguenots, Catherine de Medici and Philip II. Chicago University Press.
