= Henri de La Tour d'Auvergne, Duke of Bouillon =

Marshal of France

Marshal Henri de La Tour d'Auvergne duc de Bouillon
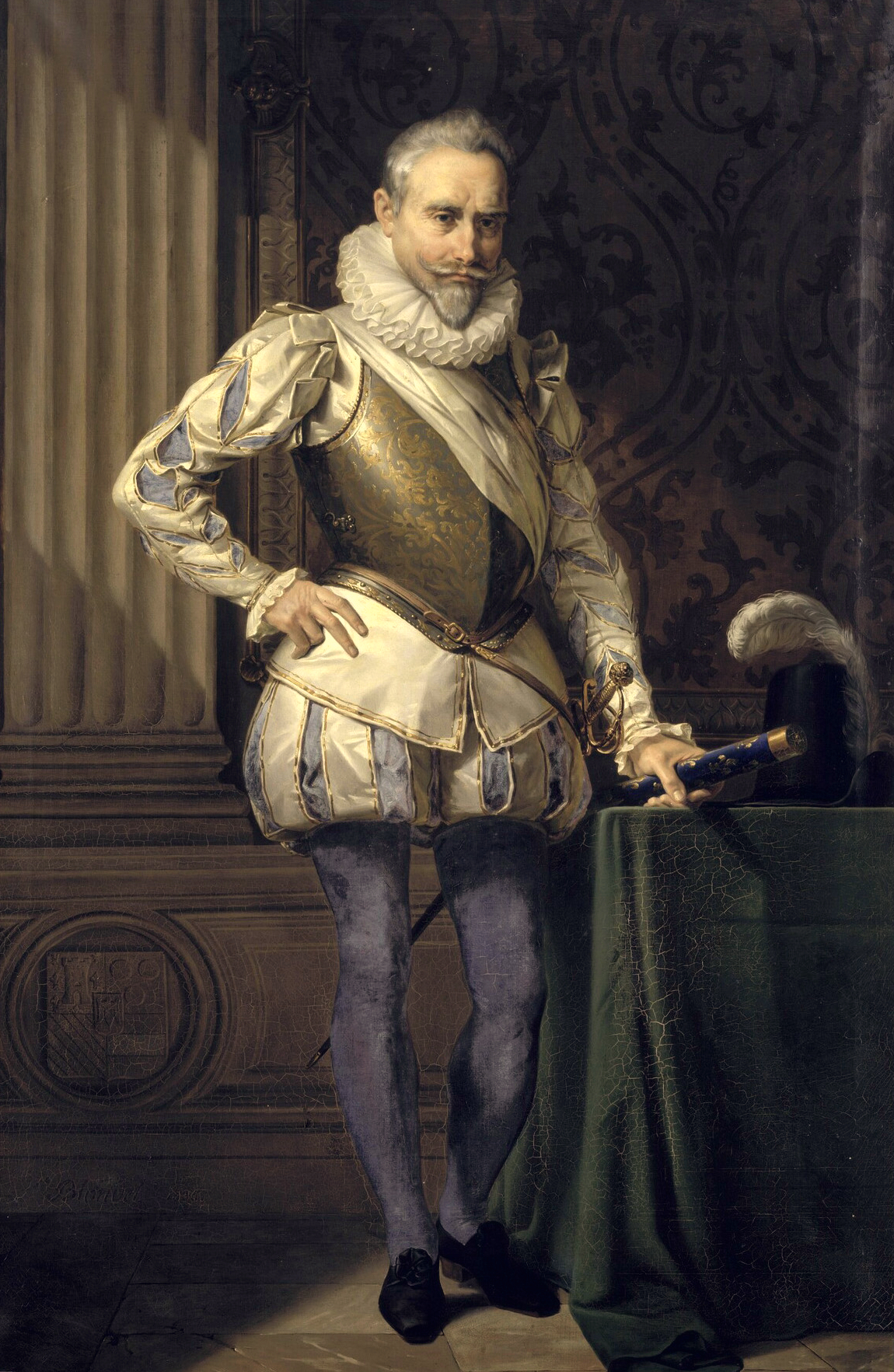
- Posthumous Portrait by Merry-Joseph Blondel
- Born: 28 September 1555; Château de Joze-en-Auvergne, France
- Died: 25 March 1623 (aged 67); Sedan, France
- Title: duc de Bouillon (jure uxoris), comte de Montfort et Nègrepelisse, vicomte de Turenne, Castillon, et Lanquais
- Spouse(s): Charlotte de La Marck; Elisabeth of Orange-Nassau
- Children: Marie, Duchess of La Trémoille; Juliane Catherine, Countess of Roucy; Frédéric Maurice de La Tour d'Auvergne; Élisabeth, Marquise of Duras; Henriette Catherine, Marquise of La Moussaye; Henri, vicomte de Turenne
- Parents: François de La Tour d'Auvergne (father); Éléonore de Montmorency (mother)
- Family: La Tour d'Auvergne

Henri de La Tour d'Auvergne (28 September 1555 – 25 March 1623), duc de Bouillon (jure uxoris), was a member of the powerful House of La Tour d'Auvergne, the Prince of Sedan and a marshal of France. He was a prominent Huguenot figure.

== Biography ==
Henri de La Tour d'Auvergne was born at the castle of Joze-en-Auvergne, near Clermont-Ferrand in Auvergne. His parents were François de La Tour d'Auvergne, Viscount of Turenne and Éléonore de Montmorency, eldest daughter of Anne, 1st Duc de Montmorency.

After the St. Bartholomew's Day Massacre in 1572 he participated in the siege of La Rochelle, but subsequently re-converted to Protestantism. Compromised in the conspiracy of La Mole and Coconnat in 1574, he joined the party of the Malcontents headed by François, Duke of Alençon (younger brother of kings Charles IX and Henry III) in 1575.

In 1576 he joined the Protestant party of Henry of Navarre (the future Henry IV), negotiating the Peace of Nérac between Protestants and Catholics in 1579. Appointed lieutenant general of Upper Languedoc in 1580, he took part in the siege of Paris in 1590 after the accession of Henry IV to the throne, and conquered Stenay from the Catholic League in 1591.

In 1591 Henry IV married him to Charlotte de La Marck, heiress to the duchy of Bouillon and of the Principality of Sedan. In 1592 Henry IV made him Marshal of France.

After the death of his wife in 1594, he married Elisabeth of Nassau, a daughter of William the Silent, by his third wife Charlotte de Bourbon, in 1595. In 1593 and 1595, Henry and the Dutch Republic conducted two unsuccessful campaigns against Spanish-held Luxemburg.

Defeated at Doullens, Picardy in 1595 by Fuentes, governor of the Spanish Low Countries, he was sent to England to renew the alliance of France with Queen Elizabeth I of England in 1596. Compromised in the conspiracy of Biron in 1602, he fled to Geneva the following year and had to accept a French protectorate over his duchy of Bouillon in 1606.

At the death of Henry IV, he entered the Council of Regency during the minority of Louis XIII, and intrigued against Maximilien de Béthune, duc de Sully and Concini, the latter a favourite of the queen dowager and regent Marie de' Medici.

In April 1612 the Duke came to London as the ambassador of Marie de' Medici. He was received at court in state, and brought 100 or 250 followers. His lodgings at the Charterhouse, including rooms for his teenage nephew Henri de La Trémoille, were hung with tapestries. He was brought to his first reception at the Banqueting House at Whitehall Palace by the Duke of Lennox in a convoy of 30 coaches. The court was wearing black mourning for the death of Anne Catherine wife of Christian IV of Denmark.

According to the Venetian ambassador, Antonio Foscarini, his instructions included an offer of a marriage between Princess Christine, the second Princess of France, and Prince Henry. Anne of Denmark told one of his senior companions that she would prefer Prince Henry married a French princess without a dowry than a Florentine princess with any amount of gold.

He died in Sedan in 1623.

== Issue ==
Henri married on 19 November 1591, Charlotte de La Marck, suo jure Duchess of Bouillon. They had a son who was born and died on 8 May 1594.

Henri married secondly Elisabeth of Orange-Nassau on 15 April 1595.

- Louise de La Tour d'Auvergne (August 1596 – November 1607);
- Marie de La Tour d'Auvergne (1599 – 24 May 1665) married Henri de La Trémoille, Duke of Thouars and Prince de Talmont, titular King of Jerusalem (1605–1674) and had issue;
- Juliane Catherine de La Tour d'Auvergne (8 October 1604 – 6 October 1637) married François de La Rochefoucauld, Count of Roucy, and had issue;
- Frédéric Maurice de La Tour d'Auvergne (22 October 1605 – 9 August 1652) married Eleonora Catharina van den Bergh and had issue;
- Élisabeth de La Tour d'Auvergne (1606 – 1 December 1685) married Guy de Durfort, mother of Jacques and Guy;
- Henriette Catherine de La Tour d'Auvergne (died 1677) married Amaury Gouyon, marquis de La Moussaye and had issue;
- Henri, vicomte de Turenne, (11 September 1611 – 27 July 1675) married Charlotte de Caumont, daughter of Armand-Nompar de Caumont, duc de la Force.

Children by Adèle Corret, mistress;

- Henri Corret, ancestor of Théophile Corret de La Tour d'Auvergne.

== Sources ==
- Luria, Keith P. (2005). Sacred Boundaries: Religious Coexistence and Conflict in Early-Modern France. The Catholic University of America. ISBN 978-0-8132-1411-5.
- Pitts, Vincent J. (2009). Henri IV of France: His Reign and Age. Johns Hopkins University Press.
