= Robert IV de La Marck =

Robert IV de la Marck
- Duc de Bouillon
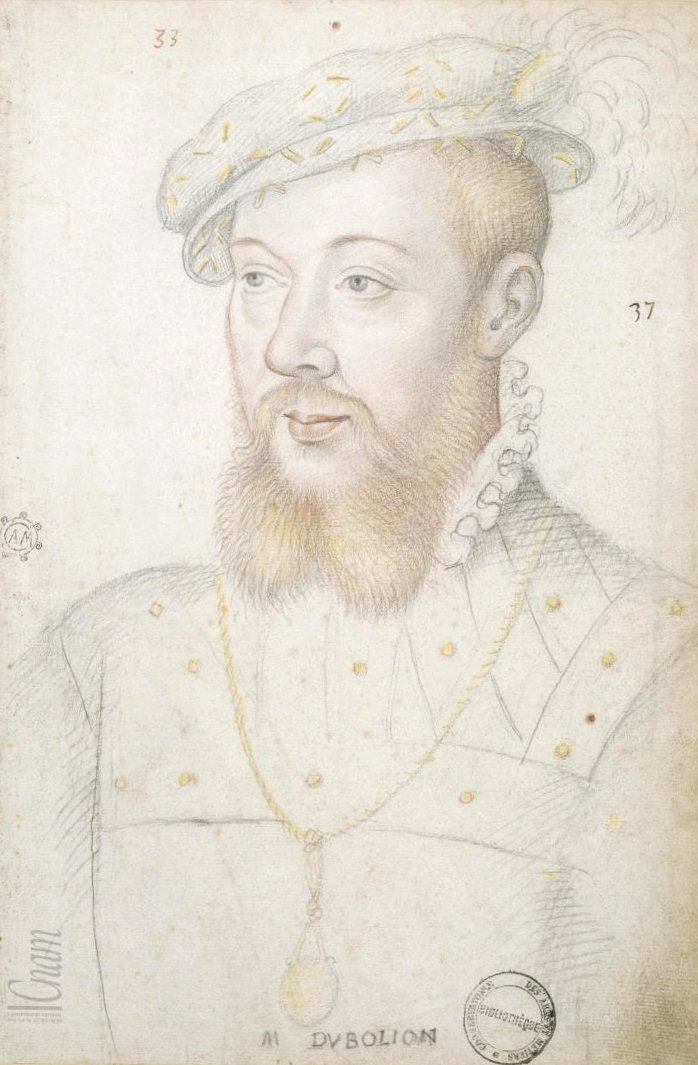
- Robert IV de La Marck by an unknown artist around 1570
- Other titles: Governor of Normandy; Prince of Sedan
- Born: 15 January 1512; Kingdom of France
- Died: 4 November 1556 (aged 44); Guise, Kingdom of France
- Family: House of La Marck
- Spouse: Françoise de Brézé
- Issue: Henri-Robert de la Marck
- Father: Robert III de la Marck
- Mother: Guillemette de Sarrebruck

Robert IV de La Marck (15 January 1512 – 4 November 1556) was Duke of Bouillon, Seigneur of Sedan and a Marshal of France. He rose to prominence during the reign of Henri II of France as a favourite of both the king and his mistress Diane de Poitiers. In 1547 he was elevated to the rank of Marshal of France. In 1549 he established himself as a sovereign prince, with Sedan, France granted the status of a principality. In 1552 he was granted the office of governor of Normandy, an office that historically gone to Normans or members of the royal family.

In 1552 he succeeded alongside other members of the war party in pushing for a resumption of the Italian Wars, he fought at the famous siege of Metz and soon thereafter succeeded in restoring control over his duchy which had been in imperial control since 1521. The following year during Charles V, Holy Roman Emperor's campaign into France he was captured at Hesdin, he would remain a prisoner for the next three years, living in poor conditions until he was finally ransomed in 1556. Not long after his release from captivity he died.

== Early life and family ==
Robert was the only son of Robert III de La Marck and Guillemette de Sarrebruck. At the age of 17, he became captain of the Swiss Guards.

== Reign of Henri II ==
=== Elevation to favour ===
In 1547, Bouillon was made a Marshal of France by Henry II of France, and he was sent to Rome as French Ambassador. In 1549 he would claim Sedan as a Principality, his son later styling himself as Prince of Sedan. In the early years of Henri's reign, he found himself a regular member of the conseil des affairs which set the direction of royal policy.

=== Italian Wars ===
Bouillon was a keen advocate for the resumption of the Italian Wars, hoping to regain his territory and Diane de Poitiers championed this cause with him. In 1552, Bouillon participated in the Siege of Metz and took back possession of his Duchy of Bouillon, which had been occupied by the troops of Charles V, Holy Roman Emperor since 1521. Despite its occupation it would not be returned to his family in the Peace of Cateau Cambresis. Instead Henri returned it to the bishop of Liège.

In 1552, he would be made governor of Normandy, his career in the region carefully fostered by his patron Diane de Poitiers. His influence in the province was limited by his lack of connections to the nobility of the area.

=== Prisoner ===
As Lieutenant General in Normandy, Bouillon was made prisoner in Hesdin in July 1553. He would be kept in prison and badly treated in Flanders until the Treaty of Vaucelles of February 1556 under which he was released for a ransom of 60,000 écus. His ransom had previously been set at 80,000 écus however Diane protested that she could not afford such an amount. Bouillon's wife had travelled to Brussels to plead for a more affordable ransom, however this was only agreed to due to his poor health, which meant that several days after release he died. He is buried at the Eglise Saint-Laurent in Sedan.

== Marriage and children ==
Robert married in 1539 Françoise de Brézé, daughter of Louis de Brézé and Diane de Poitiers. They had:

- Henri Robert (1539–1574), Duke of Bouillon and Prince of Sedan, married Françoise de Bourbon, daughter of Louis, Duke of Montpensier.
- Charles Robert (1541–1622), Count of Maulévrier.
- Christian, died young.
- Antoinette (1542–1591), married Henri I de Montmorency
- Guillemette (1543–1544)
- Diane (born 1544), married 1) Jacques de Clèves, duc de Nevers, 2) Henri de Clermont, 3) Jean Babou, Count of Sagonne.
- Guillemette (1545–1592), married John III, Count of Ligny
- Françoise (born 1547), abbess
- Catherine (born 1548), married Jacques de Harlay, seigneur de Champvallon

== Source ==
- Baumgartner, Frederic (1988). Henry II: King of france 1547-1559. Duke University Press.
- Carroll, Stuart (1998). Noble Power During the French Wars of Religion: The Guise Affinity and the Catholic Cause in Normandy. Cambridge University Press.
- Carroll, Stuart (2013). "'Nager entre deux eaux': The Princes and the Ambiguities of French Protestantism". Sixteenth Century Journal. 44 (4). doi:10.1086/SCJ24246299.
- Carroll, Stuart (2009). Martyrs and Murderers: The Guise Family and the Making of Europe. Oxford University Press.
- Daussy, Hugues (2002). Les huguenots et le roi le combat politique de Philippe Duplessis-Mornay, 1572-1600 (in French). Droz. ISBN 9782600006675.
- Konnert, Mark W. (2017). Local Politics in the French Wars of Religion: The Towns of Champagne, the Duc de Guise, and the Catholic League, 1560–95. Routledge. ISBN 9781351921596.
- Potter, David (1990). "Marriage and Cruelty among the Protestant Nobility in Sixteenth-Century France: Diane de Barbançon and Jean de Rohan, 1561-7". European History Quarterly. 20 (January 1): 5–38. doi:10.1177/026569149002000101. S2CID 144245625.
- Potter, David, ed. (2004). Foreign Intelligence and Information in Elizabethan England. Vol. 25: Two English Treatises on the State of France, 1580–1584. Cambridge University Press.
- Saulnier, V.L. (1955). "L'Auteur du Florimont en Prose Imprimé: Girard Moët de Pommesson". Bibliothèque d'Humanisme et Renaissance (in French). 17. Librairie Droz.
