= Robert II de la Marck =

- Duke of Bouillon; Lord of Sedan
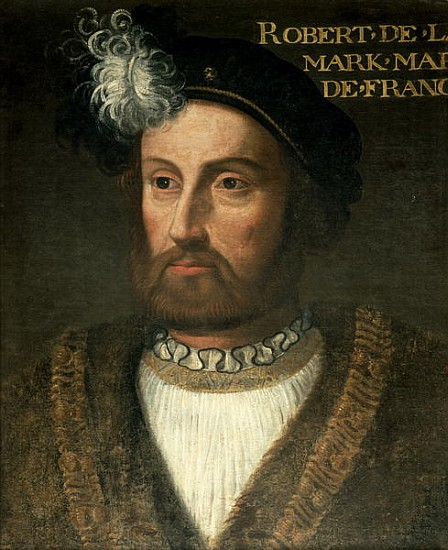
- Born: 1468
- Died: November 1536 (aged 67–68)
- Family: House of La Marck
- Spouse: Catherine de Croÿ
- Issue: Philippe; Robert III; Philip; Antoine; William; John; Jacques; Jacqueline
- Father: Robert I de La Marck
- Mother: Jeanne de Saulcy

Robert II de la Marck (1468 – November 1536) was the Duke of Bouillon and Lord of Sedan. He was the son of Robert I de la Marck and Jeanne de Saulcy.

== Biography ==
Robert would fight against the supporters of John de Horne, Bishop of Liege, along with his own minor border engagements in the latter 15th century. He fought at the battle of Novara, saving the lives of his sons, was seriously wounded, taking two months to recover. In 1518, Robert left French service after his company of lances was disbanded due to pillaging. Robert led pillaging expeditions, launched from the castle of Logne, into the Low Countries which belonged to Emperor Charles V. In 1521, he placed Virton under siege, thus instigating the Four Years War. During the war between Charles and Francis, Robert would be driven from his lands by Charles, which were restored following the Treaty of Madrid (1526).

Robert died in 1536 and was buried in the church of St. Laurence in Sedan.

== Family ==
Robert married Catherine de Croÿ, daughter of Philip I of Croÿ-Chimay, Count of Chimay, in 1490. They had:

- Philippine, m. Renaud sieur de Brederode in 1521.
- Robert III de La Marck, seigneur of Florange (d.1537)
- Philip (d.1545)
- Antoine
- William seigneur de Jametz
- John seigneur de Jametz
- Jacques chevalier de l'ordre de Saint-Jean de Jérusalem
- Jacqueline, nun

== See also ==
- Château de Sedan

== Sources ==
- Bietenholz, Peter G.; Deutscher, Thomas Brian, eds. (1995). Contemporaries of Erasmus: A Biographical Register of the Renaissance and Reformation. University of Toronto Press.
- Erasmus, Desiderius (1979). The Correspondence of Erasmus: Letters 594-841. Translated by Mynors, R. A. B.; Thomson, D.F.S. University of Toronto Press.
- Hauser, Henri (1906). Les Sources de l'histoire de France - Seizième siècle (1494-1610) (in French). Vol. 1.
- Hove, Isabelle Vanden (2024). The Dukes of Arenberg: The Thousand-Year History of a Noble Family. Leuven University Press.
- Kodres, Krista; Mänd, Anu, eds. (2013). Images and Objects in Ritual Practices in Medieval and Early Modern Northern and Central Europe. Cambridge Scholars Publishing.
- Louisa, Angelo (1995). "Bouillon, Robert II de la Marck, Duke de". In Dupuy, Trevor N.; Johnson, Curt; Bongard, David L. (eds.). The Harper Encyclopedia of Military Biography. Castle Books.
- Potter, David (2008). Renaissance France at War: Armies, Culture and Society, C.1480-1560. The Boydell Press.
- Wolfe, Michael (2009). "Pain and Memory: The War Wounds of Blaise de Monluc". In Lorcin, P.; Brewer, D. (eds.). France and Its Spaces of War: Experience, Memory, Image. Springer.
