= Robert III de La Marck =

Marshal of France (1491–1537)

Robert III de la Marck
- Seigneur de Fleuranges
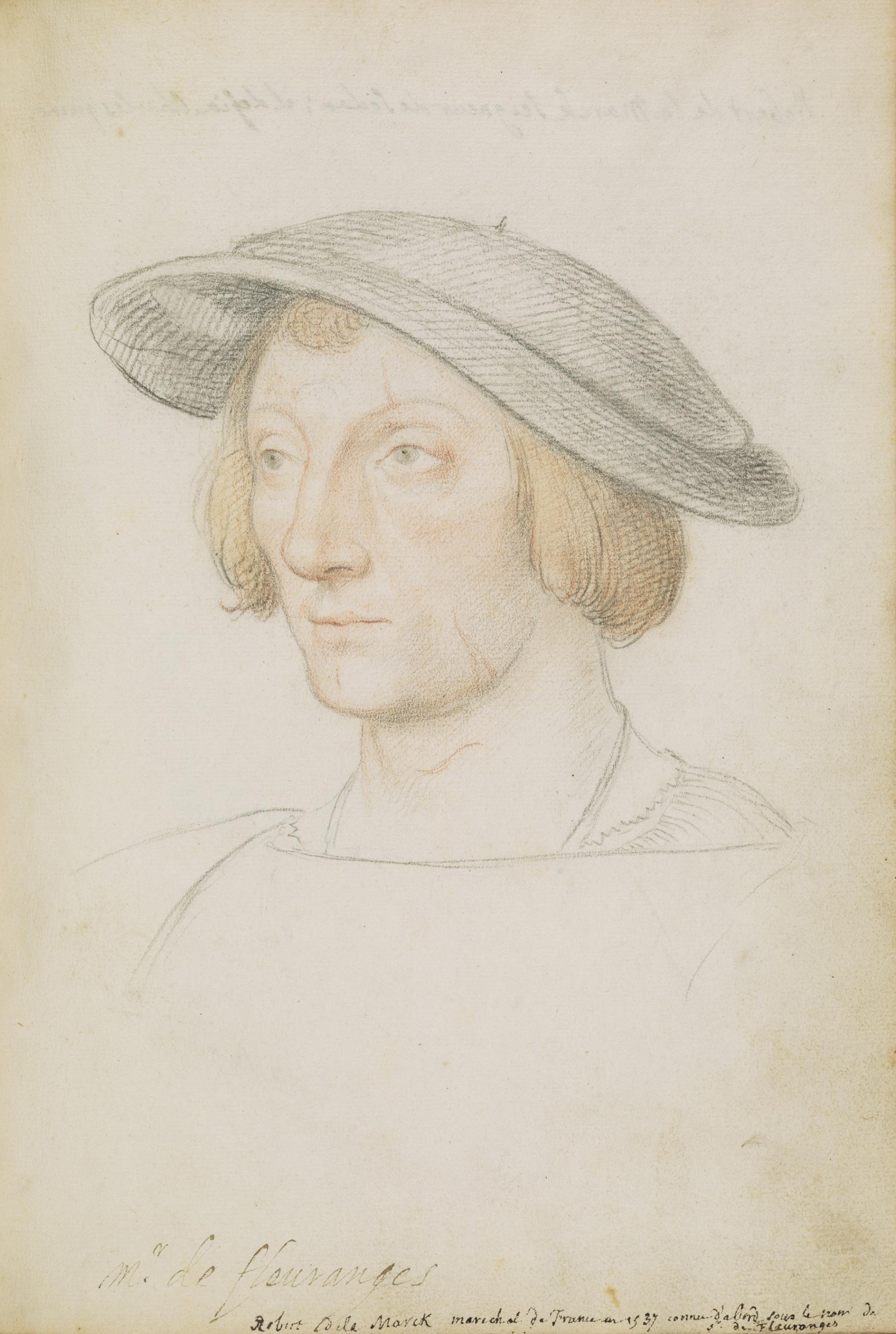
- Crayon portrait by Jean Clouet
- Other titles: Marshal of France
- Born: 1491; Sedan, Ardennes
- Died: December 1537 (aged 45–46); Longjumeau
- Family: House of La Marck
- Spouse: Guillemette de Sarrebruck
- Issue: Robert IV de La Marck
- Father: Robert II de La Marck
- Mother: Catherine de Croÿ

Robert III de La Marck (1491–1537), Seigneur of Fleuranges, was a Marshal of France and historian. Self-styled "The Young Adventurer," he was one of Francis I's close companions in the last years of Louis XII's life, and remained close after Francis ascended the throne. Robert campaigned with Francis' Italian campaigns being captured at Pavia. During his imprisonment he wrote a personal history. Upon being freed, he returned to participation in the Italian Wars, seeing service at the defence of Péronne in 1536. When he learnt of his father's death, he set out for Amboise, but was stricken by illness and died at Longjumeau in 1537.

== Biography ==
Born in Sedan, Ardennes, in 1491, Robert was the son of Robert II de la Marck; Duke of Bouillon, Seigneur of Sedan and Fleuranges, and Catherine de Croÿ.

A fondness for military exercises displayed itself in his earliest years, and at the age of ten, Robert was sent to the court of Louis XII, and placed in charge of the count of Angoulême, afterwards King Francis I. In 1510 he married a niece of the cardinal d'Amboise, Guillemette de Sarrebruck, but after three months he quit his home to join the French army in the Milanese. With a handful of troops Robert threw himself into Verona, then besieged by the Venetians; but the siege was protracted, and being impatient for more active service, he rejoined the army. He then took part in the relief of Mirandola, besieged by the troops of Pope Julius II, and in other actions of the campaign.

In 1512 the French being driven from Italy, Robert was sent into Flanders to levy a body of 10,000 men, in command of which, under his father, he returned to Italy in 1513, seized Alessandria, and vigorously assailed Novara. But the French were defeated, and Robert narrowly escaped with his life, having received more than forty wounds. He was rescued by his father and sent to Vercelli, and thence to Lyon.

Returning to Italy with Francis in 1515, Robert distinguished himself in various affairs, and especially at Marignano, where he had a horse shot under him, and contributed so powerfully to the victory of the French that the king knighted him with his own hand. He next took Cremona, and was there called home by the news of his father's illness. In 1519 Robert was sent into Germany on the difficult errand of inducing the electors to give their votes in favor of Francis; but in this he failed. The war in Italy being rekindled, he accompanied the king there, fought at Pavia (1525), and was taken prisoner with his royal master. The emperor, irritated by the defection of his father, Robert II, sent him into confinement in Flanders, where he remained for some years.

During this imprisonment he was created marshal of France. He employed his enforced leisure in writing his Histoire des choses mémorables advenues du règne de Louis XII et de François I, depuis 1499 jusqu'en l'an 1521. In this work he designates himself Jeune Adventureux. Within a small compass he gives many curious and interesting details of the time, writing only of what he had seen, and in a very simple but vivid style. The book was first published in 1735, by Abbé Lambert, who added historical and critical notes; and it has been reprinted in several collections.

The last occasion in which Robert was engaged in active service was at the defence of Péronne, besieged by the count of Nassau in 1536. In the following year he heard of his father's death, and set out from Amboise for his estate of La Marck; but he was seized with illness at Longjumeau, and died there in December 1537.

== Marriage ==
Robert married Guillemette de Sarrebruck and had:

- Robert IV de La Marck (1512–1556), Duke of Bouillon, Prince of Sedan and Marshal of France.

== Sources ==
- Haan, Bertrand (2010). Une paix pour l'éternité: la négociation du traité du Cateau-Cambrésis (in French). Casa de Velazquez.
- Hauser, Henri (1906). Les Sources de l'histoire de France - Seizième siècle (1494-1610) (in French). Vol. 1.
- Potter, David (2003). "Chivalry and Professionalism in the French Armies of the Renaissance". In Trim, David J. B. (ed.). The Chivalric Ethos and the Development of Military Professionalism. Brill.
- Potter, David (2008). Renaissance France at War: Armies, Culture and Society, C.1480-1560. The Boydell Press.
- Saulnier, V.L. (1955). "L'Auteur du Forimont en Prose Imprimé: Girard Moët de Pommesson". Bibliothèque d'Humanisme et Renaissance (in French). 17 (2): 207–217. JSTOR 20673765.
- Wolfe, Michael (2009). "Pain and Memory: The War Wounds of Blaise de Monluc". In Lorcin, P.; Brewer, D. (eds.). France and Its Spaces of War: Experience, Memory, Image. Palgrave Macmillan.
