= Saint-Yved de Braine =

Abbatiale Saint-Yved
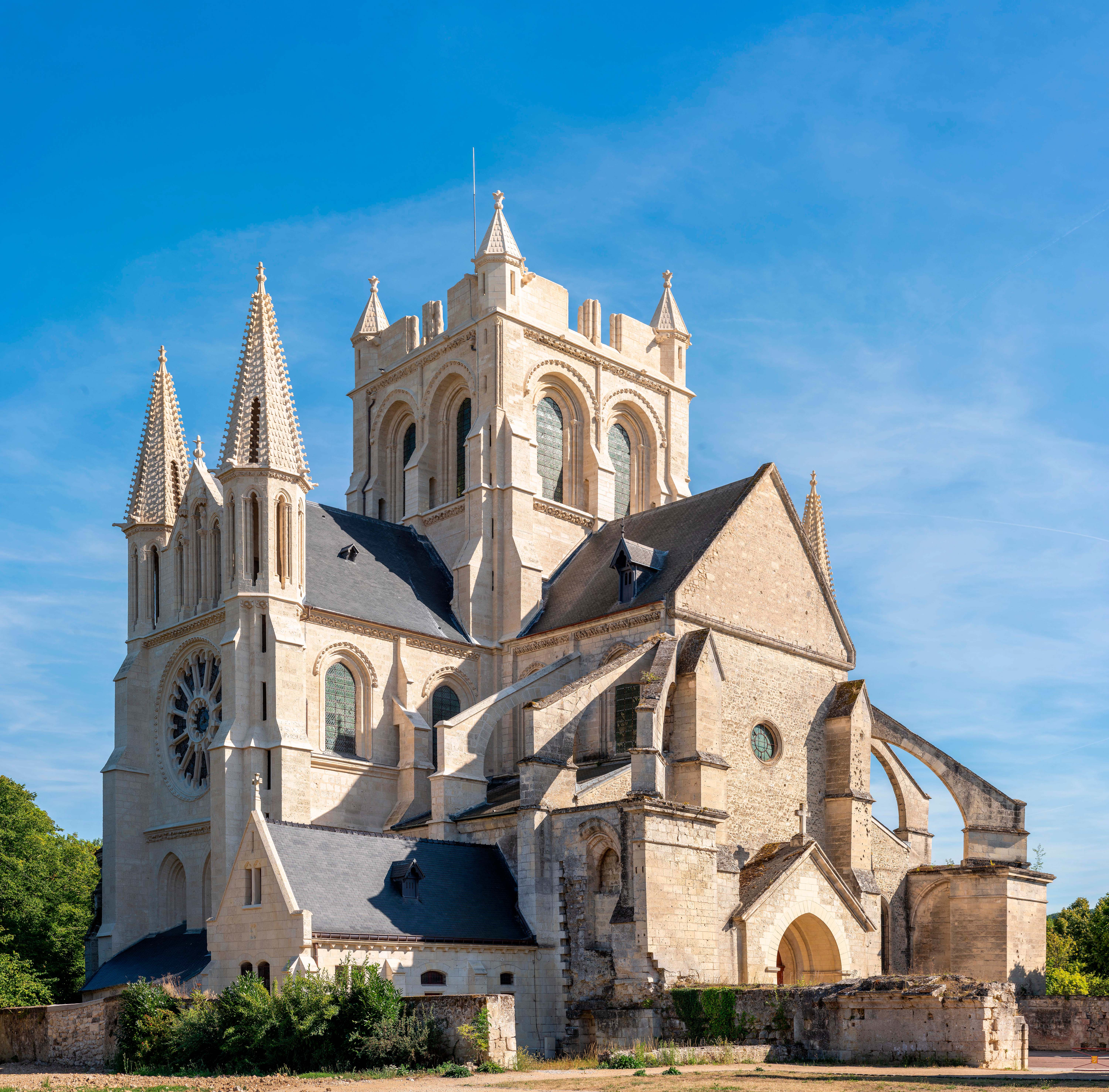

- Location within France
- Interactive map of Abbatiale Saint-Yved

Monastery information
- Established: 1180

Site
- Location: Braine, Aisne, France
- Coordinates: 49°20′30″N 3°31′55″E

Saint-Yved is a church in Braine, Aisne, France, in which the Counts of Dreux are buried. It was dedicated to Saint Yved, whose relics were brought to Braine (Braisne) in the ninth century. Originally a chapter of secular canons, the Braine Abbey was given to the Premonstratensian order by the Bishop of Soissons in 1130.

== Location ==
Braine is an ancient land steeped in history at the crossroads of an ancient Roman road. At an early date it was the summer residence of the Merovingian and Carolingian kings. Through inheritance it became the property of the Counts of Dreux, the younger branch of the Capetians. The latter strengthened the castle of Folie, which was reduced to ruins in World War I. Of the castle there now remains only the entry and the cellars. From the Middle Ages there also survives the remains of a half-timbered house and the abbey church of Saint-Yved. This church was classified as historical monument in 1840.

== History ==
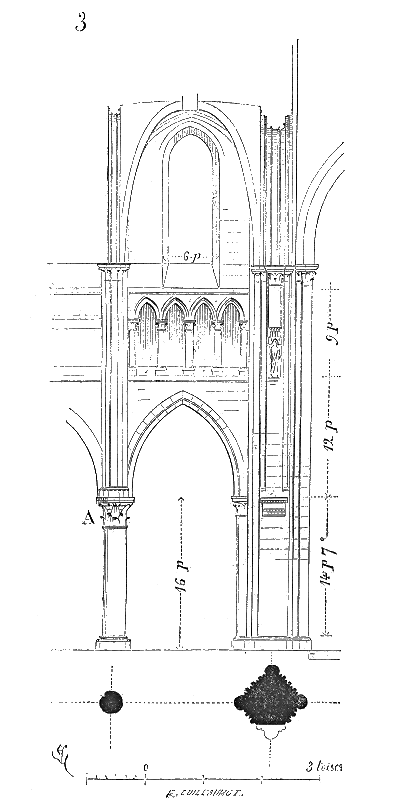
Ogive de l'église Saint-Yved et Notre-Dame

The abbey church was built at the request of Agnès de Baudement, wife of Robert I, Count of Dreux, according to the plans of Andre de Baudement. It is distinguished by the tympanum of the central portal, which has been saved. This was restored behind the current facade. With four bays, the nave joins the transept by a remarkable lantern tower rising to 33 metres (108 ft). The plan of the apse has an excellent and rare disposition. Some of the sculptures of the portal are deposited in the museum of Soissons .

The Abbey was the necropolis of the Capetian counts of Dreux and from the ninth century to the French Revolution was the custodian of the relics of Saint Yved and Saint Victricius. The relics were moved to the cathedral of Rouen in the nineteenth century.

Before the revolution the Church of Saint Yved and Notre Dame contained magnificent tombs covered with enameled copper tiles, whose drawings are now in the Gaignères collection in the Bodleian Library, Oxford. The abbey suffered greatly during the Revolution, and was gradually demolished. According to the Dictionnaire raisonné de l'architecture few other buildings better show the symmetrical system used by master architects of the late twelfth century."

== People buried in the abbey ==
- Robert I, Count of Dreux, († 1188) and Agnès de Baudement († 1204), his wife
- Robert II, Count of Dreux († 1218) and Yolande de Coucy († 1222), his wife
- Peter I, Duke of Brittany († 1250)
- Robert III, Count of Dreux († 1234).
- Robert IV, Count of Dreux († 1282).
- Heart of John I, Count of Dreux († 1249) and Marie de Bourbon-Dampierre († 1274), his wife
- Robert de Dreux, Viscount of Beu and of Châteaudun († 1264) et Clémence de Châteaudun († 1259), his wife
- Guillemette de Sarrebruck, countess of Braine, dame de Montagu, wife of Robert III de La Marck
- Françoise de Brézé (1518-1574), daughter of Diane de Poitiers, comtesse de Maulévrier, baronne de Mauny et de Sérignan. Wife of Robert IV de La Marck, called le Seigneur de Florange, Duke of Bouillon, Prince of Sedan, count of Braine and Maulévrier, died from poisoning in 1556 on the orders of the Emperor Charles V.

== Notes and references ==
Citations

Sources

- Abbé Henri Congnet, Notice sur la translation des reliques de Saint Yved et Saint Victrice en la ville de Braine, Paris, 1865.
- Stanislas Prioux, Monographie de l’ancienne abbaye royale Saint-Yved de Braine, Paris, Didron et Caudrillier, 1859.
- Bernard Ardura, Abbayes, prieurés et monastères de l'ordre de Prémontré en France, des origines à nos jours, Nancy, 1993
- P. Evermode, L'abbaye royale de Saint-Yved de Braisne et son miracle eucharistique, dans Revue de l'Ordre de Prémontré et de sa mission, 1912.
