= Françoise de Paroy =

Françoise d'Estamville, Dame de Paroy also called Mme de Parois or de Parroys (died 1557), was a French court official. Some French sources give her name and title as, "Françoise d'Estainville, dame de Chevreaul et de Perroye".

== Life ==
She married Jean de Vienne, baron de Chevreaux (in Jura) in 1544.

She succeeded Janet Stewart, Lady Fleming as the governess of queen Mary, Queen of Scots in 1551, and remained in service until 1557. As Mary formally left the Royal Nursery in 1553 and started to attend court as an adult, Paroy's position would essentially be that of a chief lady-in-waiting, though official ladies-in-waitings were not engaged for Mary while she remained unwed.

Mary, Queen of Scots made "cotignac", a kind of quince cheese in the chamber of Madame de Paroy in 1551. Paroy wrote in 1553 from Villers-Cotterêts to Mary of Guise, the mother of Mary, Queen of Scots, explaining that the young queen had been ill and her doctors prescribed rhubarb. Mahaut des Essartz, Madame de Curel had left the household after an argument, leaving de Paroy as only person left to dress the queen's hair.

Her letter to Mary of Guise written in September 1554 at Villers-Cotterêts mentions that the young queen was in good health. She had found a painter for the queen's portrait who had formerly been employed by François de Lorraine (d. 1545) at Nancy, and the portrait would show how the queen had grown. Another letter mentions the young queen's progress in learning Latin. She asked for money for Mary, for mules for transport, and especially for a costume of cloth-of-gold to wear at the wedding of Nicolas, Count of Vaudémont (1524-1577) and Princess Joanna of Savoy-Nemours (1532–1568) at Fontainebleau. Paroy asked permission to buy two diamonds to have a "touret" headband lengthened using rubies and pearls the queen already owned.

Françoise de Paroy wrote that she was sending Mary's portrait to her mother Mary of Guise in Scotland. The artist started work on the picture in September 1554 at the palace of Villers-Cotterêts. Paroy signed this letter "D'Estamville".

Françoise de Paroy was described as a person with irreproachable character. However, she was not liked by Queen Mary. Paroy frequently demanded more funds from Mary of Guise and Scotland to uphold Mary Stuart's expenses: this was difficult for the poor funds of Scotland, but Paroy was also accused of being partly to blame for the poor monetary situation, and it was hinted though not explicitly said that she may have stolen money. Madame de Brêne or de Brien (Guillemette de Sarrebruche, the widowed and wealthy Countess of Brenne), was suggested as a substitute.

De Paroy was favored by queen Catherine de Medici and therefore came to be viewed with suspicion, and Mary accused her of talking ill of her to Catherine. The final conflict occurred in April 1556. de Paroy disliked Mary giving away her dresses to relatives as a deprivation of her own privilege to Mary's old clothes, something which also caused discord with Mary. This conflict resulted in Paroy being essentially relieved from her duties, though she was not formally fired.

She fell ill with dropsy in 1556 and was forced to leave court, and there was talk of a replacement, as it was not considered suitable for Mary to be without a female supervisor. De Paroy, however, formally kept her office until one year prior to Mary's wedding in 1558, after which Mary was instead given an official lady-in-waiting, Guillemette de Sarrebruck.

She died in Paris on 24 June 1557.
