= François Quesnel =

French painter

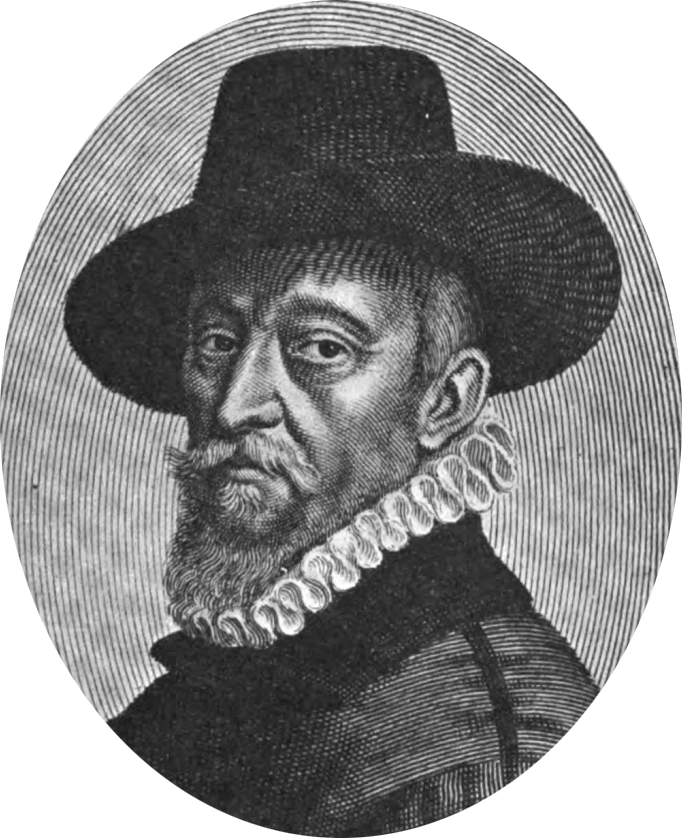
- François Quesnel, self-portrait, 1613, engraved by Michel Lasne
- Born: 1543 c. Edinburgh, Scotland
- Died: 1619; Paris, France
- Occupation: Painter
- Father: Pierre Quesnel

François Quesnel (French pronunciation: [fʁɑ̃swa kenɛl]; c. 1543–1619) was a French painter of Scottish extraction.

== Biography ==
The son of the French painter Pierre Quesnel and his Scottish wife Madeleine Digby, born in Edinburgh while his father worked for Mary of Guise, Quesnel found patronage at the French court of Catherine de Medici and her son, Henri III (illustration). He married Charlotte Richandeau, with whom he had four children. A widower, he remarried in 1584 Marguerite Le Masson, who gave him ten more children, among whom were Nicolas (died 1632) and Augustin, painters, and Jacques, bookseller.

In le Paris he worked as a decorator and a designer of cartoons for tapestry, but it is as a portrait painter, both in oils and in delicately tinted pencil or red and black chalk, that he is chiefly remembered. Some portraits were engraved by Thomas de Leu and Michel Lasne, and in 1609 he drew a map of Paris for engraving by Pierre Vallet. He died in Paris.

== Tapestry designs ==
In 1585 François provided a cartoon for a tapestry of Christ preaching on the steps of the Temple for the Church of Saint Madeleine in Paris. In August 1586, François contracted to provide designs for tapestries of the Life of the Virgin for Renée of Guise Lorraine, Abbess of the Convent of Saint-Pierre-les-Dames at Reims and sister of his father's employer in Scotland, Mary of Guise (who was buried in the Convent). The eight tapestries and his cartoons were to be 1.5 ells in height, and 10.25 ells in length. Each was to include the heraldry of the Abbess in the centre. The cost of this design work was 5 ecu sols per Paris ell. These tapestries following his designs were woven in Paris.

== Gallery ==
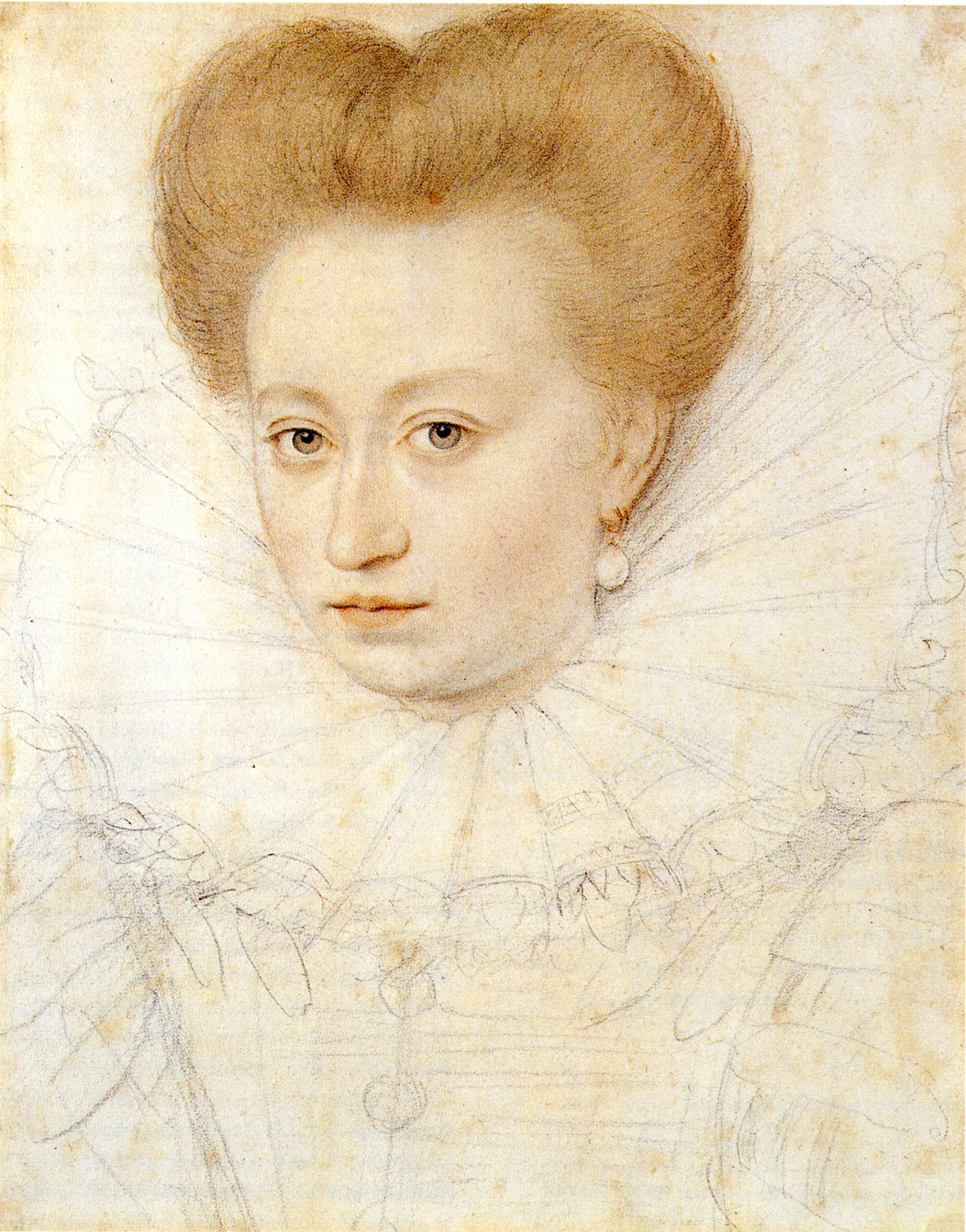
Portrait, possibly of Catherine-Charlotte de la Trémoille, ca 1589, attributed to Quesnel

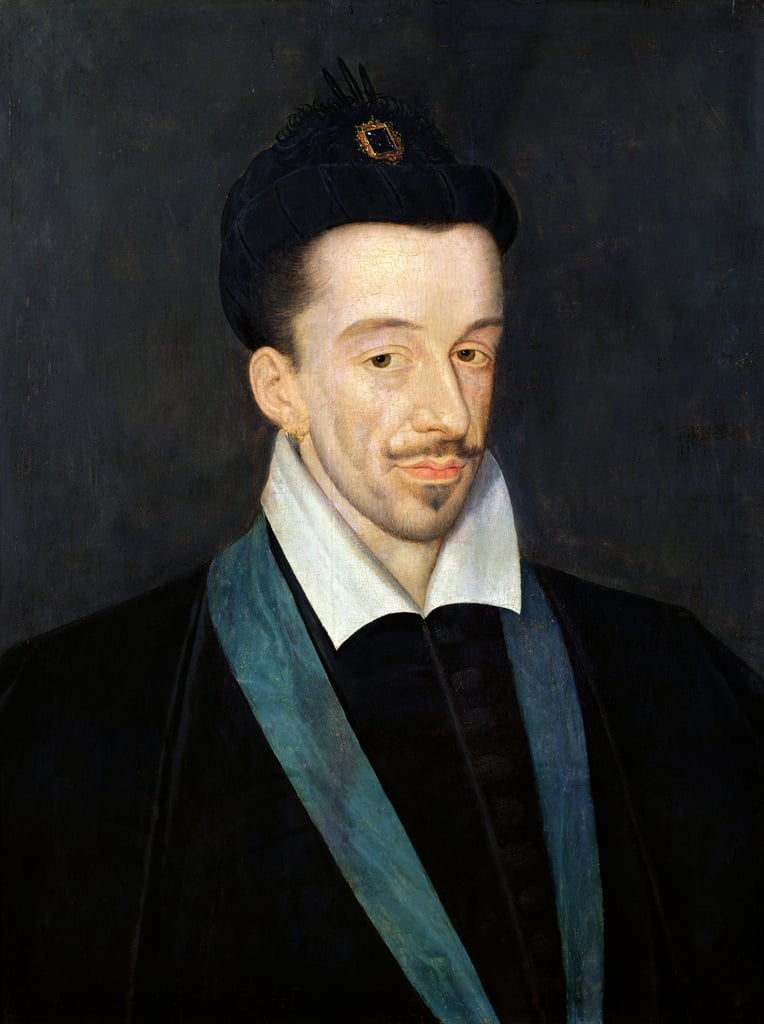
Portrait of Henri III of France, ca. 1582-86 attributed to Quesnel (Musée du Louvre)

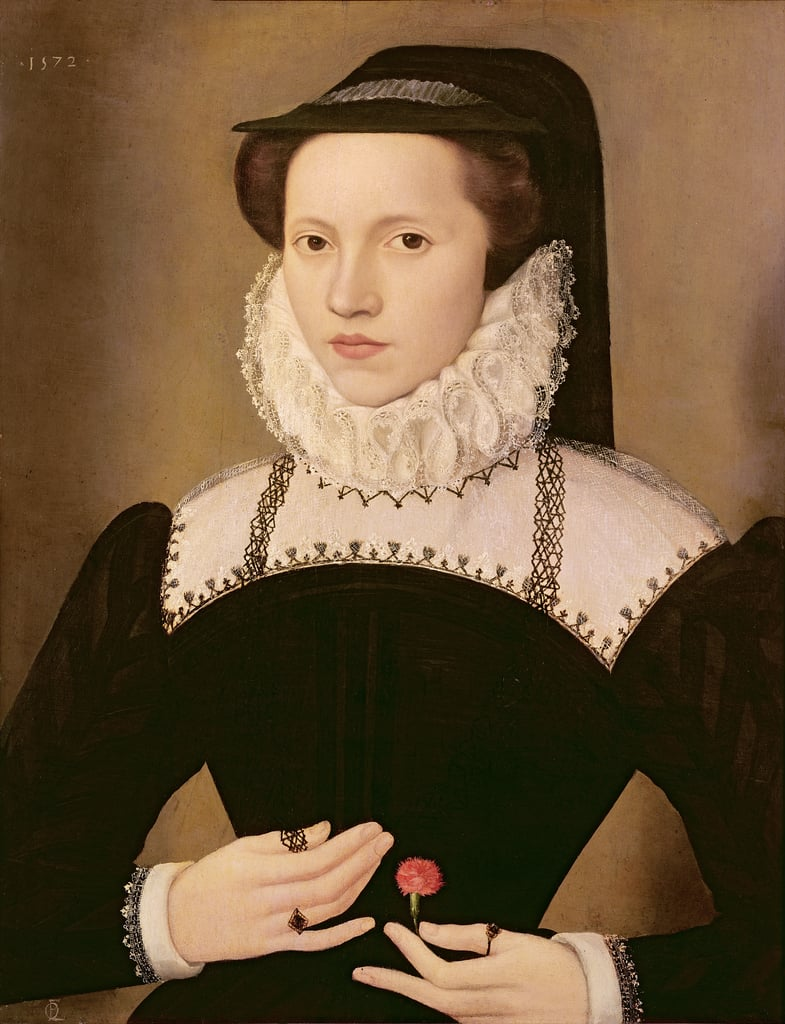
Portrait of Mary Anne Waltham, Althorp House.

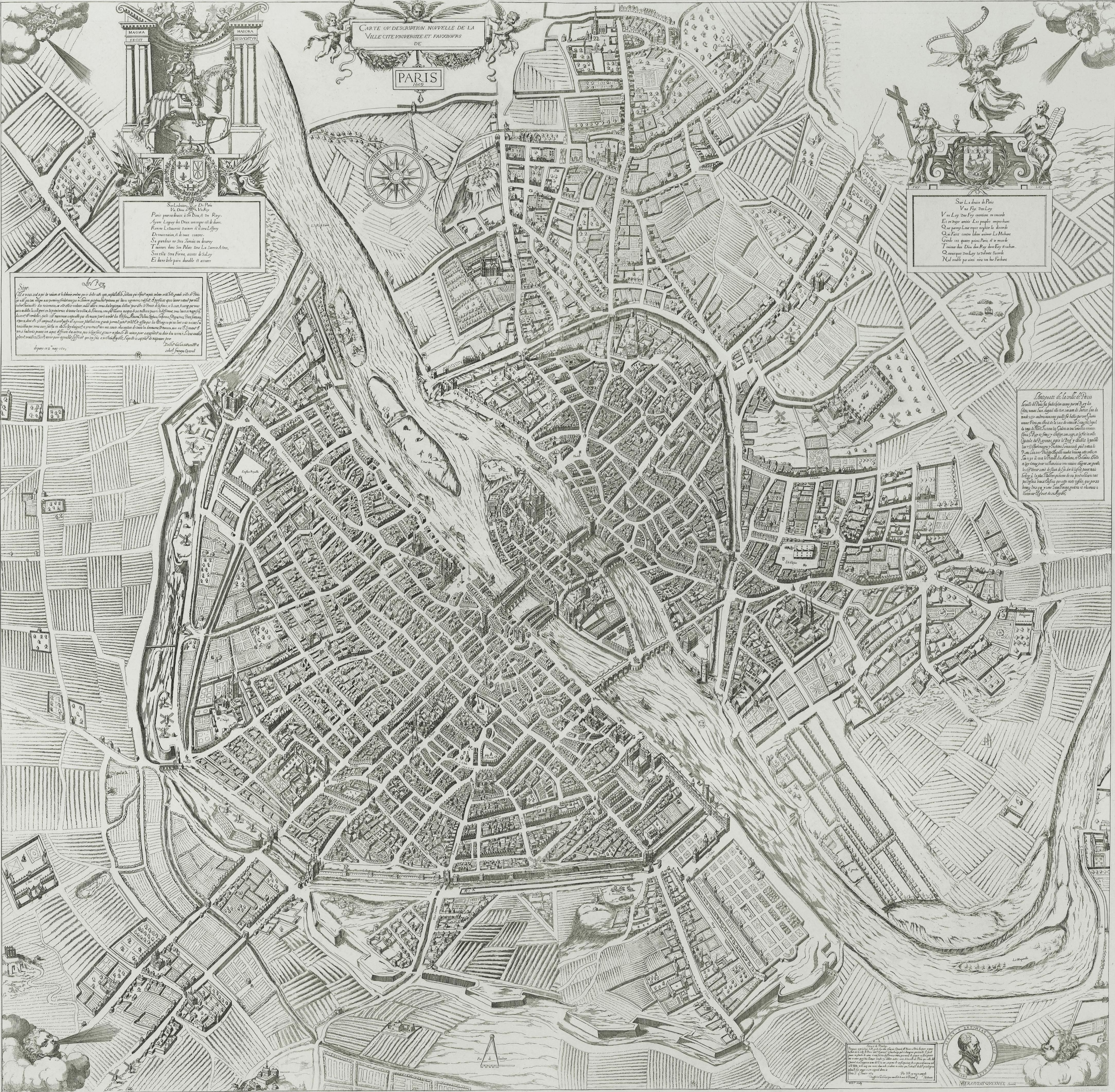
Quesnel's 1609 map of Paris, engraved by Pierre Vallet, le jeune

== External links and images ==
- Several portrait drawings, some identified sitters, Harvard Art Museums
- Engraving of François Quesnel by Pierre Brebiette, Joconde database, with motto 'Quo pedibus Ferri non queo mente Feror.'
- Portrait of a Noblewoman (attributed), Detroit Institute of Arts
- Portrait of a Bearded Man (attributed), Cleveland Museum of Art
- Portrait of a Bearded Man (attributed), Royal Collection
- Portrait of a Nobleman, 1589 (attributed), Ackland Art Museum, University of North Carolina
- Biography of Quesnel (in French)
