= 02110 =

02110 may refer to:

- Downtown Boston, part of Boston, Massachusetts, US
- Braine, Aisne, a commune in the Aisne department, France
