= Henri Congnet =

French secular Catholic priest and historian

- Born: 6 December 1795; Soissons
- Died: 5 July 1870 (aged 74); Soissons
- Occupations: Historian; Hagiographer

Henri Congnet (6 December 1795 – 5 July 1870) was a 19th-century French secular Catholic priest and historian, also a member of the Société asiatique and hagiographer.

== Selected publications ==
- Marie honorée dans les classes ou Mois de Marie (Grec-Latin) Extrait des Pères de l’Église grecque et des Saintes Écritures; ouvrage contenant, en outre, les hommages rendus par quelques littérateurs contemporains à Marie de Nazareth – Paris 1837
- Grammaire grecque accompagnée d'exercices et de questionnaires – Paris 1838
- Le Maitre d'études des collèges royaux et communaux – Paris 1845
- Grand manuel ou Manuel pratique pour la première communion et la confirmation – Paris 1858
- Madame de Bussières ou La vie chrétienne et charitable au milieu du monde – Dédié aux mères chrétienne – Paris 1867
- Soldat et prêtre ou Le modèle de la vie sacerdotale et militaire (L'abbé Timothée Marprez) Paris 1865
- Notice sur la translation des reliques de Yved de Rouen et Victricius en la ville de Braine – Paris 1865
- Enchiridion (manuel) de ceux qui commencent le grec, pour servir de premier texte d'explication – Paris 1847 (1re édition)
- Grammaire de la langue grecque comparée perpétuellement à la langue latine – Paris 1845
- Joseph, Ruth, Tobiy et extraits bibliques suivis de quarante-six fables d'Aesop, pieces by Claudius Aelianus et autres auteurs et des fables choisies de Babrius, avec les exercices grammaticaux et les renvois perpétuels à la grammaire... ouvrage formant une chrestomathie élémentaire... Texte grec – Paris 1850 (1re édition)
- Le Livre des jeunes professeurs, contenant : première partie, la méthode pour commencer les humanités – Paris 1843
- Le Pieux helléniste sanctifiant la journée par la prière. Grec-Latin – Paris 1839
- Manuel des verbes irréguliers, défectifs et difficiles de la langue grecque, avec des exercices – Paris 1837
- [paradigmes des verbes grecs et résumé des règles de la formation de leurs temps – Paris 1837
- Prosodie grecque after the paintings by François Passow – Paris 1848
- Collaboration à l'écriture de l'ouvrage hagiographique Vies des Saints, Les Petits Bollandistes – 1870

Bollandiste: name given to the drafters of the lives of saints
