= Madeleine Buonaiuti =

Madeleine Buonaiuti (d. 1580), was a French court official. She served as dame d'atours to the queen of France, Catherine de' Medici from 1552, and as such the deputy Première dame d'honneur in 1552–1560.

== Life ==
Madeleine Buonaiuti belonged to a family who immigrated to France from Florence. She was first married to the poet Luigi Alamanni (d. 1556), and in 1558 to the courtier Jean-Baptiste de Gondi, brother of Antoine de Gondi, in a marriage arranged by the queen.

She was a confidante of Catherine, and belonged to the inner circle of the queen which was dominated by Italians, particularly members of the Gondi family. She was initially one of the Dames (lady-in-waiting) of the queen, and was promoted to the second most important office of a lady-in-waiting, dame d'atour, after Marie-Catherine Gondi in 1552: as such she was deputy Première dame d'honneur, and because the holder of the office, Françoise de Brézé, was absent from court from 1553 onward, Buonaiuti actually managed that office as well.

She was the member of a literary circle through her first marriage and was dedicated the Primo libre deelle lettere (1546) by Niccolo Martelli, as well as poems by Benedetto Varchi.

Court offices
Preceded by Jacqueline de l'Hospital	Dame d'atour to the Queen of France; 1552–1559	Succeeded by Guyonne de Breüil
