= Françoise de Brézé =

French noblewoman and courtier (d. 1577)

- Première dame d'honneur
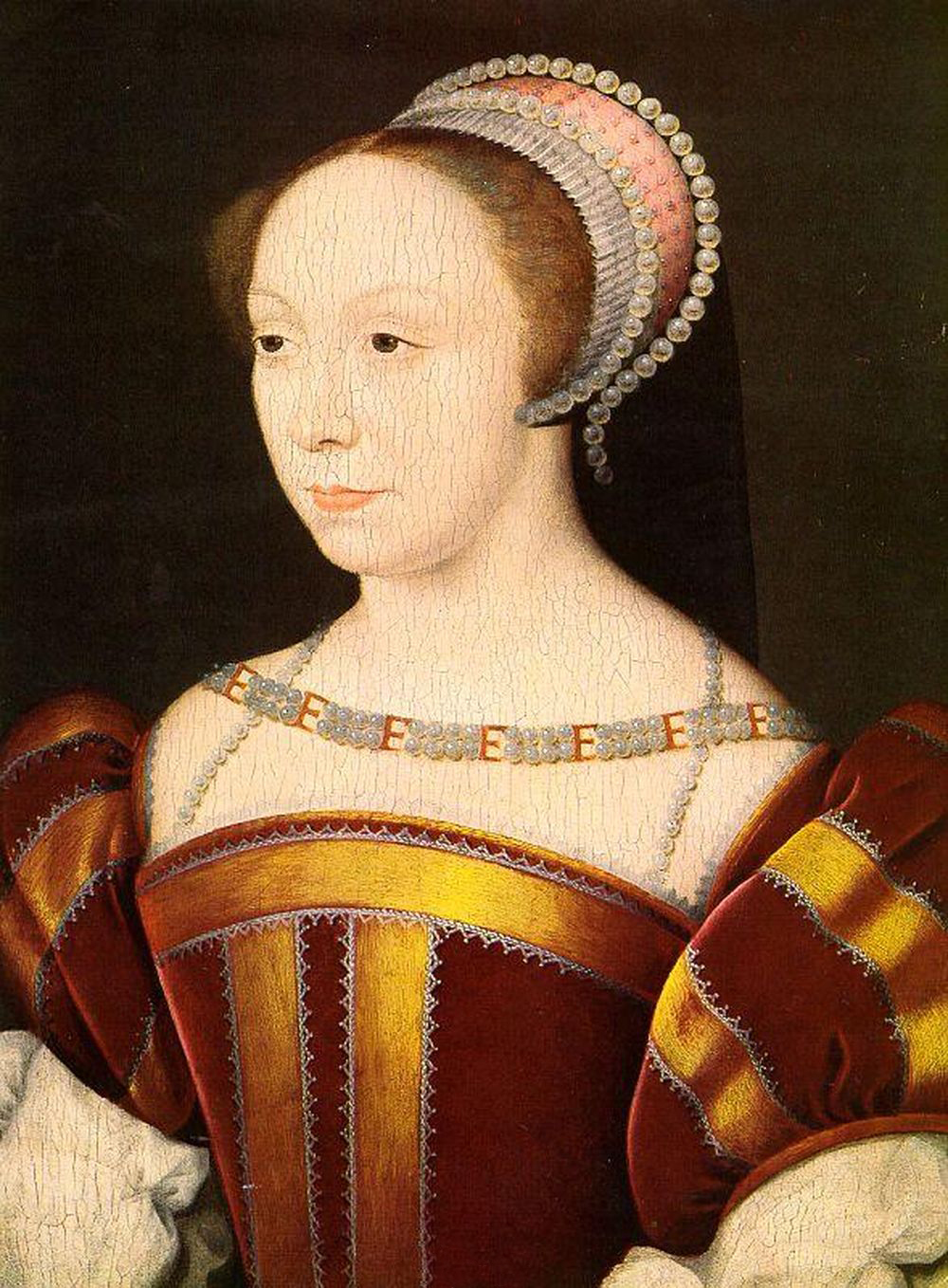

Suo jure Countess of Maulévrier
- Reign: 23 July 1531-14 October 1577
- Predecessor: Louis de Brézé
- Successor: Charles Robert
- Born: ca. 1518
- Died: 1577
- Spouse: Robert IV de La Marck
- Issue: 9
- Father: Louis de Brézé
- Mother: Diane de Poitiers

Françoise de Brézé (ca. 1518 – 1577), Suo jure Countess of Maulévrier, was a French noblewoman and courtier. She served as Première dame d'honneur to Queen Catherine de' Medici from 1547 until 1560 and was the regent of the Principality of Sedan from 1553 to 1559.

== Life ==
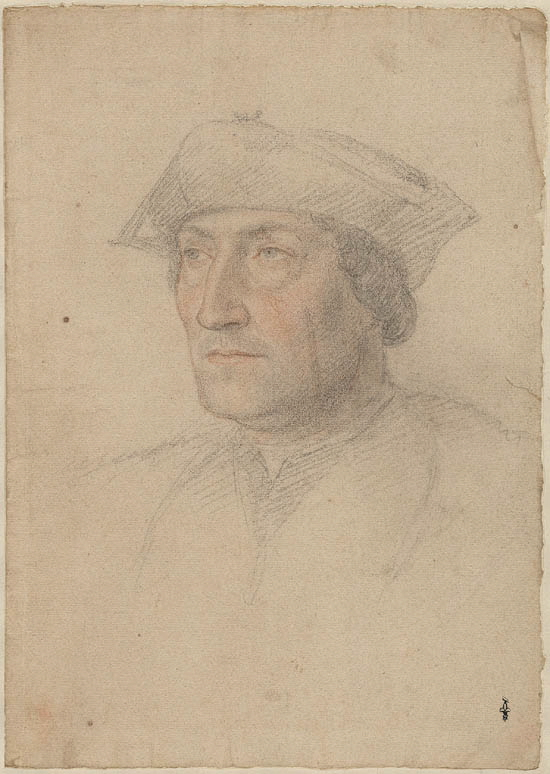
Françoise's father, Louis de Brézé.

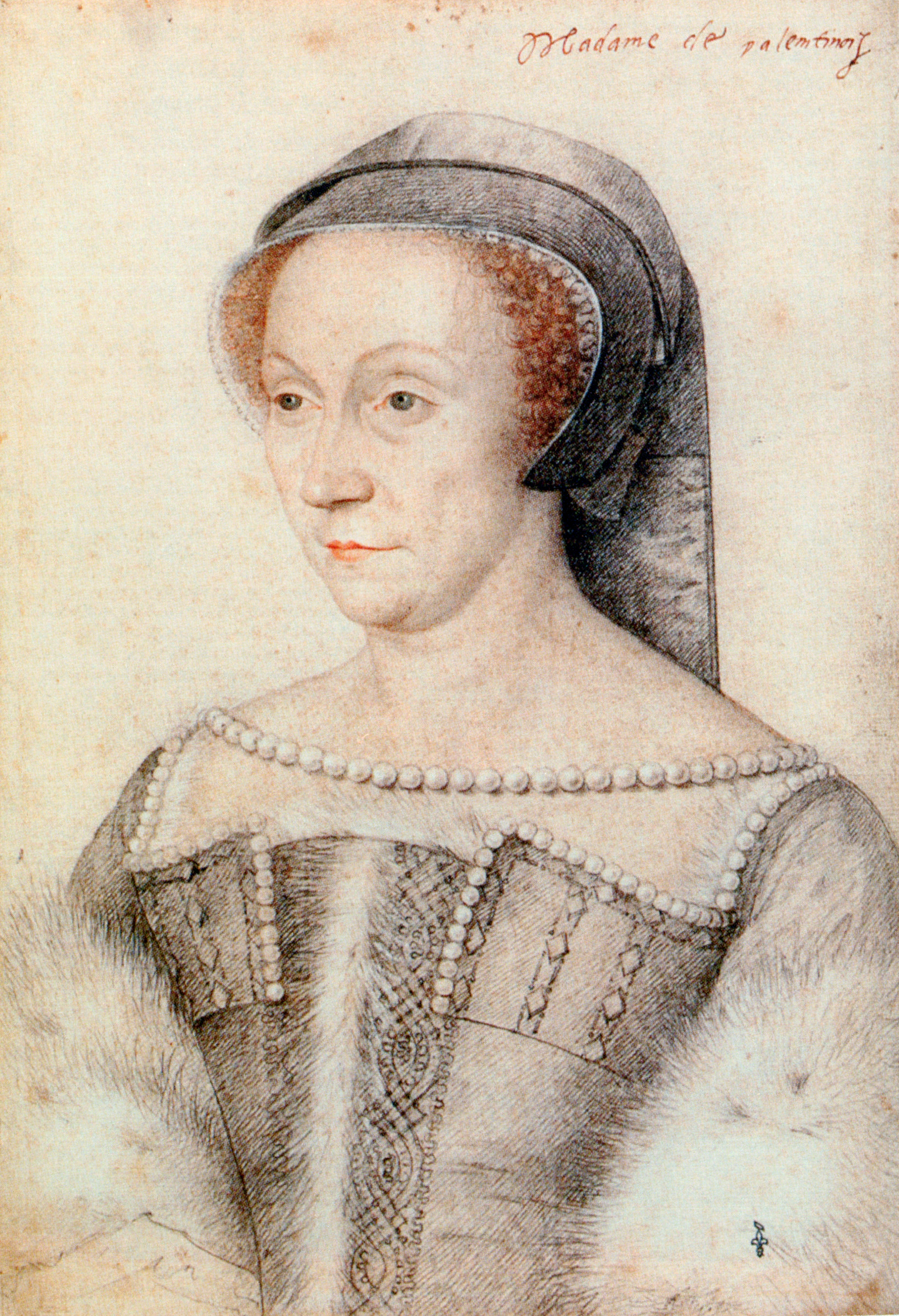
Françoise's mother, Diane de Poitiers.

=== Early life ===
Françoise de Brézé was born around 1518, the eldest child of Diane de Poitiers and Louis de Brézé, seigneur d'Anet, Count of Maulévrier. Françoise was descended from French royalty through her paternal grandmother, Charlotte de Brézé, an illegitimate daughter of Charles VII by his mistress Agnès Sorel. Both of Françoise's parents served as a courtiers to King Francis I of France.

In 1538, Françoise married Robert IV de La Marck, Prince of Sedan and Duke of Bouillon.

=== Court career ===
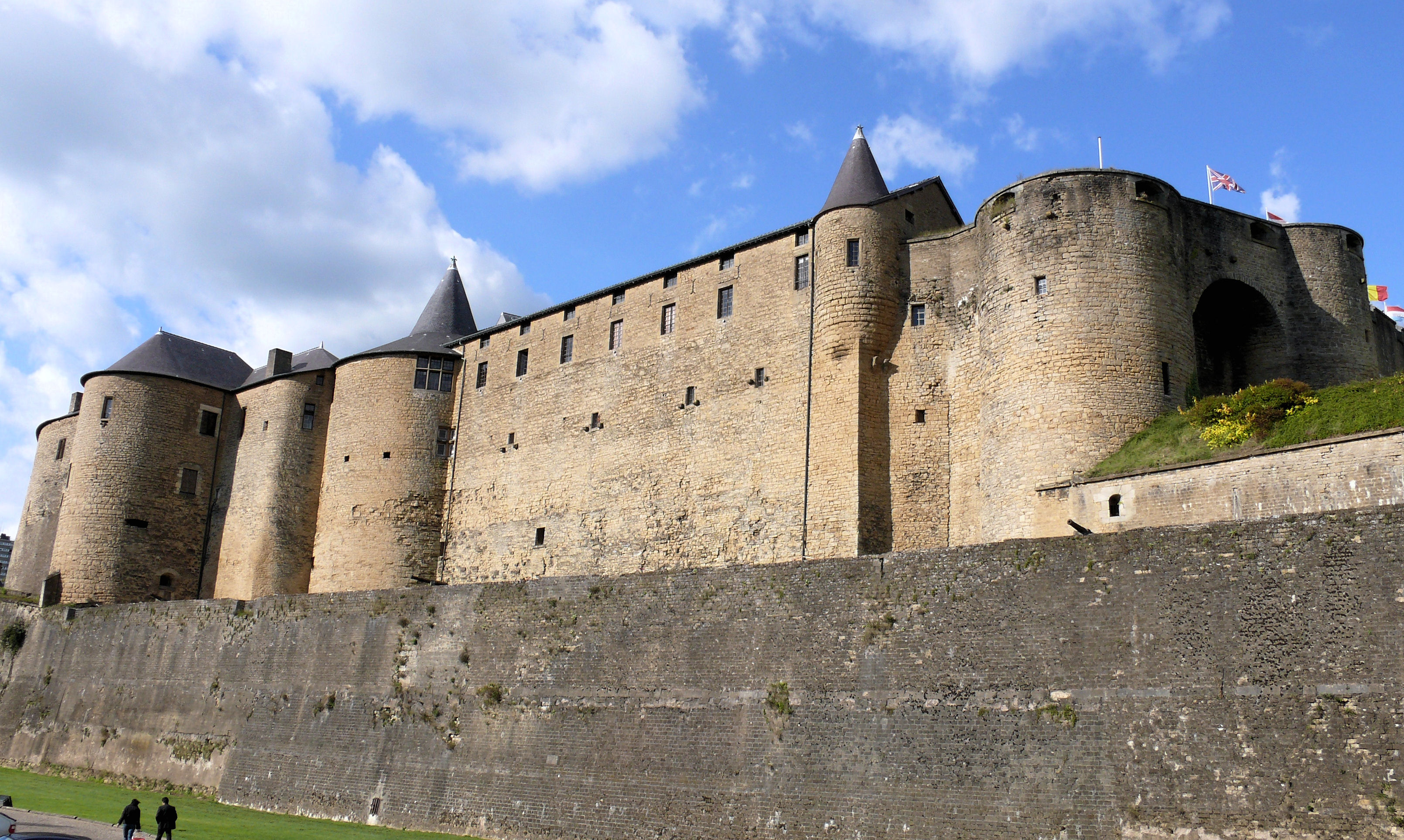
The Château de Sedan, seat of the Princes of Sedan.

Through her mother's high position as King Henry II's mistress, Françoise was appointed Première dame d'honneur to Queen Catherine de' Medici. Despite the fact that Catherine's chief attendant was the daughter of her husband's mistress, there appears to be no evidence that Queen Catherine personally disliked Françoise. As Première dame d'honneur, Françoise supervised the female courtiers, controlled the household's budget, ordered necessary purchases, organized the annual accounts and staff list, and introduced those seeking audience with the Queen.

From 1553, however, she would have in practice been absent from court, attending to her duties as regent of Sedan. Dame d'atour Madeleine Buonaiuti would have thus functioned as Première dame d'honneur, in accordance with court protocol. Françoise lost her office as Première dame d'honneur upon King Henry's death, but when Catherine became regent in 1560, Françoise was given a position as lady-in-waiting in the Queen Mother's household, which she kept until 1570.

=== Regent ===
During her husband's war imprisonment in the Siege of Metz (1553–56) and during the minority of their son Henri Robert (1556–59), Françoise acted as ruler of the Principality of Sedan. She reportedly kept the finances of Sedan in good accounts and initiated the development several much-needed public works. These included the Sedan Hospice as well as Neuve de l'Horloge, the first paved street in the city which still exists today.

In 1577, Françoise died aged approximately 59 years old. She was buried near her mother-in-law's tomb in the necropolis of the Counts of Dreux, Saint-Yved de Braine.

== Issue ==
She had the following children with Robert IV de La Marck:

- Henri Robert (1539–1574): Succeeded his father as Duke of Bouillon and Prince of Sedan. Married Françoise de Bourbon, daughter of Louis, Duke of Montpensier.
- Charles Robert (1541–1622): Succeeded his Mother as Count of Maulévrier.
- Christian: Died young.
- Antoinette (1542–1591), married Henri I de Montmorency
- Guillemette (1543–1544)
- Diane (born 1544): Named after her maternal grandmother. Married 1) Jacques de Clèves, duc de Nevers, 2) Henri de Clermont, 3) Jean Babou, Count of Sagonne.
- Guillemette (1545–1592): Married John III, Count of Ligny.
- Françoise (born 1547): Became an abbess.
- Catherine (born 1548): Married Jacques de Harlay, seigneur de Champvallon.

Court offices
Preceded by	Première dame d'honneur to the Queen of France; 1547–1559	Succeeded by Guillemette de Sarrebruck
Preceded by	Première dame d'honneur to Catherine de' Medici; 1547–1560	Succeeded by Jacqueline de Longwy
