= Pierre Quesnel =

French painter

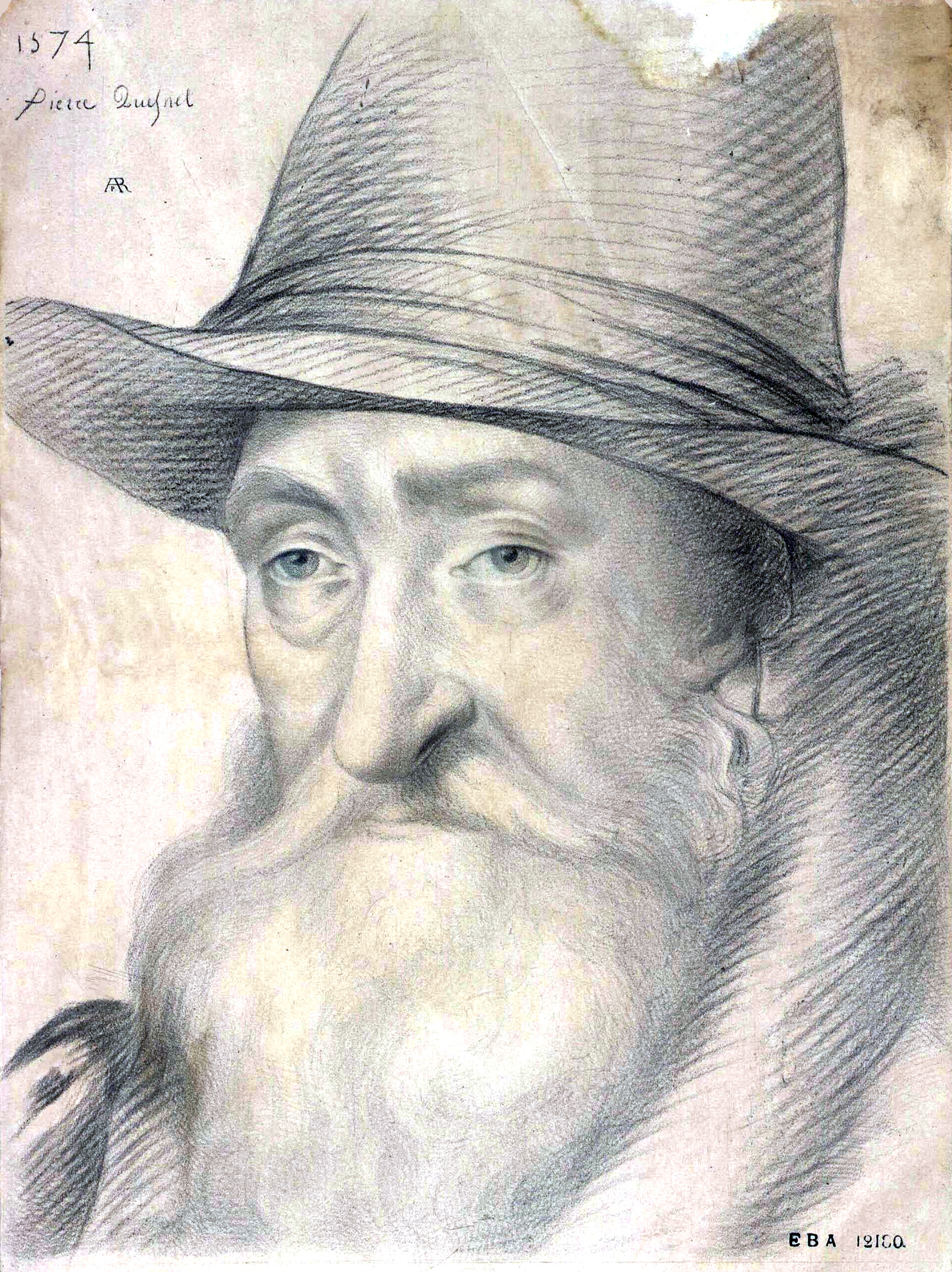
Pierre Quesnel, 1574

Pierre Quesnel (French pronunciation: [pjɛʁ kenɛl]; c. 1502 – c. 1580) was a 16th-century French artist who worked in Scotland, before returning to Paris with his family after the death of James V of Scotland.

== Career ==
Pierre Quesnel worked in Scotland for Mary of Guise and James V. He is listed as an usher in Guise's household and is identified as the "queen's painter" in the Scottish Treasurer's Accounts. Artists at the French court were sometimes given positions as ushers or valets. Pierre Quesnel, described as "Perys the uscher", was given £10 at the time of Mary of Guise's coronation and a gift of clothing in June 1541. According to an inscription on the back of a portrait of his son Nicholas, he married Madeleine Digby in Scotland, and his eldest son the painter François Quesnel was born in Edinburgh.

Other French craftsmen working on the Scottish royal palaces include the woodcarver and metal-worker Andrew Mansioun and the mason Nicolas Roy. Pierre Quesnel was mentioned in the household accounts of Mary of Guise after the death of James V, but seems to have returned to France with his family around the year 1544. His sons Nicolas and Jacques Quesnel were also artists, and a number of chalk portraits by François and Nicolas survive. Jacques's work is known only through a single drawing, Time slaying Youth.

== Works ==
Pierre Quesnel's work is also mostly lost, excepting an Architectural Study after Jacques Androuet du Cerceau, preserved at the École nationale supérieure des Beaux-Arts in Paris, and another drawing, a view called Château of Sées. The Abbé de Marolles, a seventeenth-century French writer, recorded Pierre in verse as the designer of a stained-glass window for the Eglise des Augustins in Paris in 1557, with subject, Ascension of Christ with Portraits of Henri II and Catherine de Medici, now destroyed. Marolles also stated that Pierre and his son François designed tapestries

The historian Andrea Thomas argued from Pierre's small salary as an usher in Scotland that he was a decorative painter rather a portrait artist.

In November 1541, Mary of Guise's mother, Antoinette de Bourbon, wrote to thank her daughter for what may have been a portrait miniature James V had sent to her (brought to Joinville by Mahaut des Essartz), which she called a "diamond", and could have been painted from life:

pour bien faire mes tres humbles mersimens au Roy du dyament quy luy a pleu m'envoyer. Je vous repons se m'a este present bien agreable et que j'ayme aultant qu'yl est possible; il sera garde toute ma vye pour l'onneur de luy. Je l'ay trouve sy beau sa painture que sy savyes combien je l'ayme je peur vous en series jallouse.

And to make my very humble thanks to the King for the "diamond" he sent me. I tell you it is most agreeable and I hold it in highest esteem, it will be kept carefully all my life for his honour. I find his picture so beautiful that if it was known how much, I fear that you would be jealous.

In 1570, a contract was made by Pierre and his son François Quesnel for the decoration of lodgings for the Bishop of Évreux at the Bois de Vincennes. The devis or specification details a white background in distemper and oil paints, for heraldry and inscriptions on freizes and above chimneys, with grotesque patterns.

Although these works are destroyed, there is a portrait of Pierre himself made by Nicolas or François in 1574. The 2010 paintwork of the restored palace at Stirling Castle was designed and created with the story of Pierre Quesnel in mind.

== Footnotes ==
Preceded by Mynours, Inglis payntour	Painter at the Scottish royal court 1538–1544	Succeeded by Arnold Bronckhorst
