= Jacques de Harlay =

Jacques de Harlay, lord of Champvallon or Chanvallon (? - 3 April 1630) was a French nobleman. He was a son of Louis de Harlay, Baron of Montglas and his wife Louise de Carre. His coat of arms was "D’argent à deux pals de sable".

He is most notable as a lover of Margaret of Valois - their love affair with her was immortalised by poems in which she called him her "handsome sun" ("beau soleil"). He was Grand Squire (Grand écuyer) to her brother Francis, Duke of Anjou.

== Marriage and issue ==
On 20 August 1582, he married Catherine de La Marck, lady of Bréval (born 1548), daughter of Robert IV de La Marck and Françoise de Brézé (the latter being daughter of Louis de Brézé). They had at least two children, Achille and François.
