= Mahaut des Essartz =

French courtier

Mahaut des Essartz or Mahanet des Essarts was a French courtier in the service of Mary of Guise and Mary, Queen of Scots. She taught the French language to the Scottish queen.

== Career ==
She was a daughter of Antoine des Essarts, sieur de Saint-Chéron (Marne). Her first husband was Jacques de Chaumont, sieur d'Ésguilly (died 1531). They had two children, Leonard and Antoine. She married secondly Charles de la Haye, sieur de Curel, a master of household to Mary of Guise, and she was known as "Madame de Curel" and also as "Mademoiselle de Curel" according to the custom of the time. Her position at the Scottish court was a "Dame d'honneur", a gentlewoman at court.

Mahaut was involved in textile crafts and embroidery with silver and gold thread. She was present in Scotland at the time of the coronation of Mary of Guise as Queen Consort in 1540, and was involved in the purchase of cloth of gold for her outfit.

Mahaut visited France and the Duchess of Guise in 1541, possibly bringing a portrait of James V to Joinville (5km from Curel). The Duchess wrote to Mary of Guise that she frequently summoned Mahaut to tell her stories of the Scottish court.

At this time the painter Pierre Quesnel was a resident at the Scottish court, as an usher of Mary of Guise, and was recorded at the Queen's painter in accounts of decorative work at Falkland Palace. He may have made the king's portrait sent to the Duchess.

In 1546, Mahaut bought a property in France, a part of the "seigneurie de Champ-au-Roi" (Champ-sur-Barse, Aube) from Antoinette d'Amboise, the wife of Louis de Luxembourg, comte de Roussy, for 2,475 livre tournois.

When Mary, Queen of Scots was taken to France in 1548, Mahaut found a barber to heal the arm of Anne Fleming, a daughter of Janet Stewart, Lady Fleming. The Duchess of Guise hoped that "Mademoyselle de Curel" and her husband would be Queen Mary's attendants as well as the governess Lady Fleming, and that Mahaut would teach the young queen to speak good French and the other accomplishments in which she excelled.

Mahaut was not appointed chief governess but became a dame d'atours to Queen Mary. She resigned this post in 1553 after having some disagreements with Mary's governess Françoise de Paroy. Her position in Mary's household was filled by Guyonne de Breüil. Mahaut des Essartz continued to receive a pension from Mary's household list.

She was still a landowner at Curel in 1572, and is said to have joined the French court with Madeleine of Savoy.

== Family ==
Her son, Antoine de Chaumont (died 1585), was later involved in the administration of Queen Mary's French estates, and Leonard de Chaumont (died 1573) was a master of Mary's French household in the 1550s, and master of the household of Claude, Duke of Aumale in 1565 at Joinville where he was a godfather to Marie d'Aumalle.
