= Guillemette de Sarrebruck =

French court official (1490–1571)

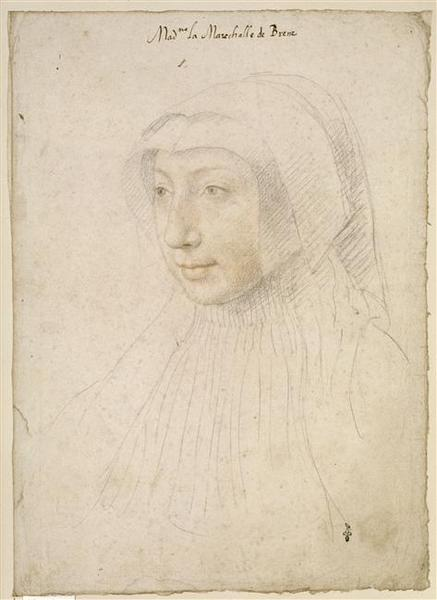
Portrait of Guillemette de Sarrebruck by Jean Clouet, 1537

Guillemette de Sarrebruck (c. 1490–1571) was a French court official. She served as Governess of the Children of France, and as the Première dame d'honneur to the queen of France, Mary Stuart. She had the title comtesse de Braine de jure after 1525, when she inherited the County of Braine from her childless brother.

== Life ==
Guillemette de Sarrebruck was the daughter of Robert II de Sarrebruck-Commercy and Marie d'Amboise. She married Robert III de La Marck in 1510, with whom she had a son, Robert IV de La Marck (1512–1556), Duke of Bouillon, Prince of Sedan and Marshal of France.

=== Court career ===
Guillemette de Sarrebruck had a long career at the royal court of France. She served as dame or dame d'honneur (lady-in-waiting) to three queens of France: Anne de Bretagne, Eleanor of Austria and Catherine de Médici.

She served as Governess of the Children of France to the children of Francis I.

She was appointed to the position of head lady-in-waiting or Première dame d'honneur to Mary, Queen of Scots, when Mary became queen of France. She was suggested as the most suitable to the position early on, but her appointment was delayed for a while since the queen's mother Mary of Guise wished to appoint a Scottish woman. As Première dame d'honneur, she was the manager of the 27 ladies-in-waiting of Mary, with the Guyonne de Breüil as her closest deputy as Dame d'atours.

Her tenure as Première dame d'honneur ended when Mary was widowed and returned to Scotland in 1561, when most of her French staff chose to remain in France.

She died on 20 September 1571 and was buried at the Abbey of Saint-Yved de Braine. As Countess of Braine or Brenne in her own right she was sometimes called "Madame de Brenne" or "Madame de Brien".

== Sources ==
- Saulnier, V.L. (1955). "L'Auteur du Forimont en Prose Imprimé: Girard Moët de Pommesson". Bibliothèque d'Humanisme et Renaissance (in French). 17 (2): 207–217.
- Alain Sartelet, La Principauté de Sedan, Éditions Terres Ardennaises, 1991, 180 p. (ISBN 2-905339-17-9), p. 11.

Court offices
| Preceded by Charlotte Gouffier de Boisy | Governess of the Children of France | Succeeded by Françoise d'Humières |
| Preceded by Françoise de Brézé | Première dame d'honneur to the Queen of France; 1559–1560 | Succeeded by Madeleine of Savoy |
