= Nicolas Roy (mason) =

French stonemason

Nicolas Roy was a French stonemason who worked in Scotland for James V and his second wife Mary of Guise.

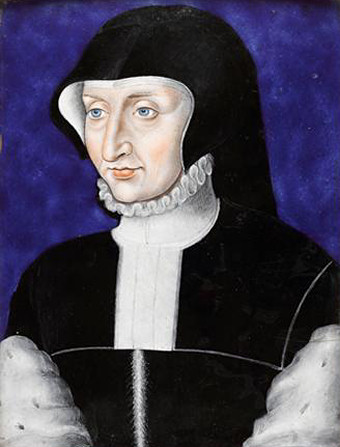
Antoinette of Bourbon sent French stonemasons to Scotland to give her daughter's palaces a makeover

== Career ==
Nicolas Roy may have been the leader of the group of stonemasons recruited by Antoinette of Bourbon, Duchess of Guise, the mother of Mary of Guise. The Duchess wrote that she had found a mason with a high reputation who promised to go Scotland and bring a good companion. The masons travelled to Scotland via Paris. The Duchess also sent expert miners to look for Scottish gold. Mary of Guise wrote to her mother that she was pleased with the masons.

The miners were looked after by the goldsmith John Mosman and sent to Crawford Moor escorted by a messenger to translate for them until they learnt the Scots language.

He was appointed master mason to the king on 22 April 1539 with an annual fee of £6-13-4d over and above any wages for mason work to be paid by the Master of Work, John Scrimgeour. Nicolas Roy (and his wife) were later listed in a household roll of Mary of Guise, and mentioned in her household books. He made some alterations and repairs for Mary of Guise and her infant daughter Mary, Queen of Scots, at Stirling Castle in 1544. The brief account written in French mentions lime for repairing the wall of the park and two carpenters who made wheelbarrows.

It is not clear if Etienne Roy, a page or "chamber child" in the household of Mary, Queen of Scots, was a relation. Other French craftsmen working at the Scottish royal palaces include the woodcarver and metal-worker Andrew Mansioun and the painter Pierre Quesnel. A French mason Jean Roytell worked on the tomb of Regent Moray with Murdoch Walker.

== Falkland Palace ==
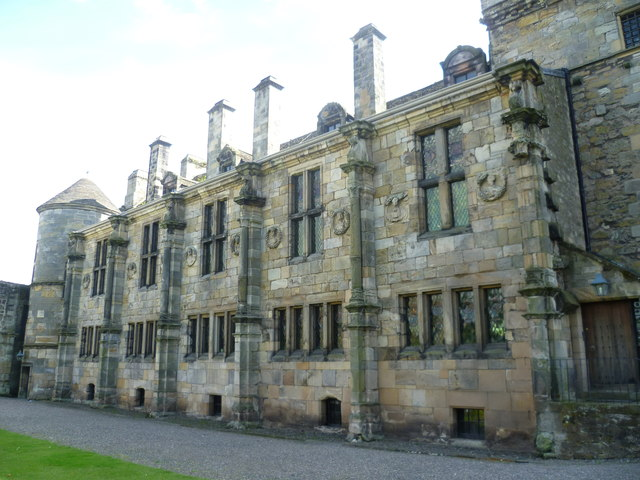
Carefully executed stonework in the "François Ier" style at Falkland Palace is the work of Nicolas Roy and his companions.

Nicolas Roy is particularly associated with the renaissance style carvings at Falkland Palace. One wage payment calls Roy the principal stonemason at Falkland Palace, in Latin; Nicholio Roy, Gallico, latimo principali in palatio de Falkland. His name appears in the records for building Falkland Palace from June 1539 onwards. He was paid 21 shillings weekly and his three colleagues or "servitours" received the same. There is also a payment in the Treasurer's Accounts for the wages of the "French maister maison in Falkland" since his arrival in Scotland on 20 April 1539 to the end of August 1540.

At this time, James V was building and converting his father's lodgings at Falkland into a palace in French renaissance style. The palace effectively belonged to Mary of Guise as part of her jointure. The accounts do not specify exactly what work Nicolas Roy and his workshop undertook, but they may have carved the portrait medallions or roundels that decorate the internal façades of the courtyard. A sculptor known as Peter Flemishman made the statues of saints for the niches on the entrance façade.

During the works at Falkland, the French masons made two excursions to St Andrews to advise on the building of a new college under the patronage of Cardinal David Beaton.

Another French stonemason, Moyse or Mogin Martin, first employed at Dunbar Castle by the Duke of Albany, worked at Falkland until his death in March 1538. His son also called Moyse Martin continued to work at Falkland. The elder Moyse Martin travelled to France with James V in 1536 and perhaps gained inspiration for the royal works in Scotland at this time.
