= Michel Lasne =

French engraver and collector

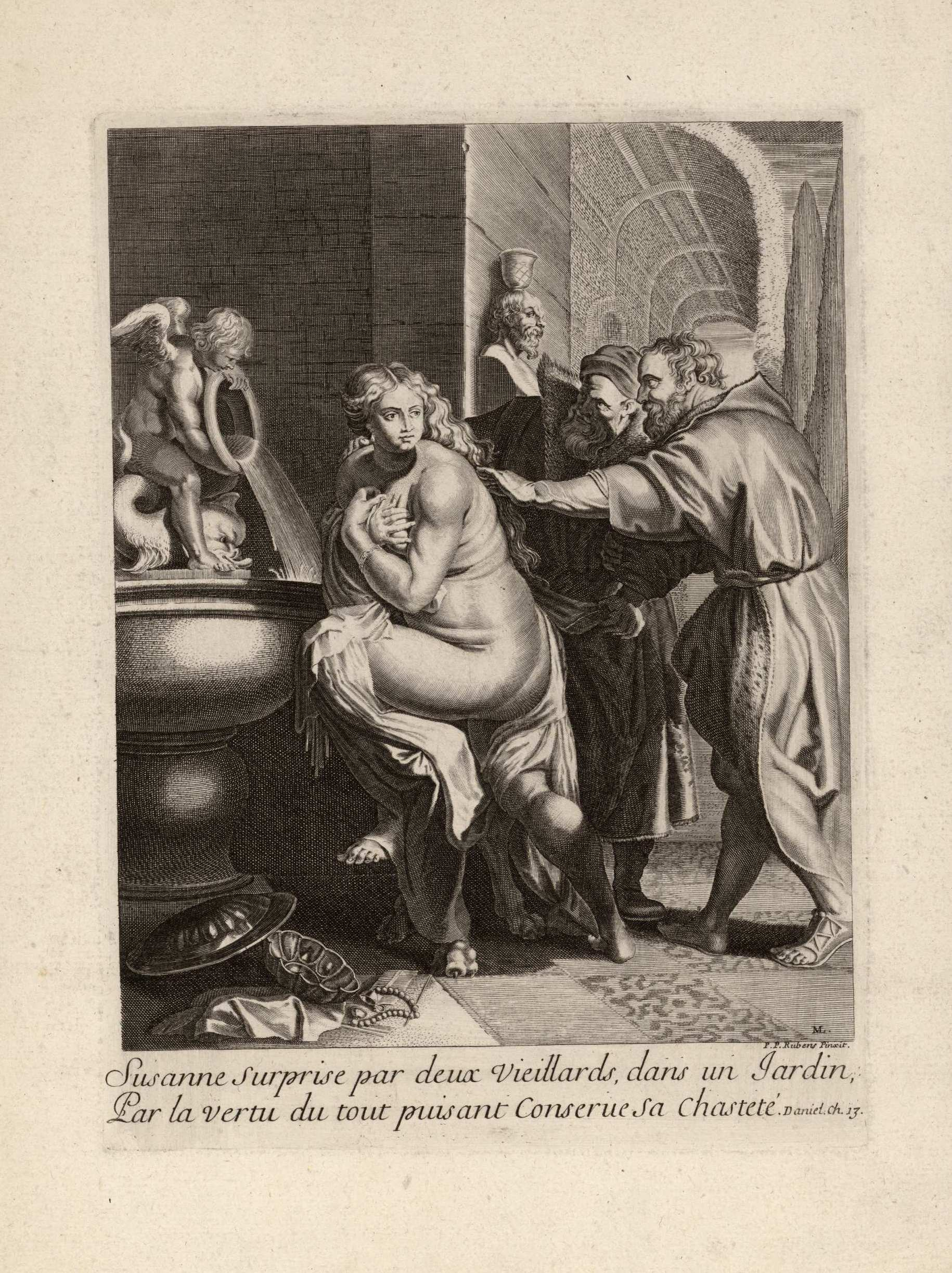
Susanna and the Elders by Michel Lasne, after Peter Paul Rubens, ca. 1617-18

Michel Lasne (Caen, ca. 1590–4 December 1667, Paris), was a French engraver, draughtsman and collector.

Lasne was born in Caen and was the son of a goldsmith. He was a member of the Guild of Saint Luke in Antwerp for 1617–18, and probably worked under the direction of Peter Paul Rubens and Anthony van Dyck. At that time he made an engraving of Rubens's now-lost Susanna and the Elders, which contains a dedication from Rubens to the Dutch humanist Anna Roemers Visscher. Lasne was in Paris by 1621, and in 1633 he became the official engraver for King Louis XIII. In France, Lasne engraved a number of portraits. There are at least 759 prints by Lasne, including 13 portraits of King Louis XIII and 10 of his wife, Anne of Austria. He made reproductive engravings after the French painters Philippe de Champaigne, Daniel Dumonstier, Simon Vouet, and Charles Le Brun; the Italian painters Paolo Veronese, Francesco Albani, and Titian; and the Spanish painter Jusepe de Ribera.
