= Guyonne de Breüil =

Guyonne de Breüil (died after 1562), was a French lady-in-waiting at the court of Mary, Queen of Scots in France and Scotland.

She served as the Dame d'atours of queen Mary between 1553 and 1562. She was married to Jean de Beaucaire, who was also a courtier in service of Mary, as well as their daughter Marie de Beaucaire .

== Early life ==
Guyonne de Breüil was a daughter of Henri Lyonnet de Breil, seigneur de Paluau and Anne de Baudreuil.

In 1527 she married Jean de Beaucaire, sieur de Puyguillon or Puiguillon (1505–1578). The Château du Puy-Guillon is at Vernusse in the Auvergne. Gilbert de Beaucaire, sieur de Puigillon, (her brother or father-in-law), was involved in the negotiations for the marriage of James V of Scotland and Mary of Guise in 1538. He was sent to ask Francis I of France to make good his promises of a dowry for Mary of Guise. Jean de Beaucaire is said to have joined the household of the Duke of Albany and Anne de la Tour as a young man.

== Court career ==
In June 1552, the Cardinal of Lorraine sent Jean de Beaucaire, Sieur de Puyguillon, to Scotland to address the financial affairs of Mary of Guise. He became one of masters of Mary, Queen of Scots' household, retiring in 1574.

Guyonne de Breüil herself was appointed to the post of Dame d'atours (Lady of the Bedchamber) to Mary, Queen of Scots in succession to Mahaut des Essartz, Dame de Curel, in 1553, and remained for about a decade. In 1555, her wage was 300 Livres tournois and her husband was paid 400 with other sums and a pension. She was provided with three horses and a horseman.

In September 1561 she and her spouse both came to Scotland with Mary, Queen of Scots. In 1562, the sieur de Puyguillon compiled a household roll and diet for the household, which was published in 1824 by Thomas Thomson as the Menu de la Maison de la Royne faict par Mons, de Pinguillon, MDLXII. The manuscript is held by the National Records of Scotland.

The couple returned to France for a visit in August 1562 with their son. Her husband, bringing letters from Mary, was a given a passport to come to London and meet Elizabeth I. They were accompanied by Mademoiselle de Fonte-Pertuis and two more of Mary's gentlewomen. The passport issued at Berwick-upon-Tweed mentions their 14 mounted servants and 12 footmen, and the colours and sizes of their horses and mares, measured in "handfuls".

Their companion, Suzanne Constant, Mademoiselle de Fontpertuis, was one of the queen's maidens, she received bedlinen with the queen's four Maries in 1561, dined with them, and was given the "second dule" mourning clothes. She was given a crimson silk chamlet gown with gold embroidery to take back with her to France in August 1562, probably for her marriage to Jean Hurault, seigneur de Veuil. Her name appears in the treasurer's accounts as "Simpartew" or "Fimpartew".

A menu was drawn up for the royal household in Scotland just before they left, specifying meals and allowances. The document noted that the budget for the table for the queen's gentlewomen could be reduced following the departure of "Pinguillon et Fontpertuis".

== Children ==
Guyonne de Breüil's daughter Marie de Beaucaire (1535–1613), was also a member of Mary's household in France. According to Pierre de Bourdeille, seigneur de Brantôme, she was a great favourite of Mary and was then known as "Mademoiselle de Villemontays". She married Sébastien, Duke of Penthièvre in 1556, a master of Mary's household. He came to Scotland as a soldier during the siege of Leith in 1560 and was known as "Martigues" from his French title. He returned to Scotland in April 1562 to request that Mary be the godmother of their daughter, Marie (1562–1623). She married Philippe Emmanuel, Duke of Mercœur in July 1579. In 1566 Mary, Queen of Scots, made a will leaving some of her jewellery to the daughter of Martigues including a necklace with rubies, diamonds and pearls, a cottoire of pearls, a pearl headdress, and a pearl necklace.

Another daughter of Guyonne de Breüil, Françoise de Beaucaire, married a Spanish aristocrat, Pierre de Salzedo. Another daughter, Maquize de Beaucaire (1533–1609) was a nun and Abbess of Saint Georges, Rennes.

Court offices
Preceded by Madeleine Buonaiuti	Dame d'atour to the Queen of France; 1559–1561	Succeeded by Margaret de La Marck-Arenberg
