= Braine, Aisne =

Braine
- Commune
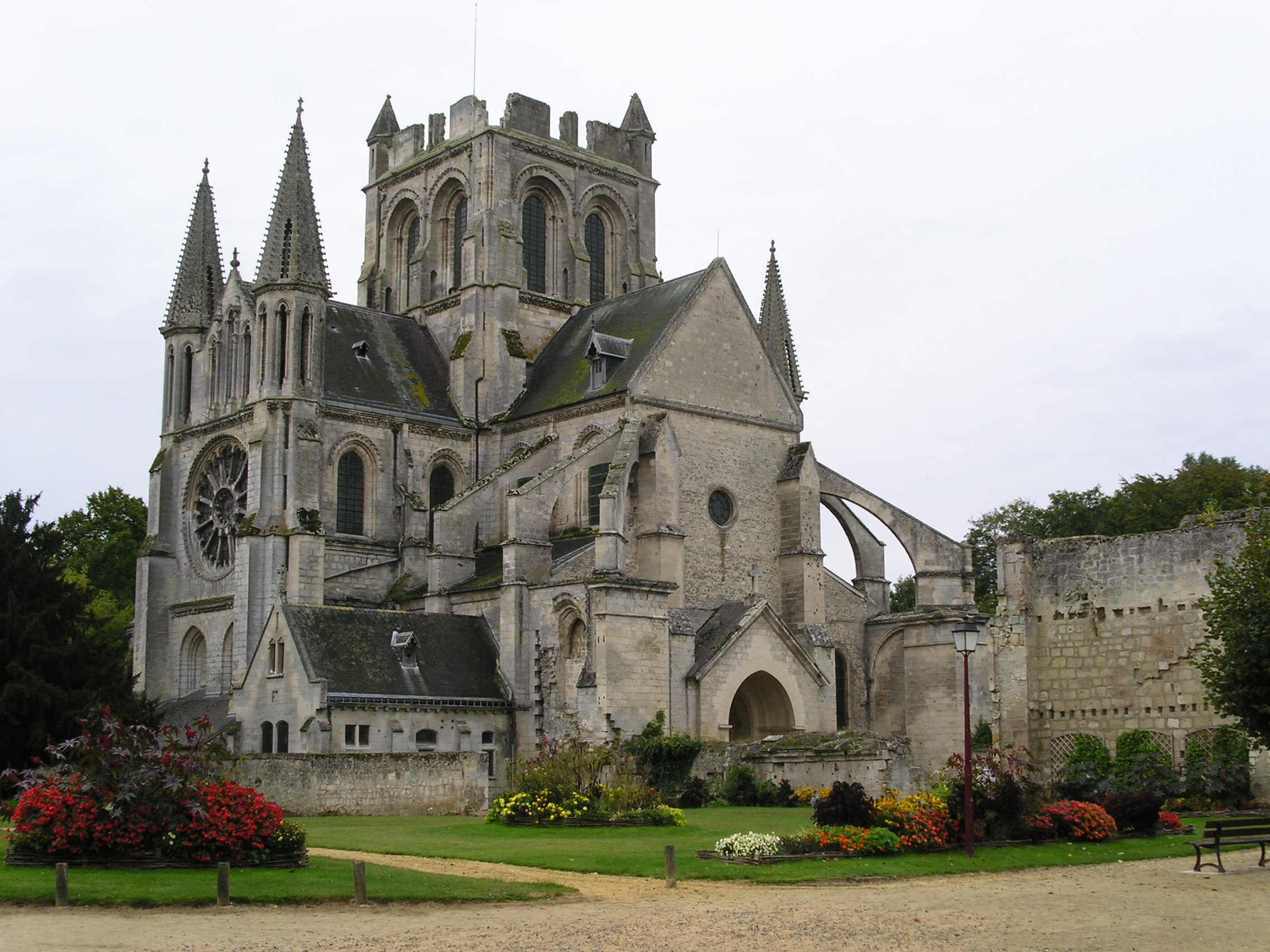
- Saint-Yved de Braine

- Coat of arms
- Location of Braine
- Location within France Location within Hauts-de-France
- Coordinates: 49°20′30″N 3°31′55″E
- Country: France
- Region: Hauts-de-France
- Department: Aisne
- Arrondissement: Soissons
- Canton: Fère-en-Tardenois
- Intercommunality: Val de l'Aisne

Government
  - Mayor (2026–32): François Rampelberg
- Area^{1}: 11.61 km^{2} (4.48 sq mi)
- Elevation: 54 m (177 ft)
- Highest elevation: 169 m (554 ft)
- Lowest elevation: 48 m (157 ft)
- Population (2023): 2,248
  - Density: 193.6/km^{2} (501.5/sq mi)
- Time zone: UTC+01:00 (CET)
  - Summer (DST): UTC+02:00 (CEST)
- INSEE/Postal code: 02110 /02220
- ^{1} French Land Register data, which excludes lakes, ponds, glaciers > 1 km^{2} (0.386 sq mi or 247 acres) and river estuaries.

Braine (French pronunciation: [bʁɛn]) is a commune in the department of Aisne in Hauts-de-France in northern France.

== History ==
Braine existed long before the year 561, when it was mentioned as a royal palace (Königspfalz) of Neustrian King Chlotar I.

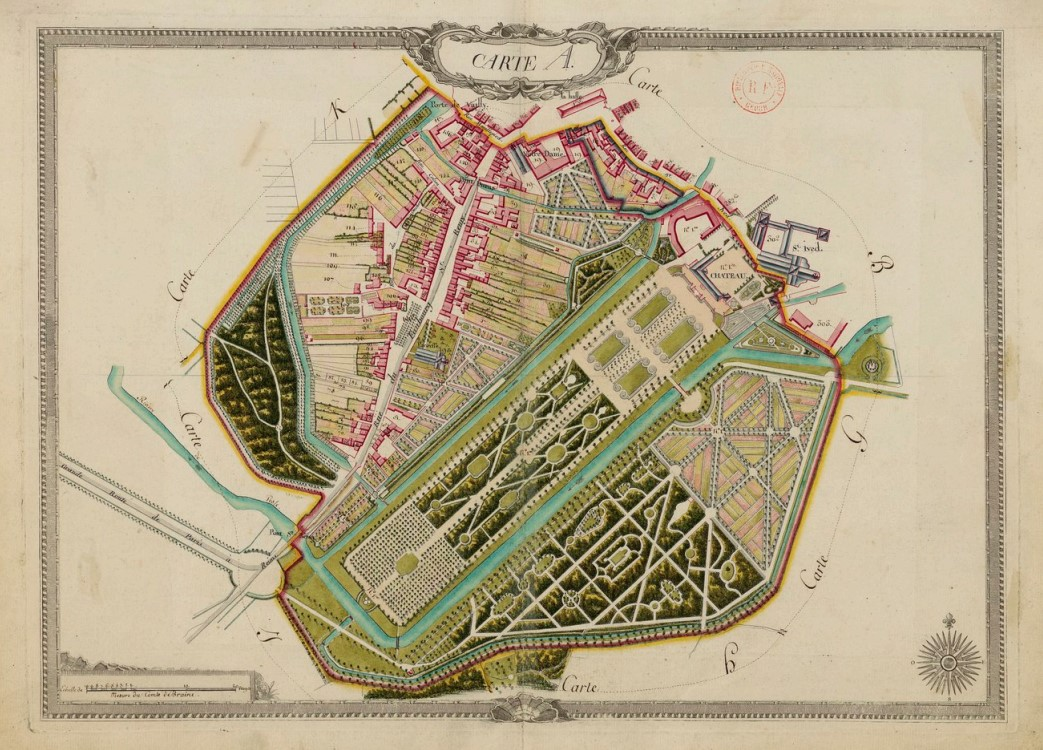
Plan of the Château de Braine and its gardens by André Le Nôtre

In the 18th century, the counts of Egmont-Pignatelli spent their summers at the Château de Braine, which was known for its gardens by André Le Nôtre. Countess Septimanie d'Egmont a French salonist who invited guests like Rousseau to visit the château. After the French Revolution, the château was demolished.

== Population ==
Historical population
Year	Pop.	±% p.a.
1968	1,722	—
1975	1,943	+1.74%
1982	1,952	+0.07%
1990	2,090	+0.86%
1999	2,069	−0.11%
2007	2,105	+0.22%
2012	2,231	+1.17%
2017	2,213	−0.16%
2023	2,248	+0.26%
Source: INSEE

== See also ==
- Communes of the Aisne department
