= A34 autoroute =

Road in France

A34 autoroute

Route information
- Part of E44 / E46 / E420
- Maintained by SANEF and DIR Est
- Length: 98 km (61 mi)
- Existed: 1973–present

Major junctions
- North end: E44 / E46 / N 43 in Sedan

- E44 / E46 / N 43 in Charleville-Mézières; E44 / E420 / A 304 in La Francheville; E46 / E420 / N 51 in Rethel and Lavannes; A 344 in Reims

- South end: E17 / E46 / E50 / A 4 in Taissy

Location
- Country: France

Highway system
- Roads in France; Autoroutes; Routes nationales

Autoroute A34 is a toll free motorway in northeastern France, approximately 98 kilometres (61 mi) long. It is an upgrade of the N43 and N51. It links Sedan with Reims. It forms part of European routes E44 and E46.

== Lists of exits and junctions ==
Region	Department	Junction	Destinations	Notes
E44 / E46 / N 43 becomes E44 / E46 / A 34
Grand Est	Ardennes	5 : Donchery	Donchery	
Grand Est	Ardennes	6 : Vivier-au-Court	Vrigne-aux-Bois, Vivier-au-Court	
Grand Est	Ardennes	7 : Lumes	Lumes	
Grand Est	Ardennes	8 : Villers-Semeuse	Flize, Les Ayvelles, Villers-Semeuse, Centre Commercial Villers-Semeuse	
Grand Est	Ardennes	RN 43 - A34 + 9 : Moulin Leblanc	Nouzonville, Charleville-Mézières - centre, Charleville-Mézières - Bois Fortant	
Grand Est	Ardennes	RN 43 - A34 + 9 : Moulin Leblanc	Parc Technologique	
Grand Est	Ardennes	10 : La Francheville	La Francheville	
Grand Est	Ardennes	A304 - A34	Bruxelles, Charleroi, Cambrai, Maubeuge	
Grand Est	Ardennes	E44 / E46 / A 34 becomes E46 / A 34		
Grand Est	Ardennes	11 : Boulzicourt	Flize, Boulzicourt, Saint-Pierre-sur-Vence	Entry and exit from Reims
Grand Est	Ardennes	12 : Yvernaumont	Guignicourt-sur-Vence, Yvernaumont	
Grand Est	Ardennes	13 : Poix-Terron	Châlons-en-Champagne, Vouziers, Poix-Terron	
Grand Est	Ardennes	14 : Woinic	Faissault, Saulces-Monclin	
Grand Est	Ardennes	14 : Woinic	Aire des Ardennes - Woinic	
Grand Est	Ardennes	E46 / A 34 becomes E46 / N 51		
Grand Est	Ardennes	E46 / N 51 becomes again E46 / A 34		
Grand Est	Marne	25 : Witry-lès-Reims	Lille (A26), Reims - nord, Witry-lès-Reims	
Grand Est	Marne	27 : Croix-Blandin	Châlons-en-Champagne par RD, Reims - est, Z. A. C. Croix-Blandin	
Grand Est	Marne	E46 / A 34 becomes E46 / N 244		
Grand Est	Marne	A344 - RN 244 & A34 + 29 : Cormontreuil	Reims - centre, Champagne-Ardenne TGV station	
Grand Est	Marne	A344 - RN 244 & A34 + 29 : Cormontreuil	Troyes, Châlons-en-Champagne (A26), Paris, Metz, Nancy, Reims - sud (A4)	
Grand Est	Marne	A344 - RN 244 & A34 + 29 : Cormontreuil	Cormontreuil	
Grand Est	Marne	E46 / N 244 becomes again E46 / A 34		
Grand Est	Marne	Péage de Taissy		
Grand Est	Marne	A4 - A34	Paris, Lille (A26), Reims - sud	
Grand Est	Marne	A4 - A34	Lyon, Troyes (A26), Metz, Nancy (A31), Châlons-en-Champagne	
1.000 mi = 1.609 km; 1.000 km = 0.621 mi

== Village étape ==
The Autoroute is served by the following two Village étapes, Launois-sur-Vence and Poix-Terron.
