= Montigny-sur-Vence =

- Commune
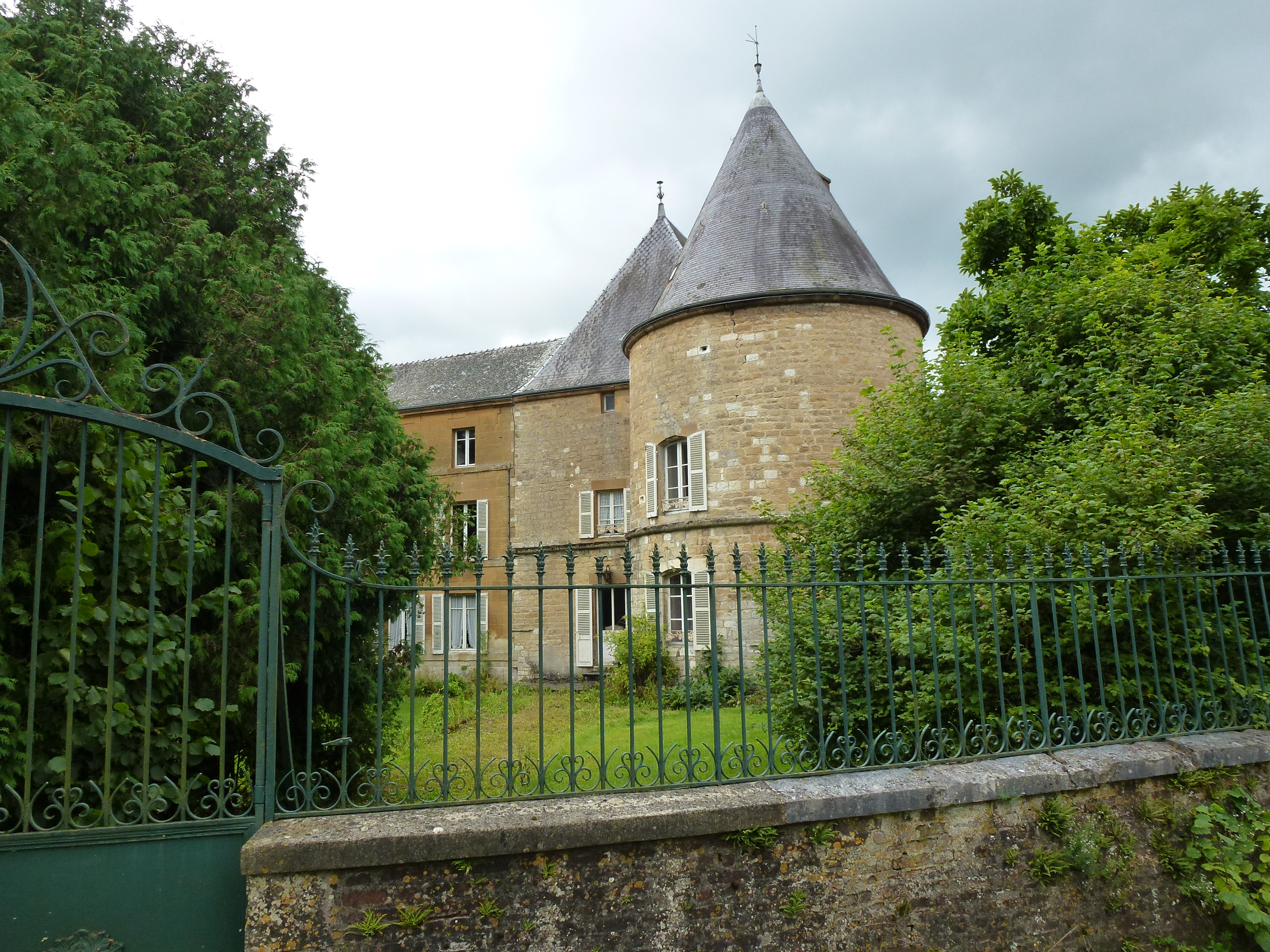
- Chateau

- Coat of arms
- Location of Montigny-sur-Vence
- Location within France Location within Grand Est
- Coordinates: 49°38′50″N 4°37′05″E
- Country: France
- Region: Grand Est
- Department: Ardennes
- Arrondissement: Charleville-Mézières
- Canton: Nouvion-sur-Meuse
- Intercommunality: Crêtes Préardennaises

Government
  - Mayor (2020–2026): Eric Delcourt
- Area^{1}: 8.24 km^{2} (3.18 sq mi)
- Population (2023): 211
  - Density: 25.6/km^{2} (66.3/sq mi)
- Time zone: UTC+01:00 (CET)
  - Summer (DST): UTC+02:00 (CEST)
- INSEE/Postal code: 08305 /08430
- ^{1} French Land Register data, which excludes lakes, ponds, glaciers > 1 km^{2} (0.386 sq mi or 247 acres) and river estuaries.

Montigny-sur-Vence (French pronunciation: [mɔ̃tiɲi syʁ vɑ̃s]) is a commune in the Ardennes department in northern France. It lies on the river Vence.

== Population ==
Historical population
| Year | Pop. | ±% p.a. |
|---|---|---|
| 1968 | 152 | — |
| 1975 | 134 | −1.78% |
| 1982 | 117 | −1.92% |
| 1990 | 151 | +3.24% |
| 1999 | 158 | +0.50% |
| 2007 | 220 | +4.22% |
| 2012 | 219 | −0.09% |
| 2017 | 243 | +2.10% |
| 2023 | 211 | −2.33% |
Source: INSEE

== See also ==
- Communes of the Ardennes department
