= Chalandry-Elaire =

- Commune
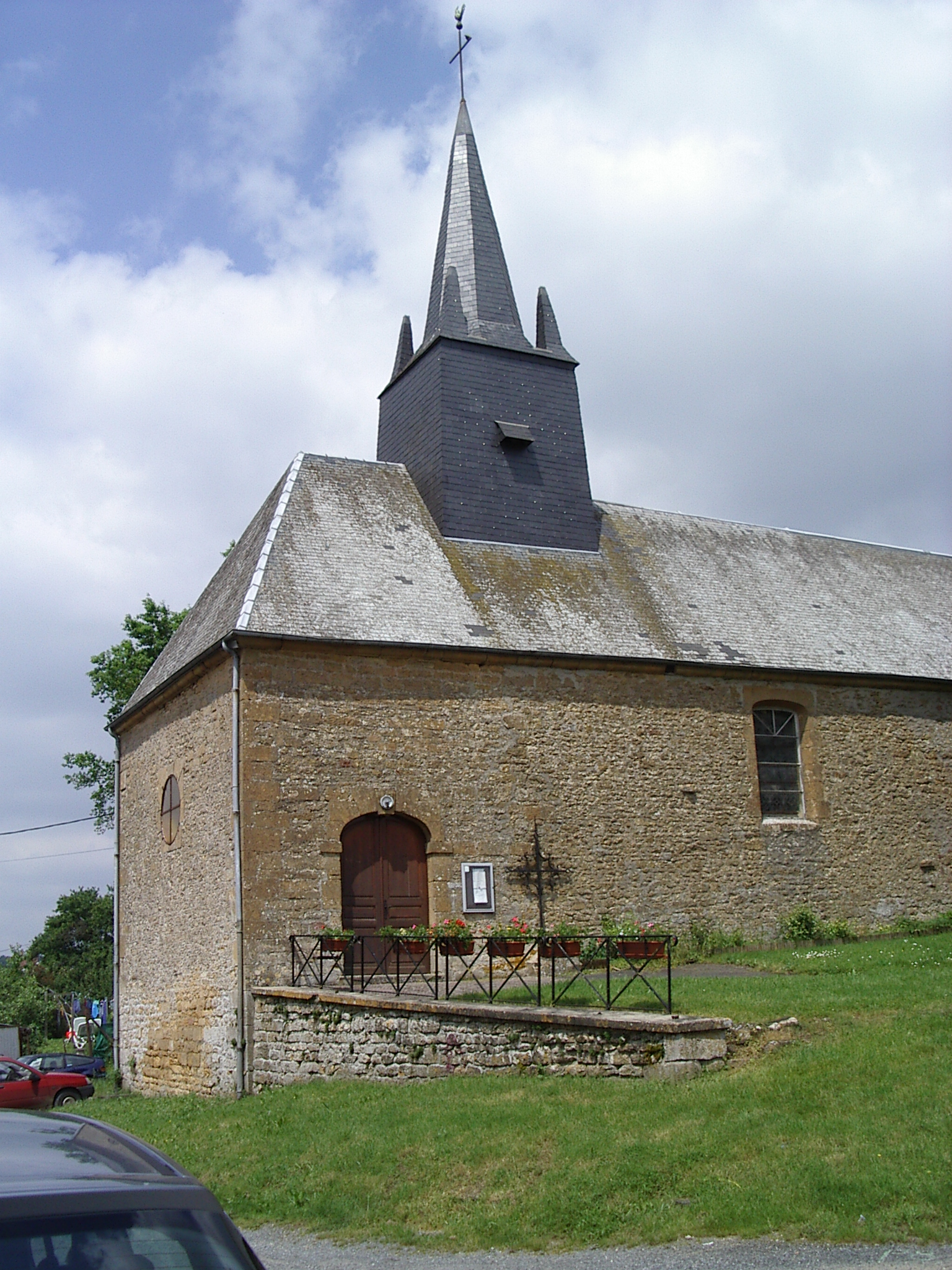
- The church in Chalandry-Elaire

- Coat of arms
- Location of Chalandry-Elaire
- Location within France Location within Grand Est
- Coordinates: 49°42′39″N 4°44′56″E
- Country: France
- Region: Grand Est
- Department: Ardennes
- Arrondissement: Charleville-Mézières
- Canton: Nouvion-sur-Meuse
- Intercommunality: CA Ardenne Métropole

Government
  - Mayor (2020–2026): Pierre Delforge
- Area^{1}: 5.18 km^{2} (2.00 sq mi)
- Elevation: 155 m (509 ft)
- Population (2023): 719
  - Density: 139/km^{2} (359/sq mi)
- Time zone: UTC+01:00 (CET)
  - Summer (DST): UTC+02:00 (CEST)
- INSEE/Postal code: 08096 /08160
- ^{1} French Land Register data, which excludes lakes, ponds, glaciers > 1 km^{2} (0.386 sq mi or 247 acres) and river estuaries.

Chalandry-Elaire (French pronunciation: [ʃalɑ̃dʁi elɛʁ]; also Chalandry-Élaire) is a commune in the Ardennes department in northern France.

== Population ==
Historical population
Year	Pop.	±% p.a.
1968	258	—
1975	291	+1.73%
1982	323	+1.50%
1990	420	+3.34%
1999	524	+2.49%
2007	577	+1.21%
2012	622	+1.51%
2017	669	+1.47%
2023	719	+1.21%
Source: INSEE

== See also ==
- Communes of the Ardennes department
