= Évigny =

- Commune
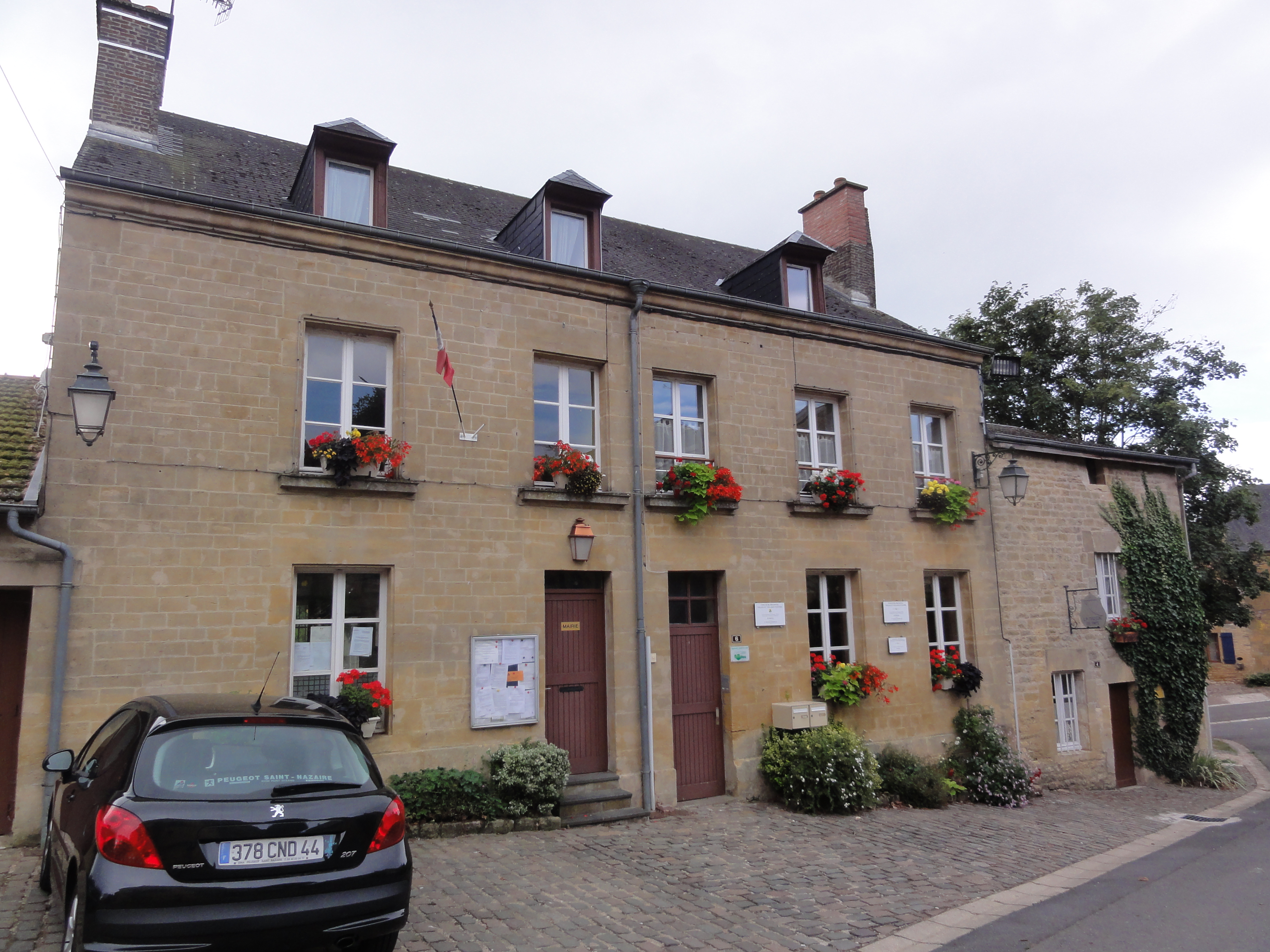
- Town hall
- Location of Évigny
- Location within France Location within Grand Est
- Coordinates: 49°43′55″N 4°40′23″E
- Country: France
- Region: Grand Est
- Department: Ardennes
- Arrondissement: Charleville-Mézières
- Canton: Nouvion-sur-Meuse
- Intercommunality: Crêtes Préardennaises

Government
  - Mayor (2020–2026): Aude Serein-Pober
- Area^{1}: 4.33 km^{2} (1.67 sq mi)
- Elevation: 200 m (660 ft)
- Population (2023): 189
  - Density: 43.6/km^{2} (113/sq mi)
- Time zone: UTC+01:00 (CET)
  - Summer (DST): UTC+02:00 (CEST)
- INSEE/Postal code: 08160 /08090
- ^{1} French Land Register data, which excludes lakes, ponds, glaciers > 1 km^{2} (0.386 sq mi or 247 acres) and river estuaries.

Évigny (French pronunciation: [eviɲi]) is a commune in the Ardennes department in the Grand Est region in northern France.

== Population ==
Historical population
Year	Pop.	±% p.a.
1968	140	—
1975	141	+0.10%
1982	208	+5.71%
1990	198	−0.61%
1999	194	−0.23%
2007	188	−0.39%
2012	203	+1.55%
2017	190	−1.31%
2023	189	−0.09%
Source: INSEE

== See also ==
- Communes of the Ardennes department
