= Chagny, Ardennes =

Chagny
- Commune
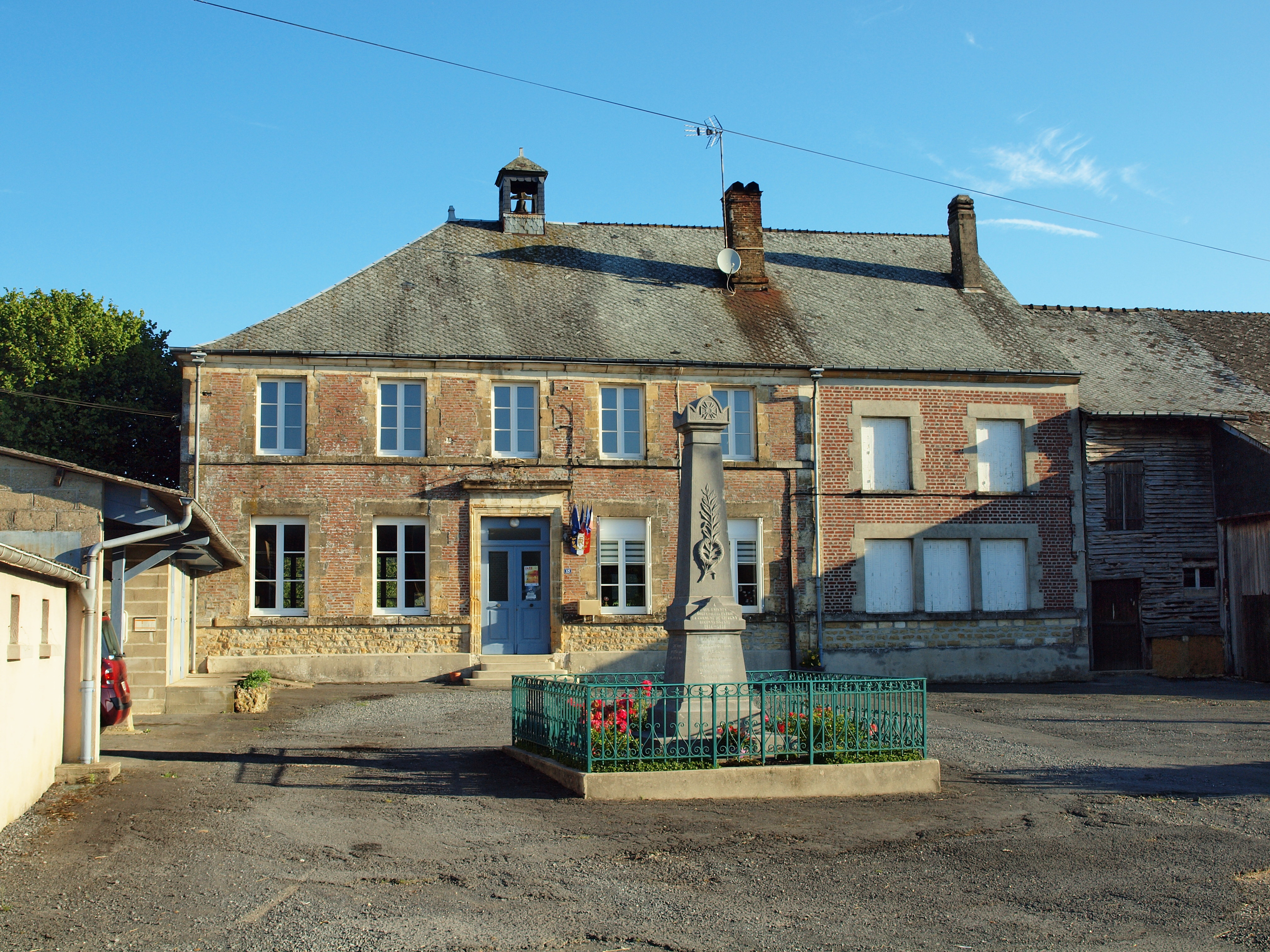
- The town hall in Chagny
- Location of Chagny
- Location within France Location within Grand Est
- Coordinates: 49°34′37″N 4°42′22″E
- Country: France
- Region: Grand Est
- Department: Ardennes
- Arrondissement: Charleville-Mézières
- Canton: Nouvion-sur-Meuse
- Intercommunality: Crêtes Préardennaises

Government
  - Mayor (2020–2026): Vincent Iaconelli
- Area^{1}: 13.35 km^{2} (5.15 sq mi)
- Elevation: 185 m (607 ft)
- Highest elevation: 267 m (876 ft)
- Lowest elevation: 177 m (581 ft)
- Population (2023): 167
  - Density: 12.5/km^{2} (32.4/sq mi)
- Time zone: UTC+01:00 (CET)
  - Summer (DST): UTC+02:00 (CEST)
- INSEE/Postal code: 08095 /08430
- ^{1} French Land Register data, which excludes lakes, ponds, glaciers > 1 km^{2} (0.386 sq mi or 247 acres) and river estuaries.

Chagny (French pronunciation: [ʃaɲi]) is a commune in the Ardennes department in northern France.

== Population ==
Historical population
Year	Pop.	±% p.a.
1968	173	—
1975	130	−4.00%
1982	127	−0.33%
1990	128	+0.10%
1999	131	+0.26%
2007	168	+3.16%
2012	182	+1.61%
2017	184	+0.22%
2023	167	−1.60%
Source: INSEE

== See also ==
- Communes of the Ardennes department
