= Guignicourt-sur-Vence =

- Commune
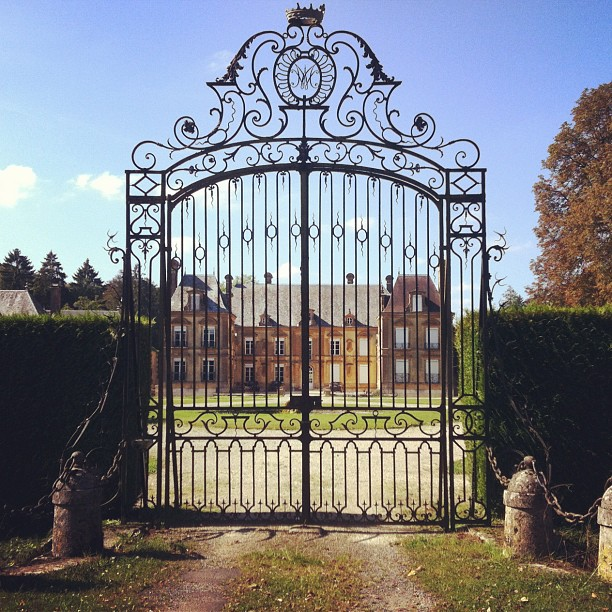
- Chateau of Guignicourt

- Coat of arms
- Location of Guignicourt-sur-Vence
- Location within France Location within Grand Est
- Coordinates: 49°40′56″N 4°39′10″E
- Country: France
- Region: Grand Est
- Department: Ardennes
- Arrondissement: Charleville-Mézières
- Canton: Nouvion-sur-Meuse
- Intercommunality: Crêtes Préardennaises

Government
  - Mayor (2020–2026): Brigitte Loizon
- Area^{1}: 9.44 km^{2} (3.64 sq mi)
- Elevation: 167 m (548 ft)
- Population (2023): 272
  - Density: 28.8/km^{2} (74.6/sq mi)
- Time zone: UTC+01:00 (CET)
  - Summer (DST): UTC+02:00 (CEST)
- INSEE/Postal code: 08203 /08430
- ^{1} French Land Register data, which excludes lakes, ponds, glaciers > 1 km^{2} (0.386 sq mi or 247 acres) and river estuaries.

Guignicourt-sur-Vence (French pronunciation: [ɡiɲikuʁ syʁ vɑ̃s]) is a commune in the Ardennes department in northern France. It lies on the river Vence.

== Population ==
Historical population
Year	Pop.	±% p.a.
1968	269	—
1975	267	−0.11%
1982	257	−0.54%
1990	313	+2.49%
1999	317	+0.14%
2007	300	−0.69%
2012	298	−0.13%
2017	302	+0.27%
2023	272	−1.73%
Source: INSEE

== Sights ==
- Arboretum de Guignicourt-sur-Vence
- Guignicourt castle, belonging to the princely family of Merode.

== See also ==
- Communes of the Ardennes department
