= Champigneul-sur-Vence =

- Commune
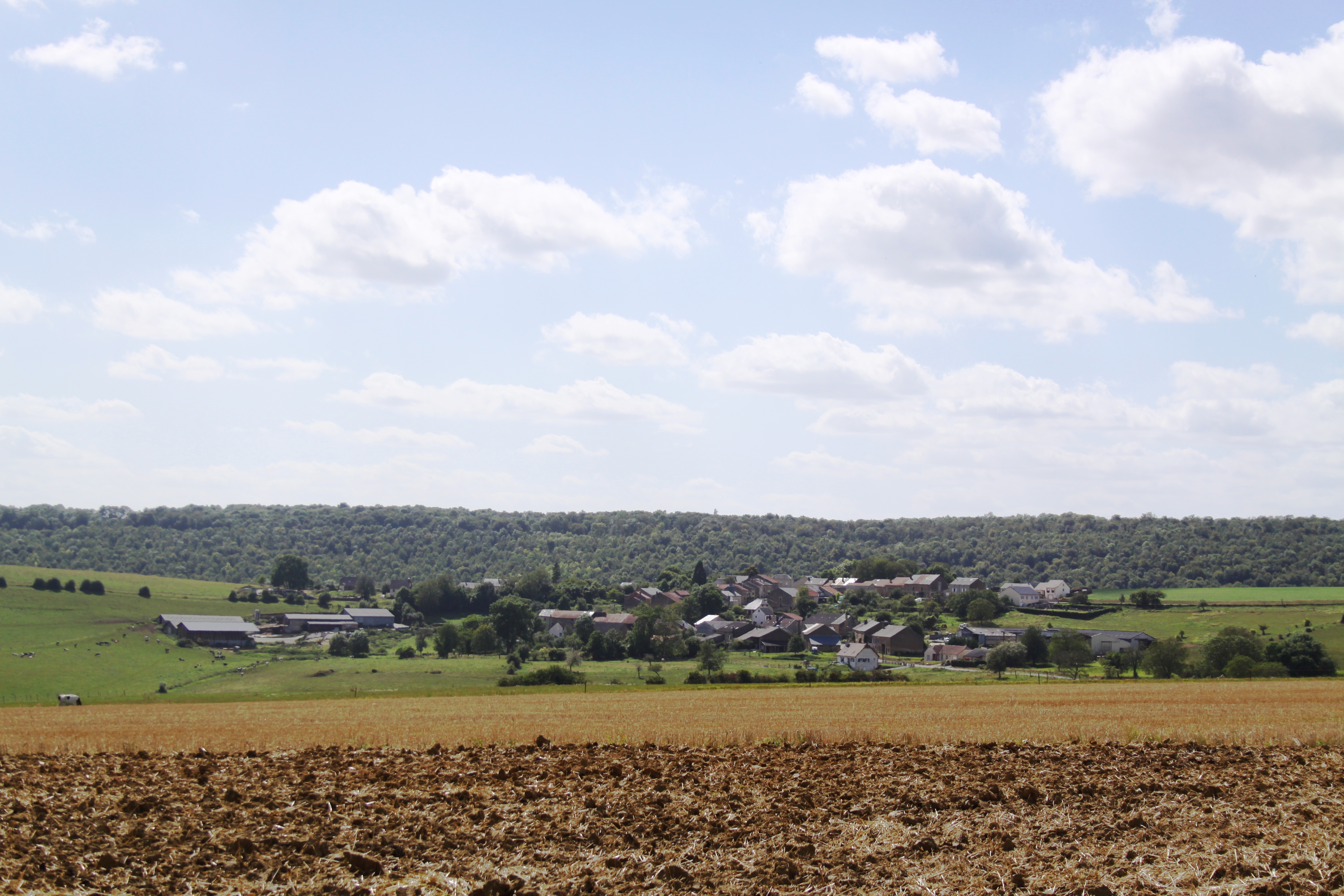
- A general view of Champigneul-sur-Vence
- Location of Champigneul-sur-Vence
- Location within France Location within Grand Est
- Coordinates: 49°42′06″N 4°39′24″E
- Country: France
- Region: Grand Est
- Department: Ardennes
- Arrondissement: Charleville-Mézières
- Canton: Nouvion-sur-Meuse
- Intercommunality: Crêtes Préardennaises

Government
  - Mayor (2020–2026): Cédric Billebaut
- Area^{1}: 4.61 km^{2} (1.78 sq mi)
- Elevation: 240 m (790 ft)
- Highest elevation: 293 m (961 ft)
- Lowest elevation: 163 m (535 ft)
- Population (2023): 125
  - Density: 27.1/km^{2} (70.2/sq mi)
- Time zone: UTC+01:00 (CET)
  - Summer (DST): UTC+02:00 (CEST)
- INSEE/Postal code: 08099 /08430
- ^{1} French Land Register data, which excludes lakes, ponds, glaciers > 1 km^{2} (0.386 sq mi or 247 acres) and river estuaries.

Champigneul-sur-Vence (French pronunciation: [ʃɑ̃piɲœl syʁ vɑ̃s]) is a commune in the Ardennes department and Grand Est region of north-eastern France.

== Population ==
Historical population
Year	Pop.	±% p.a.
1968	81	—
1975	69	−2.26%
1982	61	−1.75%
1990	87	+4.54%
1999	105	+2.11%
2007	129	+2.61%
2012	130	+0.15%
2017	122	−1.26%
2023	125	+0.41%
Source: INSEE

== See also ==
- Communes of the Ardennes department
