= Saint-Pierre-sur-Vence =

- Commune
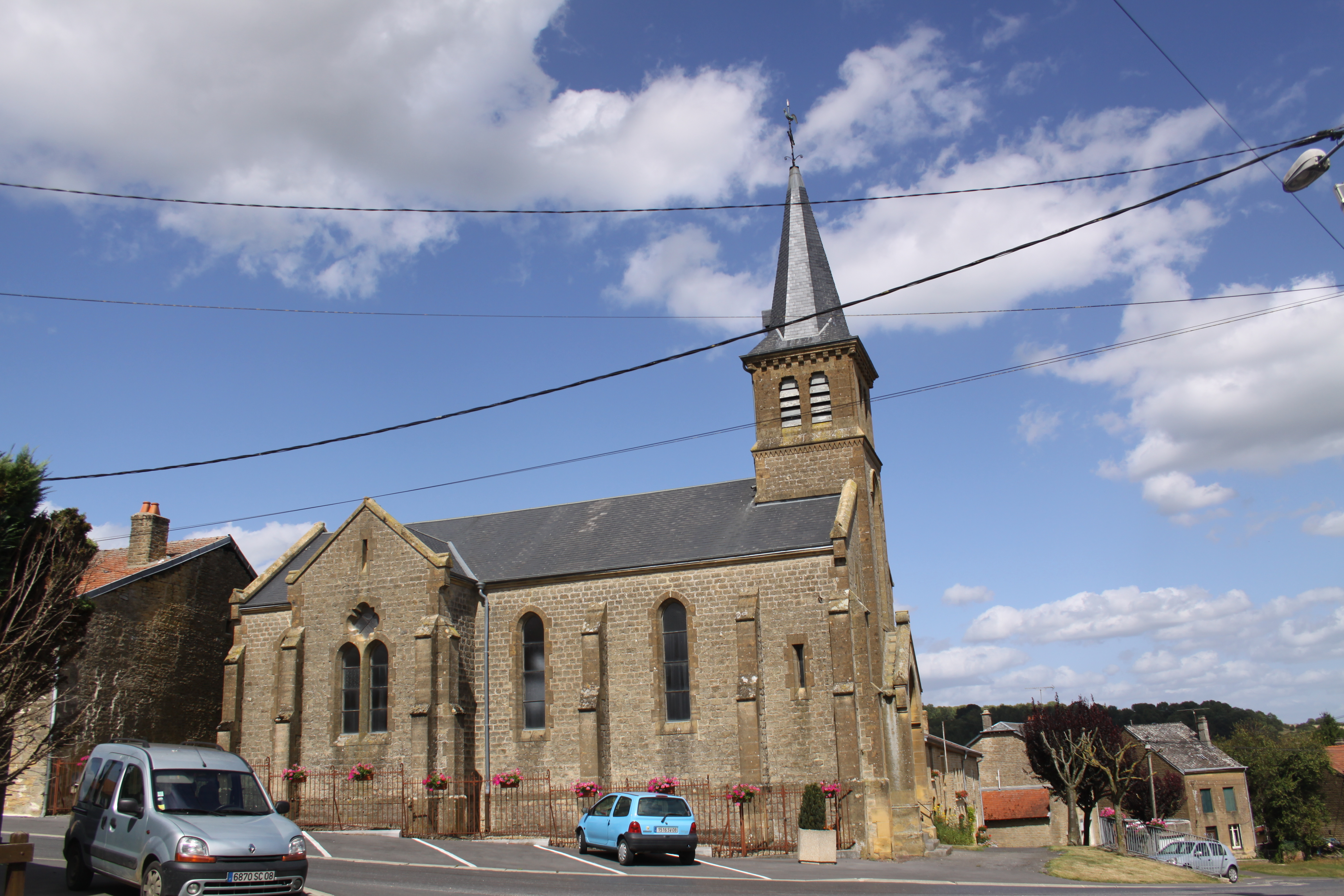
- The church in Saint-Pierre-sur-Vence
- Location of Saint-Pierre-sur-Vence
- Location within France Location within Grand Est
- Coordinates: 49°41′39″N 4°40′28″E
- Country: France
- Region: Grand Est
- Department: Ardennes
- Arrondissement: Charleville-Mézières
- Canton: Nouvion-sur-Meuse
- Intercommunality: Crêtes Préardennaises

Government
  - Mayor (2020–2026): Franciane Baelden
- Area^{1}: 4.63 km^{2} (1.79 sq mi)
- Elevation: 150 m (490 ft)
- Population (2023): 152
  - Density: 32.8/km^{2} (85.0/sq mi)
- Time zone: UTC+01:00 (CET)
  - Summer (DST): UTC+02:00 (CEST)
- INSEE/Postal code: 08395 /08430
- ^{1} French Land Register data, which excludes lakes, ponds, glaciers > 1 km^{2} (0.386 sq mi or 247 acres) and river estuaries.

Saint-Pierre-sur-Vence (French pronunciation: [sɛ̃ pjɛʁ syʁ vɑ̃s]) is a commune in the Ardennes department in northern France. It lies on the river Vence.

== Population ==
Historical population
Year	Pop.	±% p.a.
1968	147	—
1975	134	−1.31%
1982	145	+1.13%
1990	181	+2.81%
1999	158	−1.50%
2007	163	+0.39%
2012	148	−1.91%
2017	121	−3.95%
2023	152	+3.87%
Source: INSEE

== See also ==
- Communes of the Ardennes department
