= Omicourt =

- Commune
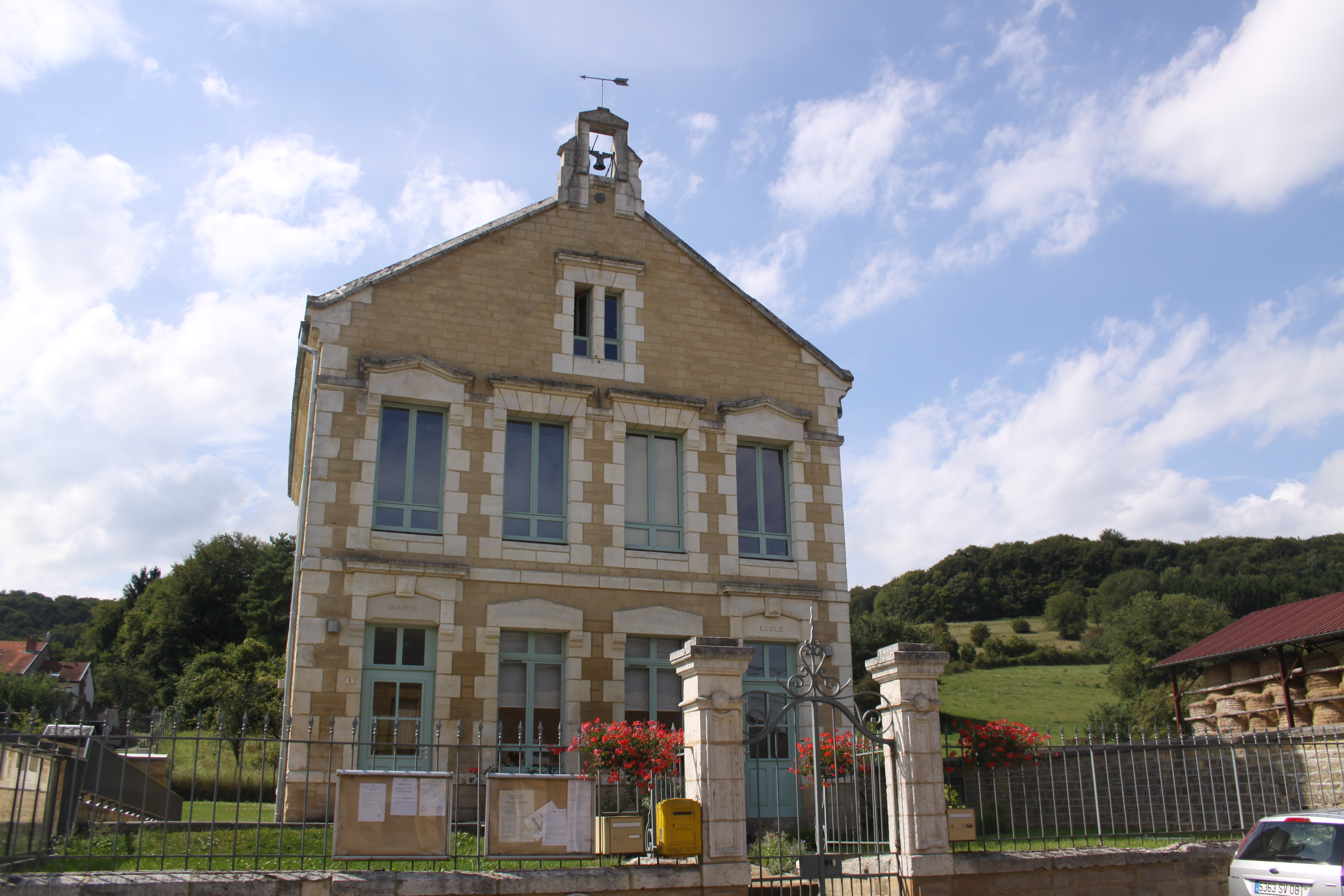
- Town hall
- Location of Omicourt
- Location within France Location within Grand Est
- Coordinates: 49°37′56″N 4°49′57″E
- Country: France
- Region: Grand Est
- Department: Ardennes
- Arrondissement: Charleville-Mézières
- Canton: Nouvion-sur-Meuse
- Intercommunality: Crêtes Préardennaises

Government
  - Mayor (2020–2026): Jean-Marc Deglaire
- Area^{1}: 7.36 km^{2} (2.84 sq mi)
- Elevation: 160 m (520 ft)
- Population (2023): 42
  - Density: 5.7/km^{2} (15/sq mi)
- Time zone: UTC+01:00 (CET)
  - Summer (DST): UTC+02:00 (CEST)
- INSEE/Postal code: 08334 /08450
- ^{1} French Land Register data, which excludes lakes, ponds, glaciers > 1 km^{2} (0.386 sq mi or 247 acres) and river estuaries.

Omicourt (French pronunciation: [ɔmikuʁ]) is a commune in the Ardennes department in northern France.

== Population ==
Historical population
Year	Pop.	±% p.a.
1968	47	—
1975	26	−8.11%
1982	26	+0.00%
1990	27	+0.47%
1999	34	+2.59%
2007	49	+4.67%
2012	39	−4.46%
2017	40	+0.51%
2023	42	+0.82%
Source: INSEE

== See also ==
- Communes of the Ardennes department
