= Sapogne-et-Feuchères =

- Commune
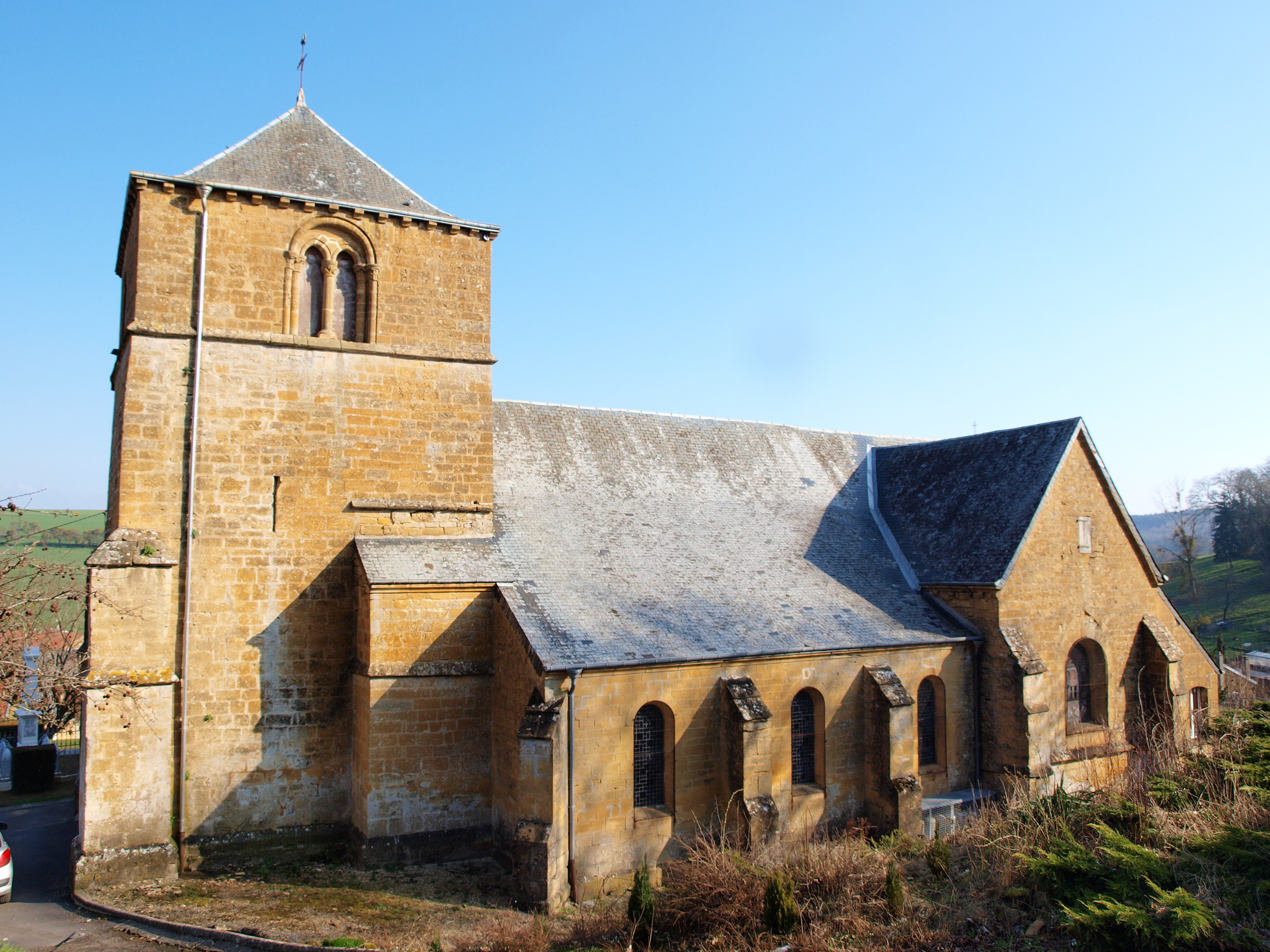
- The church in Sapogne-et-Feuchères

- Coat of arms
- Location of Sapogne-et-Feuchères
- Location within France Location within Grand Est
- Coordinates: 49°39′39″N 4°47′47″E
- Country: France
- Region: Grand Est
- Department: Ardennes
- Arrondissement: Charleville-Mézières
- Canton: Nouvion-sur-Meuse
- Intercommunality: CA Ardenne Métropole

Government
  - Mayor (2020–2026): Frédéric Gillet
- Area^{1}: 10.71 km^{2} (4.14 sq mi)
- Elevation: 240 m (790 ft)
- Highest elevation: 300 m (980 ft)
- Lowest elevation: 149 m (489 ft)
- Population (2023): 514
  - Density: 48.0/km^{2} (124/sq mi)
- Time zone: UTC+01:00 (CET)
  - Summer (DST): UTC+02:00 (CEST)
- INSEE/Postal code: 08400 /08160
- ^{1} French Land Register data, which excludes lakes, ponds, glaciers > 1 km^{2} (0.386 sq mi or 247 acres) and river estuaries.

Sapogne-et-Feuchères (French pronunciation: [sapɔɲ e føʃɛʁ]) is a commune in the Ardennes department in northern France.

== Population ==
Historical population
| Year | Pop. | ±% p.a. |
|---|---|---|
| 1968 | 402 | — |
| 1975 | 435 | +1.13% |
| 1982 | 450 | +0.49% |
| 1990 | 473 | +0.63% |
| 1999 | 504 | +0.71% |
| 2007 | 505 | +0.02% |
| 2012 | 523 | +0.70% |
| 2017 | 516 | −0.27% |
| 2023 | 514 | −0.06% |
Source: INSEE

== See also ==
- Communes of the Ardennes department
