= Canton of Nouvion-sur-Meuse =

Coordinates: 49.70°N 4.79°E

- Canton
- Situation of the canton of Nouvion-sur-Meuse in the department of Ardennes
- Country: France
- Region: Grand Est
- Department: Ardennes
- No. of communes: {{{nbcomm}}}
- Population (2023): 13,875
- INSEE code: 0810

The canton of Nouvion-sur-Meuse is an administrative division of the Ardennes department, northern France. It was created at the French canton reorganisation which came into effect in March 2015. Its seat is in Nouvion-sur-Meuse.

It consists of the following communes:

1. Les Ayvelles
2. Baâlons
3. Boulzicourt
4. Bouvellemont
5. Chagny
6. Chalandry-Elaire
7. Champigneul-sur-Vence
8. Dom-le-Mesnil
9. Étrépigny
10. Évigny
11. Flize
12. Guignicourt-sur-Vence
13. Hannogne-Saint-Martin
14. La Horgne
15. Mazerny
16. Mondigny
17. Montigny-sur-Vence
18. Nouvion-sur-Meuse
19. Omicourt
20. Omont
21. Poix-Terron
22. Saint-Marceau
23. Saint-Pierre-sur-Vence
24. Sapogne-et-Feuchères
25. Singly
26. Touligny
27. Vendresse
28. Villers-le-Tilleul
29. Villers-sur-le-Mont
30. Vrigne-Meuse
31. Warnécourt
32. Yvernaumont
