= Bouvellemont =

- Commune
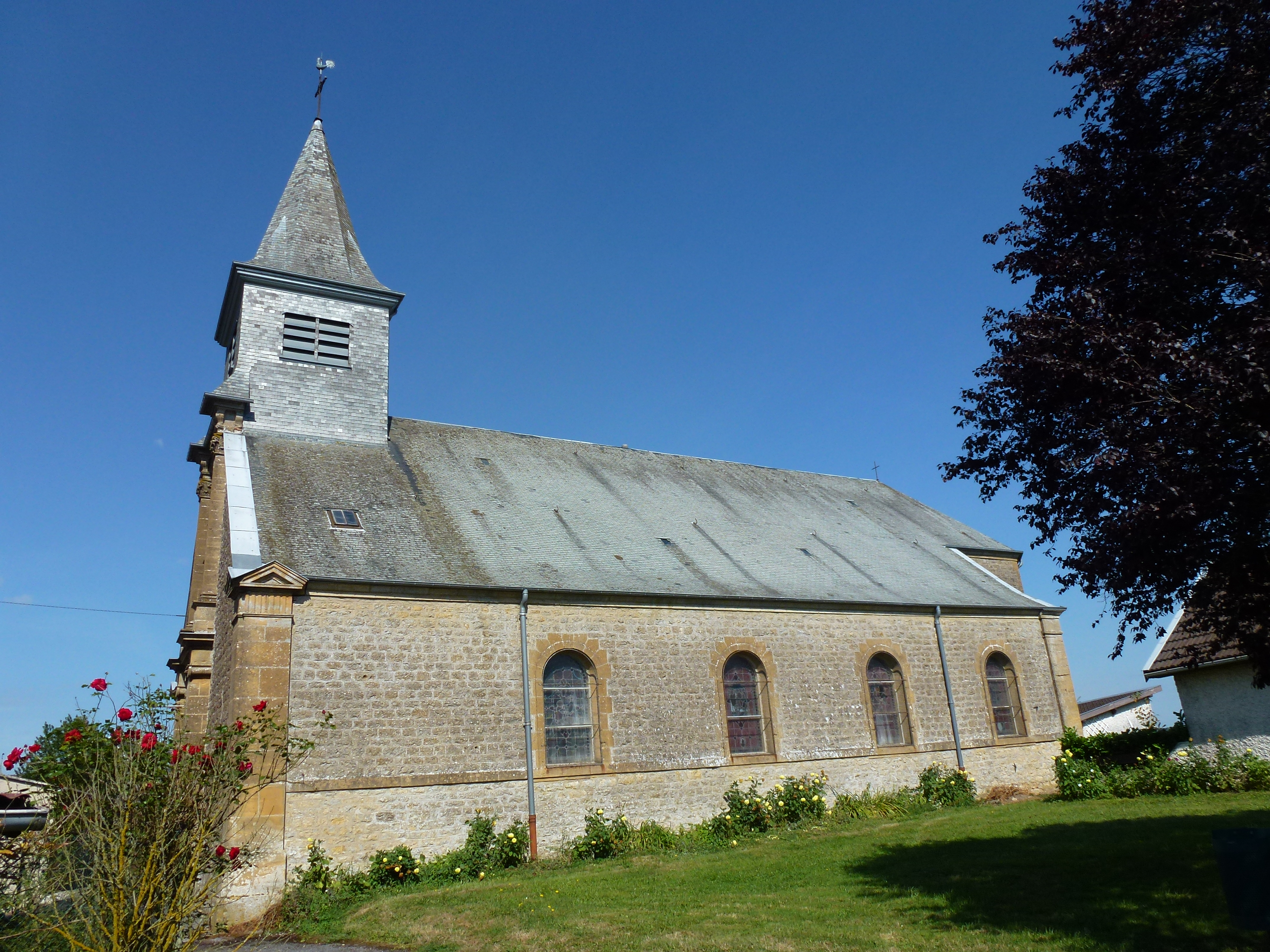
- The church in Bouvellemont

- Coat of arms
- Location of Bouvellemont
- Location within France Location within Grand Est
- Coordinates: 49°35′04″N 4°39′45″E
- Country: France
- Region: Grand Est
- Department: Ardennes
- Arrondissement: Charleville-Mézières
- Canton: Nouvion-sur-Meuse
- Intercommunality: Crêtes Préardennaises

Government
  - Mayor (2020–2026): Vincent Bertrand
- Area^{1}: 4.31 km^{2} (1.66 sq mi)
- Elevation: 252 m (827 ft)
- Highest elevation: 258 m (846 ft)
- Lowest elevation: 189 m (620 ft)
- Population (2023): 117
  - Density: 27.1/km^{2} (70.3/sq mi)
- Time zone: UTC+01:00 (CET)
  - Summer (DST): UTC+02:00 (CEST)
- INSEE/Postal code: 08080 /08430
- ^{1} French Land Register data, which excludes lakes, ponds, glaciers > 1 km^{2} (0.386 sq mi or 247 acres) and river estuaries.

Bouvellemont (French pronunciation: [buvɛlmɔ̃]) is a commune in the Ardennes department in northern France.

== Population ==
Historical population
Year	Pop.	±% p.a.
1968	88	—
1975	94	+0.95%
1982	83	−1.76%
1990	97	+1.97%
1999	79	−2.25%
2007	96	+2.47%
2012	94	−0.42%
2017	121	+5.18%
2023	117	−0.56%
Source: INSEE

== See also ==
- Communes of the Ardennes department
