= Saint-Marceau, Ardennes =

Saint-Marceau
- Commune
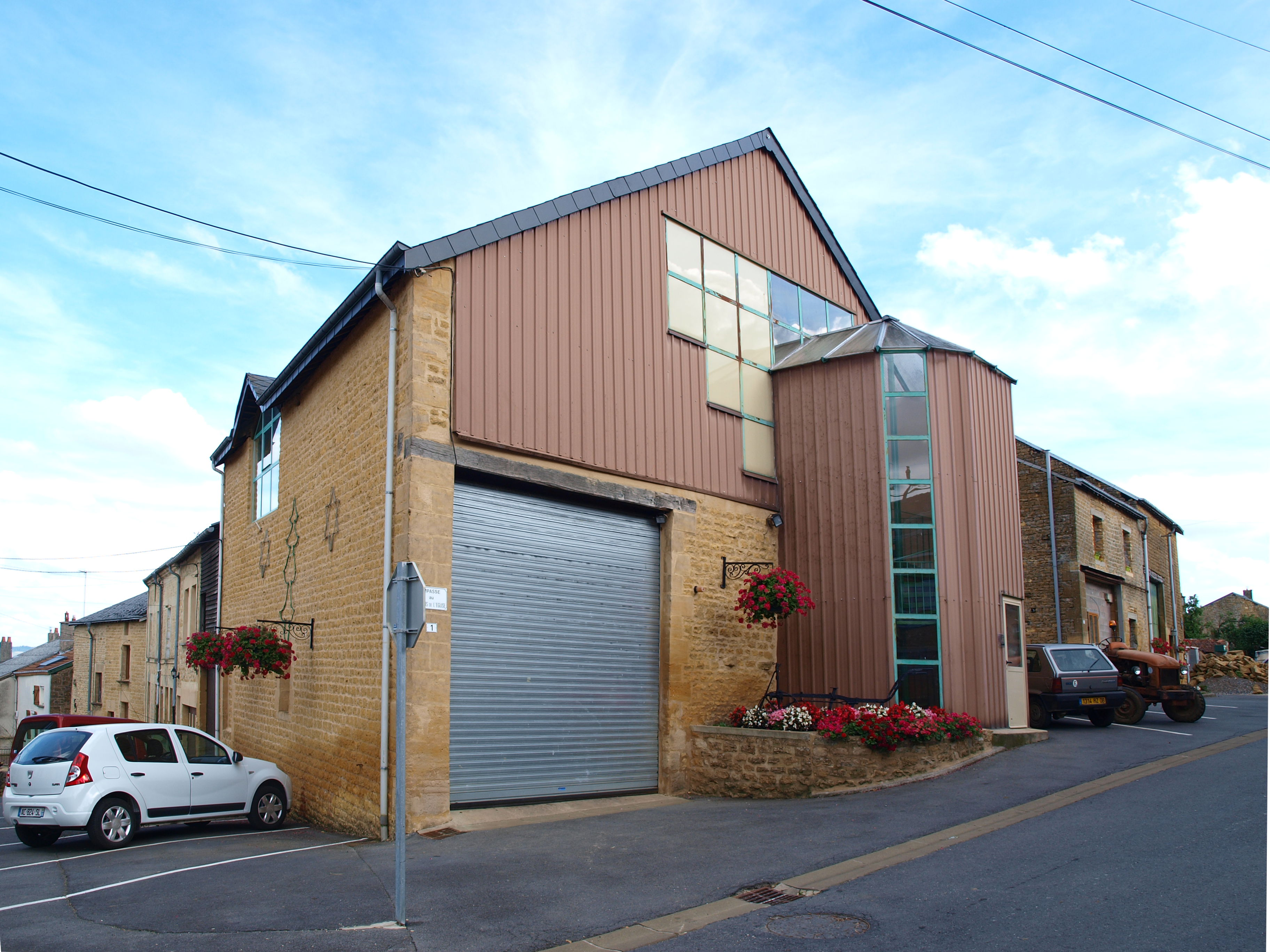
- The town hall in Saint-Marceau

- Coat of arms
- Location of Saint-Marceau
- Location within France Location within Grand Est
- Coordinates: 49°42′N 4°43′E
- Country: France
- Region: Grand Est
- Department: Ardennes
- Arrondissement: Charleville-Mézières
- Canton: Nouvion-sur-Meuse

Government
  - Mayor (2020–2026): Teddy Etienne
- Area^{1}: 4.80 km^{2} (1.85 sq mi)
- Elevation: 155 m (509 ft)
- Highest elevation: 231 m (758 ft)
- Lowest elevation: 153 m (502 ft)
- Population (2023): 357
  - Density: 74.4/km^{2} (193/sq mi)
- Time zone: UTC+01:00 (CET)
  - Summer (DST): UTC+02:00 (CEST)
- INSEE/Postal code: 08388 /08160
- ^{1} French Land Register data, which excludes lakes, ponds, glaciers > 1 km^{2} (0.386 sq mi or 247 acres) and river estuaries.

Saint-Marceau (French pronunciation: [sɛ̃ maʁso]) is a commune in the Ardennes department in northern France.

== Population ==
Historical population
Year	Pop.	±% p.a.
1968	201	—
1975	267	+4.14%
1982	364	+4.53%
1990	411	+1.53%
1999	421	+0.27%
2007	380	−1.27%
2012	362	−0.97%
2017	346	−0.90%
2023	357	+0.52%
Source: INSEE

== See also ==
- Communes of the Ardennes department
