= Villers-sur-le-Mont =

- Commune
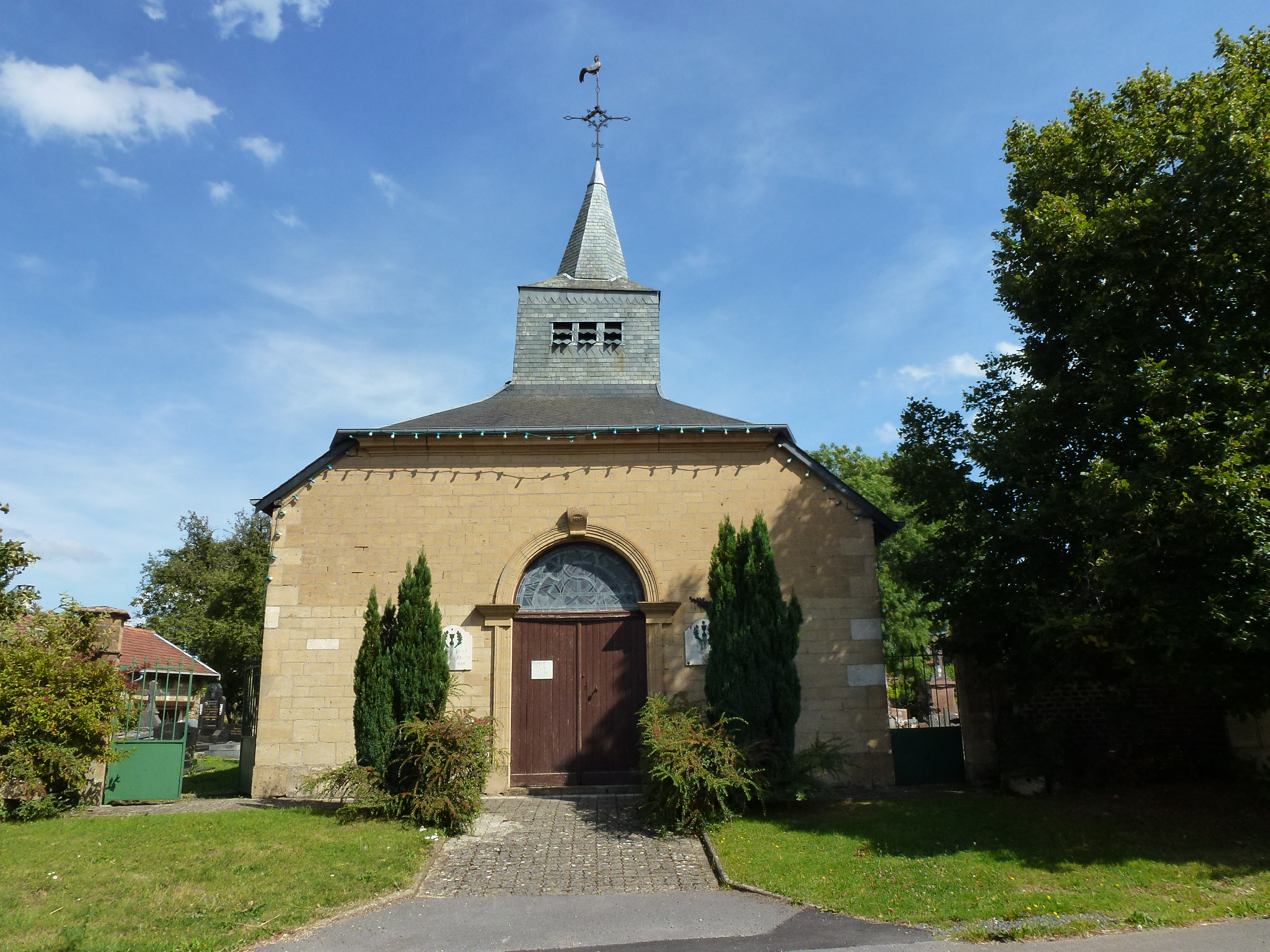
- The church in Villers-sur-le-Mont
- Location of Villers-sur-le-Mont
- Location within France Location within Grand Est
- Coordinates: 49°39′54″N 4°40′50″E
- Country: France
- Region: Grand Est
- Department: Ardennes
- Arrondissement: Charleville-Mézières
- Canton: Nouvion-sur-Meuse
- Intercommunality: Crêtes Préardennaises

Government
  - Mayor (2020–2026): Vincent Colinet
- Area^{1}: 5.3 km^{2} (2.0 sq mi)
- Elevation: 283 m (928 ft)
- Highest elevation: 312 m (1,024 ft)
- Lowest elevation: 195 m (640 ft)
- Population (2023): 101
  - Density: 19/km^{2} (49/sq mi)
- Time zone: UTC+01:00 (CET)
  - Summer (DST): UTC+02:00 (CEST)
- INSEE/Postal code: 08482 /08430
- ^{1} French Land Register data, which excludes lakes, ponds, glaciers > 1 km^{2} (0.386 sq mi or 247 acres) and river estuaries.

Villers-sur-le-Mont (French pronunciation: [vilɛʁ syʁ lə mɔ̃]) is a commune in the Ardennes department in northern France.

== Population ==
Historical population
Year	Pop.	±% p.a.
1968	33	—
1975	31	−0.89%
1982	47	+6.13%
1990	62	+3.52%
1999	77	+2.44%
2007	101	+3.45%
2012	94	−1.43%
2017	110	+3.19%
2023	101	−1.41%
Source: INSEE

== See also ==
- Communes of the Ardennes department
