= Yvernaumont =

- Commune
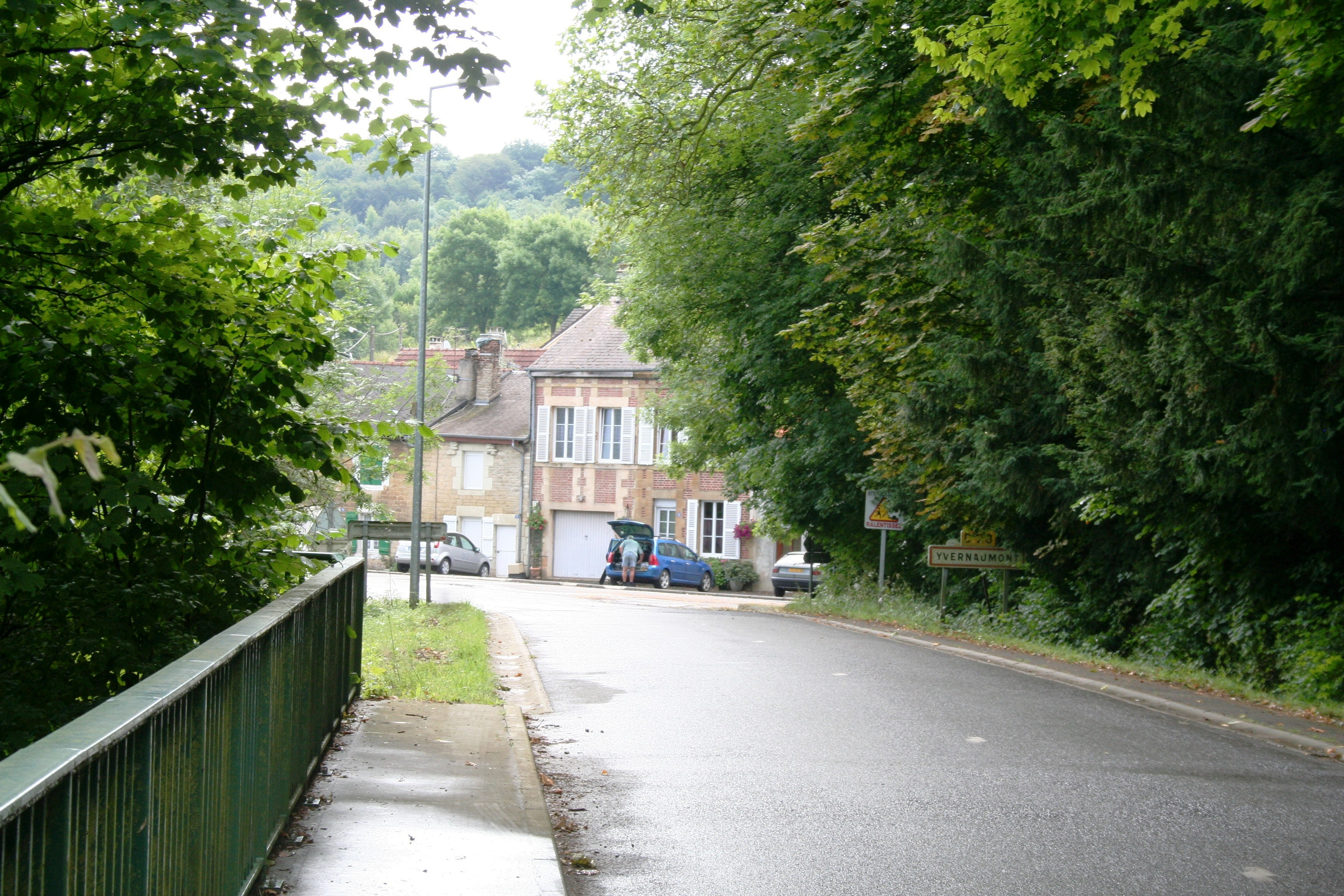
- The road into Yvernaumont
- Location of Yvernaumont
- Location within France Location within Grand Est
- Coordinates: 49°40′45″N 4°39′33″E
- Country: France
- Region: Grand Est
- Department: Ardennes
- Arrondissement: Charleville-Mézières
- Canton: Nouvion-sur-Meuse
- Intercommunality: Crêtes Préardennaises

Government
  - Mayor (2020–2026): Josette Peltier
- Area^{1}: 2.82 km^{2} (1.09 sq mi)
- Elevation: 167 m (548 ft)
- Highest elevation: 302 m (991 ft)
- Lowest elevation: 162 m (531 ft)
- Population (2023): 118
  - Density: 41.8/km^{2} (108/sq mi)
- Time zone: UTC+01:00 (CET)
  - Summer (DST): UTC+02:00 (CEST)
- INSEE/Postal code: 08503 /08430
- ^{1} French Land Register data, which excludes lakes, ponds, glaciers > 1 km^{2} (0.386 sq mi or 247 acres) and river estuaries.

Yvernaumont (French pronunciation: [ivɛʁnomɔ̃]) is a commune in the Ardennes department in northern France. It lies on the river Vence.

== Population ==
Historical population
Year	Pop.	±% p.a.
1968	110	—
1975	110	+0.00%
1982	118	+1.01%
1990	117	−0.11%
1999	140	+2.01%
2007	143	+0.27%
2012	141	−0.28%
2017	139	−0.29%
2023	118	−2.69%
Source: INSEE

== See also ==
- Communes of the Ardennes department
