= Arrondissement of Charleville-Mézières =

Coordinates: 49.77°N 4.72°E

Charleville-Mézières
- Arrondissement
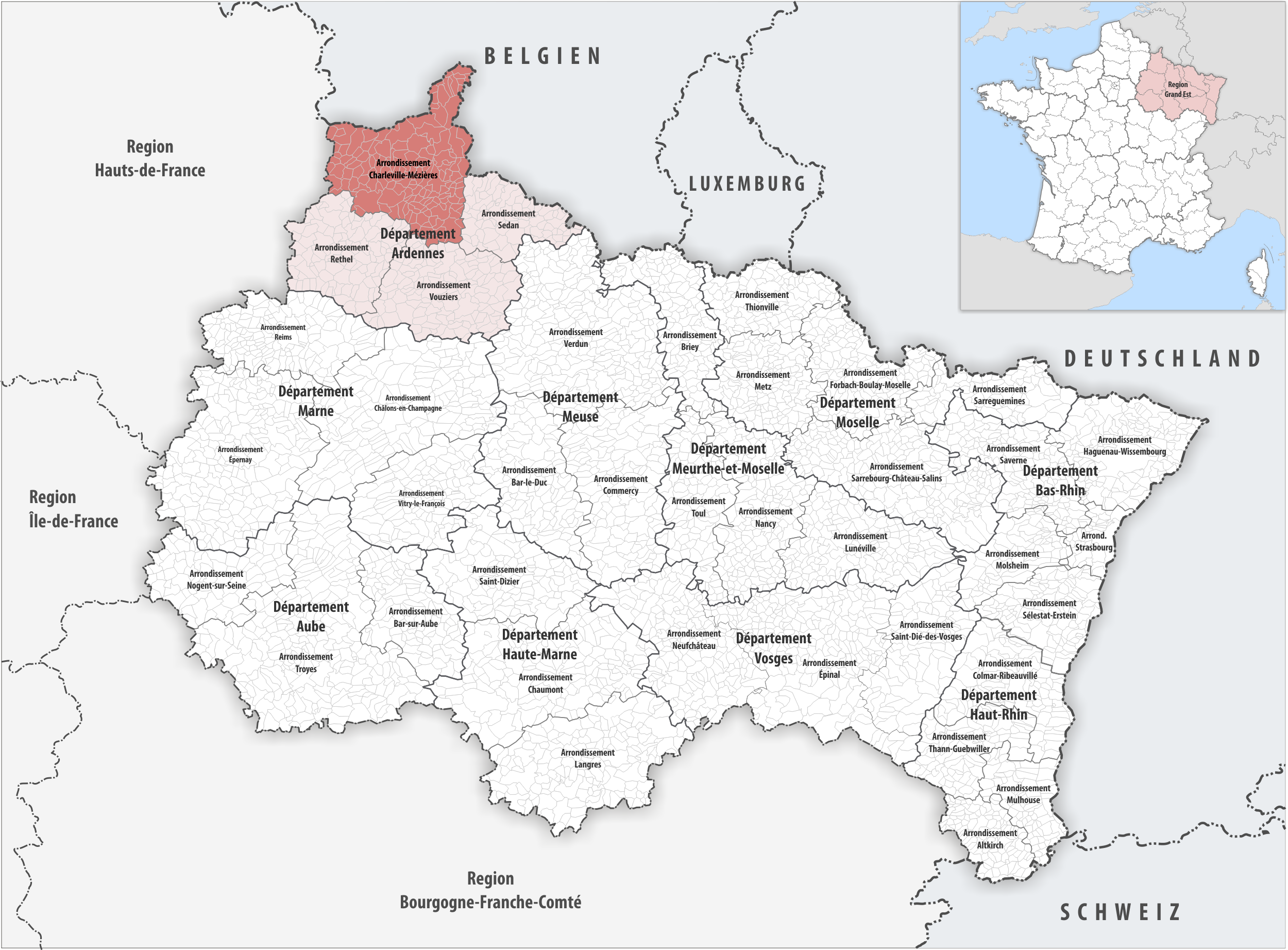
- Location within the region Grand Est
- Country: France
- Region: Grand Est
- Department: Ardennes
- No. of communes: {{{nbcomm}}}
- Area: 1,825.3 km^{2} (704.8 sq mi)
- Population (2023): 151,970
  - Density: 83.258/km^{2} (215.64/sq mi)
- INSEE code: 081

The arrondissement of Charleville-Mézières is an arrondissement of France in the Ardennes department in the Grand Est region. It has 157 communes. Its population is 153,985 (2021), and its area is 1,825.3 km^{2} (704.8 sq mi).

== Composition ==
The communes of the arrondissement of Charleville-Mézières, and their INSEE codes, are:

1. Aiglemont (08003)
2. Anchamps (08011)
3. Antheny (08015)
4. Aouste (08016)
5. Arreux (08022)
6. Aubigny-les-Pothées (08026)
7. Aubrives (08028)
8. Auge (08030)
9. Auvillers-les-Forges (08037)
10. Les Ayvelles (08040)
11. Baâlons (08041)
12. Barbaise (08047)
13. Belval (08058)
14. Blanchefosse-et-Bay (08069)
15. Blombay (08071)
16. Bogny-sur-Meuse (08081)
17. Bossus-lès-Rumigny (08073)
18. Boulzicourt (08076)
19. Bourg-Fidèle (08078)
20. Bouvellemont (08080)
21. Brognon (08087)
22. Cernion (08094)
23. Chagny (08095)
24. Chalandry-Elaire (08096)
25. Champigneul-sur-Vence (08099)
26. Champlin (08100)
27. Charleville-Mézières (08105)
28. Charnois (08106)
29. Le Châtelet-sur-Sormonne (08110)
30. Chilly (08121)
31. Chooze (08122)
32. Clavy-Warby (08124)
33. Cliron (08125)
34. Damouzy (08137)
35. Deville (08139)
36. Dom-le-Mesnil (08140)
37. Dommery (08141)
38. L'Échelle (08149)
39. Estrebay (08154)
40. Étalle (08155)
41. Éteignières (08156)
42. Étrépigny (08158)
43. Évigny (08160)
44. Fagnon (08162)
45. Fépin (08166)
46. La Férée (08167)
47. Flaignes-Havys (08169)
48. Fligny (08172)
49. Flize (08173)
50. Foisches (08175)
51. La Francheville (08180)
52. Le Fréty (08182)
53. Fromelennes (08183)
54. Fumay (08185)
55. Gernelle (08187)
56. Gespunsart (08188)
57. Girondelle (08189)
58. Givet (08190)
59. La Grandville (08199)
60. Gruyères (08201)
61. Gué-d'Hossus (08202)
62. Guignicourt-sur-Vence (08203)
63. Ham-les-Moines (08206)
64. Ham-sur-Meuse (08207)
65. Hannappes (08208)
66. Hannogne-Saint-Martin (08209)
67. Harcy (08212)
68. Hargnies (08214)
69. Haudrecy (08216)
70. Haulmé (08217)
71. Les Hautes-Rivières (08218)
72. Haybes (08222)
73. Hierges (08226)
74. La Horgne (08228)
75. Houldizy (08230)
76. Issancourt-et-Rumel (08235)
77. Jandun (08236)
78. Joigny-sur-Meuse (08237)
79. Laifour (08242)
80. Lalobbe (08243)
81. Landrichamps (08247)
82. Launois-sur-Vence (08248)
83. Laval-Morency (08249)
84. Lépron-les-Vallées (08251)
85. Liart (08254)
86. Logny-Bogny (08257)
87. Lonny (08260)
88. Lumes (08263)
89. Maranwez (08272)
90. Marby (08273)
91. Marlemont (08277)
92. Maubert-Fontaine (08282)
93. Mazerny (08283)
94. Les Mazures (08284)
95. Mondigny (08295)
96. Montcornet (08297)
97. Montcy-Notre-Dame (08298)
98. Monthermé (08302)
99. Montigny-sur-Meuse (08304)
100. Montigny-sur-Vence (08305)
101. Murtin-et-Bogny (08312)
102. Neufmaison (08315)
103. Neufmanil (08316)
104. La Neuville-aux-Joûtes (08318)
105. Neuville-lès-This (08322)
106. Neuville-lez-Beaulieu (08319)
107. Nouvion-sur-Meuse (08327)
108. Nouzonville (08328)
109. Omicourt (08334)
110. Omont (08335)
111. Poix-Terron (08341)
112. Prez (08344)
113. Prix-lès-Mézières (08346)
114. Raillicourt (08352)
115. Rancennes (08353)
116. Regniowez (08355)
117. Remilly-les-Pothées (08358)
118. Renwez (08361)
119. Revin (08363)
120. Rimogne (08365)
121. Rocroi (08367)
122. Rouvroy-sur-Audry (08370)
123. Rumigny (08373)
124. Saint-Laurent (08385)
125. Saint-Marceau (08388)
126. Saint-Marcel (08389)
127. Saint-Pierre-sur-Vence (08395)
128. Sapogne-et-Feuchères (08400)
129. Sécheval (08408)
130. Sévigny-la-Forêt (08417)
131. Signy-l'Abbaye (08419)
132. Signy-le-Petit (08420)
133. Singly (08422)
134. Sormonne (08429)
135. Sury (08432)
136. Taillette (08436)
137. Tarzy (08440)
138. Thilay (08448)
139. Thin-le-Moutier (08449)
140. This (08450)
141. Touligny (08454)
142. Tournavaux (08456)
143. Tournes (08457)
144. Tremblois-lès-Rocroi (08460)
145. Vaux-Villaine (08468)
146. Vendresse (08469)
147. Villers-le-Tilleul (08478)
148. Villers-Semeuse (08480)
149. Villers-sur-le-Mont (08482)
150. Ville-sur-Lumes (08483)
151. Vireux-Molhain (08486)
152. Vireux-Wallerand (08487)
153. Vivier-au-Court (08488)
154. Vrigne-Meuse (08492)
155. Warcq (08497)
156. Warnécourt (08498)
157. Yvernaumont (08503)

== History ==
The arrondissement of Charleville-Mézières (before 1966: Mézières) was created in 1800.

As a result of the reorganisation of the cantons of France which came into effect in 2015, the borders of the cantons are no longer related to the borders of the arrondissements. The cantons of the arrondissement of Charleville-Mézières were, as of January 2015:

1. Charleville-Centre
2. Charleville-La Houillère
3. Flize
4. Fumay
5. Givet
6. Mézières-Centre-Ouest
7. Mézières-Est
8. Monthermé
9. Nouzonville
10. Omont
11. Renwez
12. Revin
13. Rocroi
14. Rumigny
15. Signy-l'Abbaye
16. Signy-le-Petit
17. Villers-Semeuse
