= Villers-le-Tilleul =

- Commune
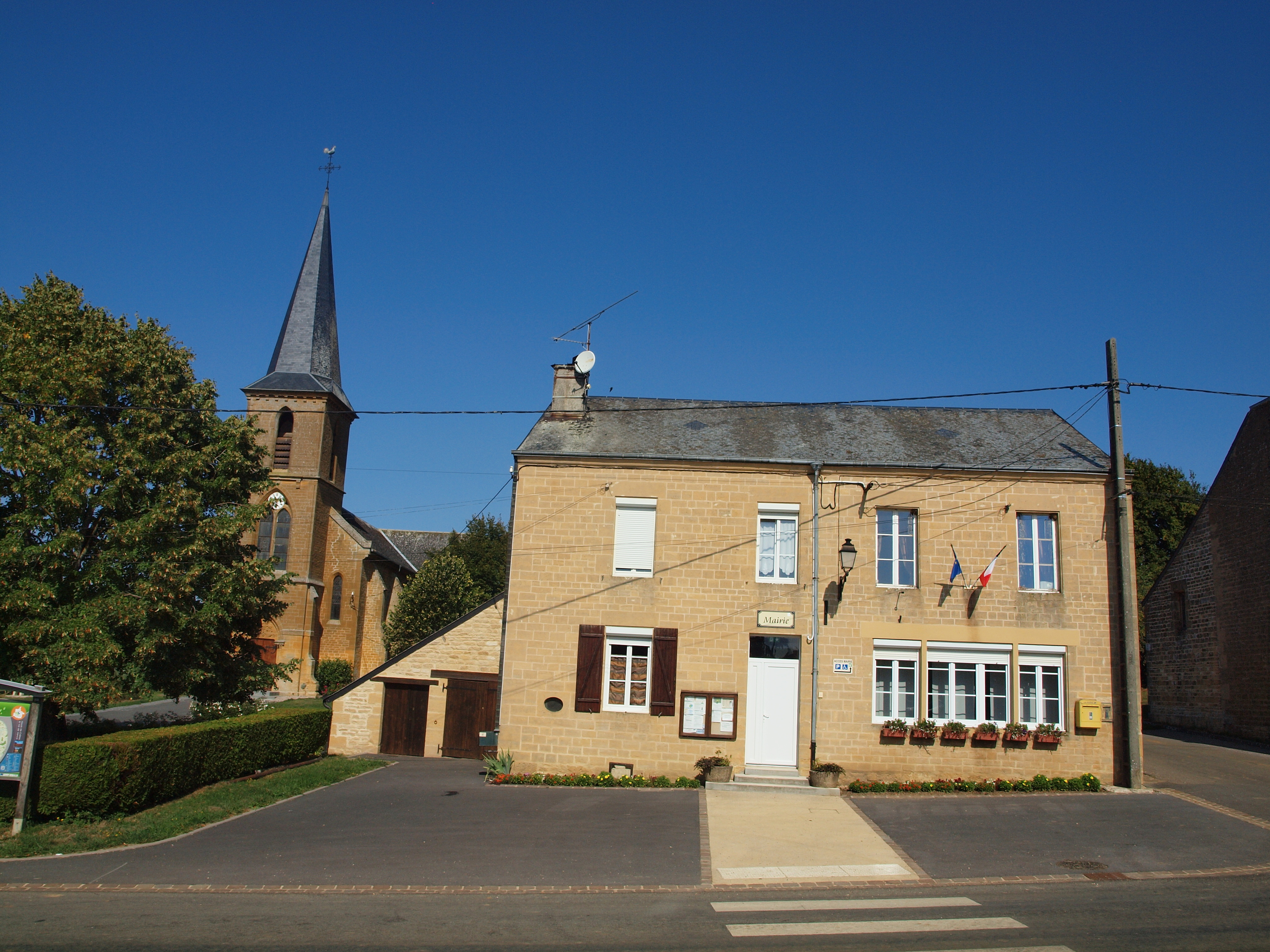
- The town hall in Villers-le-Tilleul

- Coat of arms
- Location of Villers-le-Tilleul
- Location within France Location within Grand Est
- Coordinates: 49°38′10″N 4°43′40″E
- Country: France
- Region: Grand Est
- Department: Ardennes
- Arrondissement: Charleville-Mézières
- Canton: Nouvion-sur-Meuse
- Intercommunality: Crêtes Préardennaises

Government
  - Mayor (2020–2026): Jean Barrois
- Area^{1}: 8.61 km^{2} (3.32 sq mi)
- Elevation: 304 m (997 ft)
- Population (2023): 240
  - Density: 28/km^{2} (72/sq mi)
- Time zone: UTC+01:00 (CET)
  - Summer (DST): UTC+02:00 (CEST)
- INSEE/Postal code: 08478 /08430
- ^{1} French Land Register data, which excludes lakes, ponds, glaciers > 1 km^{2} (0.386 sq mi or 247 acres) and river estuaries.

Villers-le-Tilleul is a commune in the Ardennes department in northern France.

== Population ==
Historical population
Year	Pop.	±% p.a.
1968	141	—
1975	119	−2.39%
1982	148	+3.16%
1990	176	+2.19%
1999	191	+0.91%
2007	251	+3.47%
2012	248	−0.24%
2017	237	−0.90%
2023	240	+0.21%
Source: INSEE

== See also ==
- Communes of the Ardennes department
