= Hannogne-Saint-Martin =

- Commune
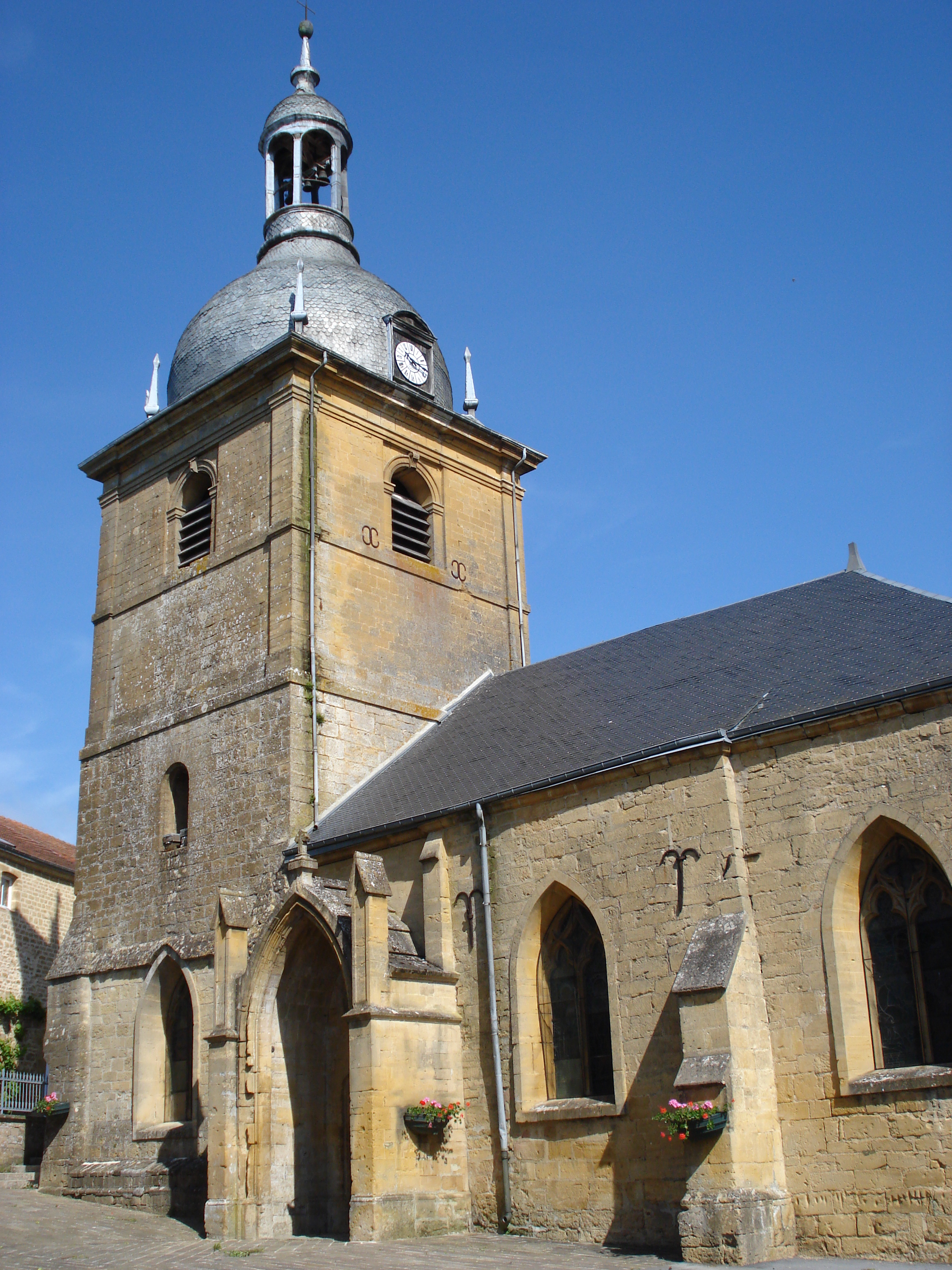
- The church in Hannogne-Saint-Martin

- Coat of arms
- Location of Hannogne-Saint-Martin
- Location within France Location within Grand Est
- Coordinates: 49°40′25″N 4°49′55″E
- Country: France
- Region: Grand Est
- Department: Ardennes
- Arrondissement: Charleville-Mézières
- Canton: Nouvion-sur-Meuse
- Intercommunality: CA Ardenne Métropole

Government
  - Mayor (2020–2026): Michèle Fontaine
- Area^{1}: 4.71 km^{2} (1.82 sq mi)
- Elevation: 250 m (820 ft)
- Highest elevation: 296 m (971 ft)
- Lowest elevation: 147 m (482 ft)
- Population (2023): 445
  - Density: 94.5/km^{2} (245/sq mi)
- Time zone: UTC+01:00 (CET)
  - Summer (DST): UTC+02:00 (CEST)
- INSEE/Postal code: 08209 /08160
- ^{1} French Land Register data, which excludes lakes, ponds, glaciers > 1 km^{2} (0.386 sq mi or 247 acres) and river estuaries.

Hannogne-Saint-Martin (French pronunciation: [anɔɲ sɛ̃ maʁtɛ̃]) is a commune in the Ardennes department and Grand Est region of north-eastern France.

== Population ==
Historical population
| Year | Pop. | ±% p.a. |
|---|---|---|
| 1968 | 461 | — |
| 1975 | 440 | −0.66% |
| 1982 | 430 | −0.33% |
| 1990 | 431 | +0.03% |
| 1999 | 474 | +1.06% |
| 2007 | 476 | +0.05% |
| 2012 | 461 | −0.64% |
| 2017 | 465 | +0.17% |
| 2023 | 445 | −0.73% |
Source: INSEE

== See also ==
- Communes of the Ardennes department
