= Warnécourt =

- Commune
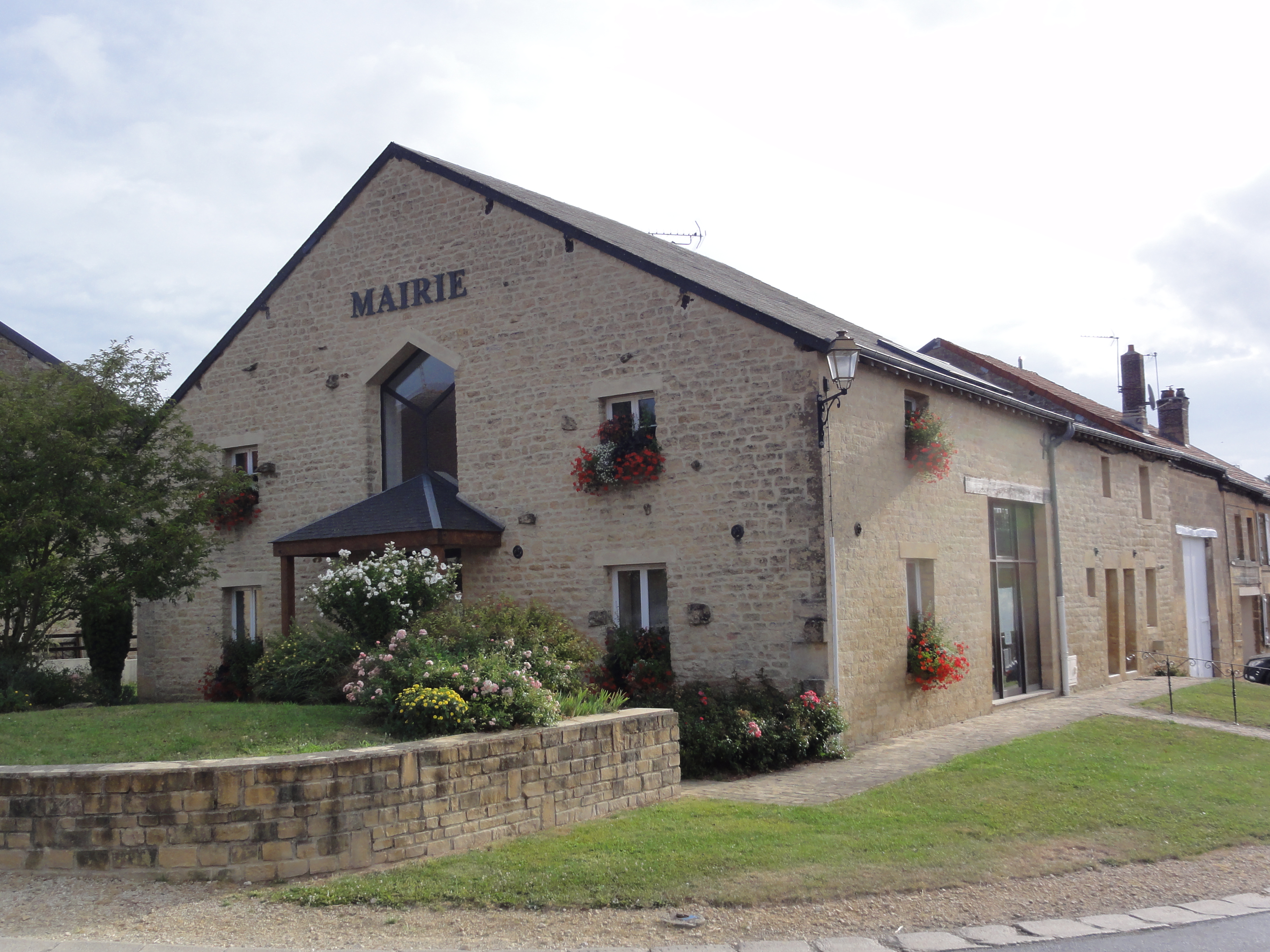
- The town hall in Warnécourt
- Location of Warnécourt
- Location within France Location within Grand Est
- Coordinates: 49°44′01″N 4°39′02″E
- Country: France
- Region: Grand Est
- Department: Ardennes
- Arrondissement: Charleville-Mézières
- Canton: Nouvion-sur-Meuse
- Intercommunality: Crêtes Préardennaises

Government
  - Mayor (2020–2026): Nicolas Poiret
- Area^{1}: 5.36 km^{2} (2.07 sq mi)
- Elevation: 170 m (560 ft)
- Population (2023): 383
  - Density: 71.5/km^{2} (185/sq mi)
- Time zone: UTC+01:00 (CET)
  - Summer (DST): UTC+02:00 (CEST)
- INSEE/Postal code: 08498 /08090
- ^{1} French Land Register data, which excludes lakes, ponds, glaciers > 1 km^{2} (0.386 sq mi or 247 acres) and river estuaries.

Warnécourt is a commune in the Ardennes department in northern France.

== Population ==
Historical population
Year	Pop.	±% p.a.
1968	136	—
1975	168	+3.06%
1982	324	+9.84%
1990	373	+1.78%
1999	387	+0.41%
2007	362	−0.83%
2012	372	+0.55%
2017	372	+0.00%
2023	383	+0.49%
Source: INSEE

== See also ==
- Communes of the Ardennes department
