= Omont =

- Commune
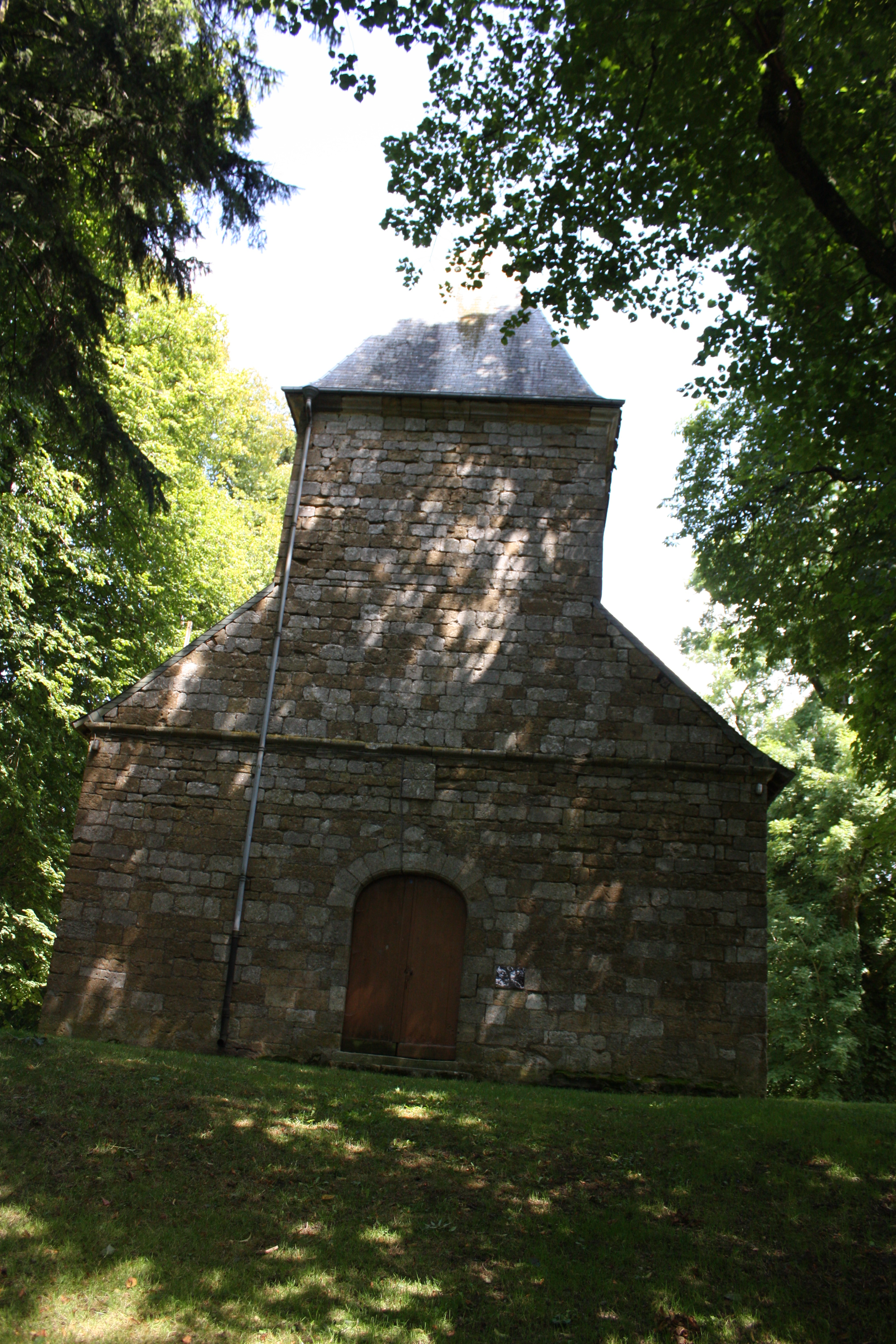
- The church in Omont

- Coat of arms
- Location of Omont
- Location within France Location within Grand Est
- Coordinates: 49°35′53″N 4°43′56″E
- Country: France
- Region: Grand Est
- Department: Ardennes
- Arrondissement: Charleville-Mézières
- Canton: Nouvion-sur-Meuse
- Intercommunality: Crêtes Préardennaises

Government
  - Mayor (2020–2026): Thierry Husson
- Area^{1}: 17.96 km^{2} (6.93 sq mi)
- Elevation: 230 m (750 ft)
- Highest elevation: 297 m (974 ft)
- Lowest elevation: 174 m (571 ft)
- Population (2023): 68
  - Density: 3.8/km^{2} (9.8/sq mi)
- Time zone: UTC+01:00 (CET)
  - Summer (DST): UTC+02:00 (CEST)
- INSEE/Postal code: 08335 /08430
- ^{1} French Land Register data, which excludes lakes, ponds, glaciers > 1 km^{2} (0.386 sq mi or 247 acres) and river estuaries.

Omont (French pronunciation: [ɔmɔ̃]) is a commune in the Ardennes department in northern France.

== Population ==
Historical population
Year	Pop.	±% p.a.
1968	61	—
1975	44	−4.56%
1982	42	−0.66%
1990	52	+2.71%
1999	98	+7.30%
2007	92	−0.79%
2012	81	−2.51%
2017	84	+0.73%
2023	68	−3.46%
Source: INSEE

== See also ==
- Communes of the Ardennes department
