= Communes of the Ardennes department =

The following is a list of the 447 communes of the Ardennes department of France.

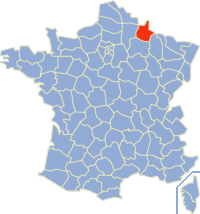

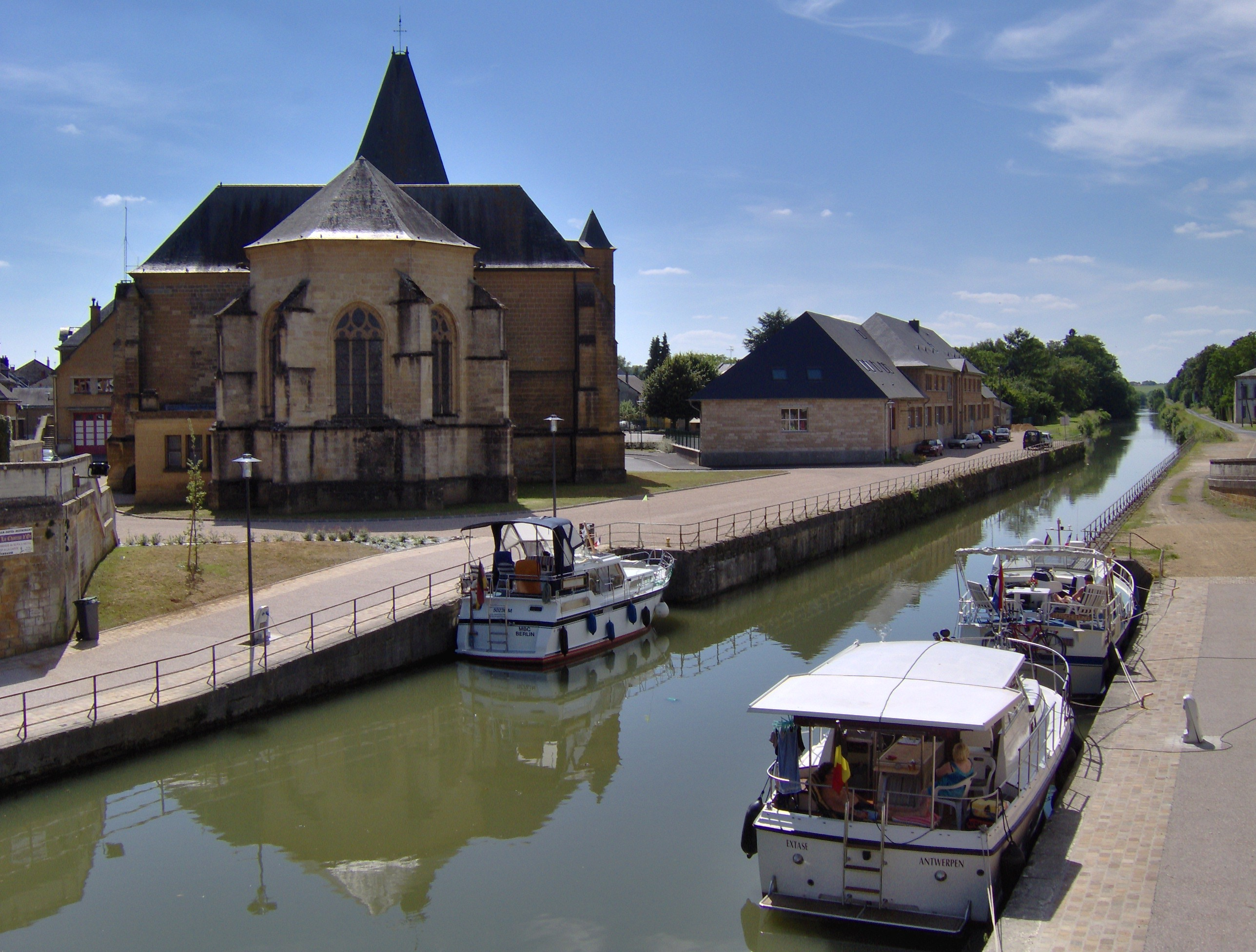

The communes cooperate in the following intercommunalities (as of 2025):

- Communauté d'agglomération Ardenne Métropole
- Communauté de communes Ardenne rives de Meuse
- Communauté de communes Ardennes Thiérache
- Communauté de communes de l'Argonne Ardennaise
- Communauté de communes des Crêtes Préardennaises
- Communauté de communes du Pays Rethélois
- Communauté de communes des Portes du Luxembourg
- Communauté de communes Vallées et Plateau d'Ardenne

INSEE	Postal	Commune
08001	08300	Acy-Romance
08003	08090	Aiglemont
08004	08190	Aire
08005	08310	Alincourt
08006	08130	Alland'Huy-et-Sausseuil
08008	08300	Amagne
08010	08130	Ambly-Fleury
08011	08500	Anchamps
08013	08450	Angecourt
08014	08310	Annelles
08015	08260	Antheny
08016	08290	Aouste
08017	08250	Apremont
08018	08400	Ardeuil-et-Montfauxelles
08021	08300	Arnicourt
08022	08090	Arreux
08023	08390	Artaise-le-Vivier
08024	08190	Asfeld
08025	08130	Attigny
08026	08150	Aubigny-les-Pothées
08027	08270	Auboncourt-Vauzelles
08028	08320	Aubrives
08029	08370	Auflance
08030	08380	Auge
08031	08400	Aure
08032	08310	Aussonce
08033	08240	Authe
08034	08210	Autrecourt-et-Pourron
08035	08240	Autruche
08036	08250	Autry
08037	08260	Auvillers-les-Forges
08038	08300	Avançon
08039	08190	Avaux
08040	08000	Les Ayvelles
08041	08430	Baâlons
08116	08390	Bairon-et-ses-Environs
08043	08200	Balan
08044	08190	Balham
08045	08400	Ballay
08046	08220	Banogne-Recouvrance
08047	08430	Barbaise
08048	08300	Barby
08049	08240	Bar-lès-Buzancy
08052	08240	Bayonville
08053	08140	Bazeilles
08055	08210	Beaumont-en-Argonne
08056	08250	Beffu-et-le-Morthomme
08057	08240	Belleville-et-Châtillon-sur-Bar
08058	08090	Belval
08059	08240	Belval-Bois-des-Dames
08060	08300	Bergnicourt
08061	08240	La Berlière
08062	08300	Bertoncourt
08063	08450	La Besace
08064	08300	Biermes
08065	08370	Bièvres
08066	08310	Bignicourt
08067	08110	Blagny
08069	08290	Blanchefosse-et-Bay
08070	08190	Blanzy-la-Salonnaise
08071	08260	Blombay
08081	08120	Bogny-sur-Meuse
08073	08290	Bossus-lès-Rumigny
08074	08250	Bouconville
08075	08240	Boult-aux-Bois
08076	08410	Boulzicourt
08077	08400	Bourcq
08078	08230	Bourg-Fidèle
08080	08430	Bouvellemont
08082	08400	Brécy-Brières
08083	08140	Brévilly
08084	08190	Brienne-sur-Aisne
08085	08240	Brieulles-sur-Bar
08086	08240	Briquenay
08087	08380	Brognon
08088	08450	Bulson
08089	08240	Buzancy
08090	08110	Carignan
08092	08310	Cauroy
08094	08260	Cernion
08095	08430	Chagny
08096	08160	Chalandry-Elaire
08097	08400	Challerange
08098	08250	Champigneulle
08099	08430	Champigneul-sur-Vence
08100	08260	Champlin
08101	08200	La Chapelle
08102	08220	Chappes
08103	08130	Charbogne
08104	08400	Chardeny
08105	08000	Charleville-Mézières
08106	08600	Charnois
08107	08360	Château-Porcien
08109	08250	Chatel-Chéhéry
08111	08300	Le Châtelet-sur-Retourne
08110	08150	Le Châtelet-sur-Sormonne
08113	08220	Chaumont-Porcien
08115	08450	Chémery-Chéhéry
08117	08270	Chesnois-Auboncourt
08119	08350	Cheveuges
08120	08250	Chevières
08121	08260	Chilly
08122	08600	Chooz
08123	08130	Chuffilly-Roche
08124	08460	Clavy-Warby
08125	08090	Cliron
08128	08250	Condé-lès-Autry
08126	08360	Condé-lès-Herpy
08130	08400	Contreuve
08131	08250	Cornay
08132	08270	Corny-Machéroménil
08133	08300	Coucy
08134	08130	Coulommes-et-Marqueny
08135	08400	La Croix-aux-Bois
08136	08140	Daigny
08137	08090	Damouzy
08138	08110	Les Deux-Villes
08139	08800	Deville
08140	08160	Dom-le-Mesnil
08141	08460	Dommery
08142	08350	Donchery
08143	08220	Doumely-Bégny
08144	08300	Doux
08145	08140	Douzy
08146	08220	Draize
08147	08310	Dricourt
08148	08300	L'Écaille
08149	08150	L'Échelle
08150	08300	Écly
08151	08130	Écordal
08153	08110	Escombres-et-le-Chesnois
08154	08260	Estrebay
08155	08260	Étalle
08156	08260	Éteignières
08158	08160	Étrépigny
08159	08210	Euilly-et-Lombut
08160	08090	Évigny
08161	08250	Exermont
08162	08090	Fagnon
08163	08270	Faissault
08164	08400	Falaise
08165	08270	Faux
08166	08170	Fépin
08167	08290	La Férée
08168	08370	La Ferté-sur-Chiers
08169	08260	Flaignes-Havys
08170	08200	Fleigneux
08171	08250	Fléville
08172	08380	Fligny
08173	08160	Flize
08174	08200	Floing
08175	08600	Foisches
08176	08240	Fossé
08178	08220	Fraillicourt
08179	08140	Francheval
08180	08000	La Francheville
08182	08290	Le Fréty
08183	08600	Fromelennes
08184	08370	Fromy
08185	08170	Fumay
08186	08240	Germont
08187	08440	Gernelle
08188	08700	Gespunsart
08189	08260	Girondelle
08190	08600	Givet
08191	08200	Givonne
08192	08220	Givron
08193	08130	Givry
08194	08200	Glaire
08195	08190	Gomont
08196	08270	Grandchamp
08019	08390	Les Grandes-Armoises
08197	08250	Grandham
08198	08250	Grandpré
08199	08700	La Grandville
08200	08400	Grivy-Loisy
08201	08430	Gruyères
08202	08230	Gué-d'Hossus
08203	08430	Guignicourt-sur-Vence
08204	08130	Guincourt
08205	08430	Hagnicourt
08206	08090	Ham-les-Moines
08207	08600	Ham-sur-Meuse
08208	08290	Hannappes
08209	08160	Hannogne-Saint-Martin
08210	08220	Hannogne-Saint-Rémy
08211	08450	Haraucourt
08212	08150	Harcy
08214	08170	Hargnies
08215	08240	Harricourt
08216	08090	Haudrecy
08217	08800	Haulmé
08218	08800	Les Hautes-Rivières
08219	08300	Hauteville
08220	08310	Hauviné
08222	08170	Haybes
08223	08370	Herbeuval
08225	08360	Herpy-l'Arlésienne
08226	08320	Hierges
08228	08430	La Horgne
08229	08190	Houdilcourt
08230	08090	Houldizy
08232	08200	Illy
08233	08240	Imécourt
08234	08300	Inaumont
08235	08440	Issancourt-et-Rumel
08236	08430	Jandun
08237	08700	Joigny-sur-Meuse
08238	08130	Jonval
08239	08310	Juniville
08240	08270	Justine-Herbigny
08242	08800	Laifour
08243	08460	Lalobbe
08244	08130	Lametz
08245	08250	Lançon
08246	08240	Landres-et-Saint-Georges
08247	08600	Landrichamps
08248	08430	Launois-sur-Vence
08249	08150	Laval-Morency
08250	08310	Leffincourt
08251	08150	Lépron-les-Vallées
08252	08210	Létanne
08254	08290	Liart
08255	08110	Linay
08256	08400	Liry

INSEE	Postal	Commune
08257	08150	Logny-Bogny
08259	08400	Longwé
08260	08150	Lonny
08262	08300	Lucquy
08263	08440	Lumes
08264	08310	Machault
08268	08450	Maisoncelle-et-Villers
08269	08370	Malandry
08271	08400	Manre
08272	08460	Maranwez
08273	08260	Marby
08274	08250	Marcq
08275	08370	Margny
08276	08370	Margut
08277	08290	Marlemont
08278	08390	Marquigny
08279	08400	Mars-sous-Bourcq
08280	08400	Marvaux-Vieux
08281	08110	Matton-et-Clémency
08282	08260	Maubert-Fontaine
08283	08430	Mazerny
08284	08500	Les Mazures
08286	08310	Ménil-Annelles
08287	08310	Ménil-Lépinois
08288	08270	Mesmont
08289	08110	Messincourt
08291	08110	Mogues
08293	08370	Moiry
08295	08430	Mondigny
08296	08250	Montcheutin
08297	08090	Montcornet
08298	08090	Montcy-Notre-Dame
08301	08390	Montgon
08302	08800	Monthermé
08303	08400	Monthois
08304	08170	Montigny-sur-Meuse
08305	08430	Montigny-sur-Vence
08306	08130	Mont-Laurent
08307	08220	Montmeillant
08308	08400	Mont-Saint-Martin
08309	08310	Mont-Saint-Remy
08310	08250	Mouron
08311	08210	Mouzon
08312	08150	Murtin-et-Bogny
08313	08300	Nanteuil-sur-Aisne
08314	08300	Neuflize
08315	08460	Neufmaison
08316	08700	Neufmanil
08317	08450	La Neuville-à-Maire
08318	08380	La Neuville-aux-Joûtes
08321	08130	Neuville-Day
08320	08310	La Neuville-en-Tourne-à-Fuy
08322	08090	Neuville-lès-This
08323	08270	La Neuville-lès-Wasigny
08319	08380	Neuville-lez-Beaulieu
08324	08430	Neuvizy
08325	08400	Noirval
08326	08240	Nouart
08327	08160	Nouvion-sur-Meuse
08328	08700	Nouzonville
08329	08270	Novion-Porcien
08330	08300	Novy-Chevrières
08331	08350	Noyers-Pont-Maugis
08332	08240	Oches
08333	08250	Olizy-Primat
08334	08450	Omicourt
08335	08430	Omont
08336	08110	Osnes
08338	08310	Pauvres
08339	08300	Perthes
08020	08390	Les Petites-Armoises
08340	08190	Poilcourt-Sydney
08341	08430	Poix-Terron
08342	08140	Pouru-aux-Bois
08343	08140	Pouru-Saint-Remy
08344	08290	Prez
08346	08000	Prix-lès-Mézières
08347	08370	Puilly-et-Charbeaux
08348	08270	Puiseux
08349	08110	Pure
08350	08400	Quatre-Champs
08351	08400	Quilly
08352	08430	Raillicourt
08353	08600	Rancennes
08354	08450	Raucourt-et-Flaba
08355	08230	Regniowez
08356	08220	Remaucourt
08357	08450	Remilly-Aillicourt
08358	08150	Remilly-les-Pothées
08360	08220	Renneville
08361	08150	Renwez
08362	08300	Rethel
08363	08500	Revin
08364	08130	Rilly-sur-Aisne
08365	08150	Rimogne
08366	08220	Rocquigny
08367	08230	Rocroi
08368	08190	Roizy
08369	08220	La Romagne
08370	08150	Rouvroy-sur-Audry
08372	08220	Rubigny
08373	08290	Rumigny
08374	08130	La Sabotterie
08375	08110	Sachy
08376	08110	Sailly
08377	08350	Saint-Aignan
08378	08310	Saint-Clément-à-Arnes
08390	08400	Sainte-Marie
08379	08310	Saint-Étienne-à-Arnes
08398	08130	Sainte-Vaubourg
08380	08360	Saint-Fergeux
08381	08190	Saint-Germainmont
08382	08220	Saint-Jean-aux-Bois
08383	08250	Saint-Juvin
08384	08130	Saint-Lambert-et-Mont-de-Jeux
08385	08090	Saint-Laurent
08386	08300	Saint-Loup-en-Champagne
08387	08130	Saint-Loup-Terrier
08388	08160	Saint-Marceau
08389	08460	Saint-Marcel
08391	08200	Saint-Menges
08392	08400	Saint-Morel
08393	08310	Saint-Pierre-à-Arnes
08394	08240	Saint-Pierremont
08395	08430	Saint-Pierre-sur-Vence
08396	08220	Saint-Quentin-le-Petit
08397	08300	Saint-Remy-le-Petit
08400	08160	Sapogne-et-Feuchères
08399	08370	Sapogne-sur-Marche
08401	08130	Saulces-Champenoises
08402	08270	Saulces-Monclin
08403	08300	Sault-lès-Rethel
08404	08190	Sault-Saint-Remy
08405	08390	Sauville
08406	08400	Savigny-sur-Aisne
08407	08250	Séchault
08408	08150	Sécheval
08409	08200	Sedan
08410	08400	Semide
08411	08130	Semuy
08412	08250	Senuc
08413	08220	Seraincourt
08415	08270	Sery
08416	08300	Seuil
08417	08230	Sévigny-la-Forêt
08418	08220	Sévigny-Waleppe
08419	08460	Signy-l'Abbaye
08420	08380	Signy-le-Petit
08421	08370	Signy-Montlibert
08422	08430	Singly
08424	08240	Sommauthe
08425	08250	Sommerance
08426	08300	Son
08427	08300	Sorbon
08428	08270	Sorcy-Bauthémont
08429	08150	Sormonne
08430	08390	Stonne
08431	08400	Sugny
08432	08090	Sury
08433	08130	Suzanne
08434	08390	Sy
08435	08300	Tagnon
08436	08230	Taillette
08437	08240	Tailly
08438	08360	Taizy
08439	08390	Tannay-le-Mont-Dieu
08440	08380	Tarzy
08444	08110	Tétaigne
08445	08350	Thelonne
08446	08240	Thénorgues
08448	08800	Thilay
08449	08460	Thin-le-Moutier
08450	08090	This
08451	08190	Le Thour
08452	08300	Thugny-Trugny
08453	08400	Toges
08454	08430	Touligny
08455	08400	Tourcelles-Chaumont
08456	08800	Tournavaux
08457	08090	Tournes
08458	08130	Tourteron
08459	08110	Tremblois-lès-Carignan
08460	08150	Tremblois-lès-Rocroi
08461	08400	Vandy
08462	08130	Vaux-Champagne
08463	08240	Vaux-en-Dieulet
08464	08250	Vaux-lès-Mouron
08466	08210	Vaux-lès-Mouzon
08465	08220	Vaux-lès-Rubigny
08467	08270	Vaux-Montreuil
08468	08150	Vaux-Villaine
08469	08160	Vendresse
08470	08240	Verpel
08471	08390	Verrières
08472	08270	Viel-Saint-Remy
08473	08190	Vieux-lès-Asfeld
08476	08190	Villers-devant-le-Thour
08477	08210	Villers-devant-Mouzon
08478	08430	Villers-le-Tilleul
08479	08430	Villers-le-Tourneur
08480	08000	Villers-Semeuse
08481	08350	Villers-sur-Bar
08482	08430	Villers-sur-le-Mont
08483	08440	Ville-sur-Lumes
08484	08310	Ville-sur-Retourne
08485	08370	Villy
08486	08320	Vireux-Molhain
08487	08320	Vireux-Wallerand
08488	08440	Vivier-au-Court
08489	08400	Voncq
08490	08400	Vouziers
08491	08330	Vrigne-aux-Bois
08492	08350	Vrigne-Meuse
08494	08200	Wadelincourt
08496	08270	Wagnon
08497	08000	Warcq
08498	08090	Warnécourt
08499	08270	Wasigny
08500	08270	Wignicourt
08501	08110	Williers
08502	08210	Yoncq
08503	08430	Yvernaumont
