= Touligny =

- Commune
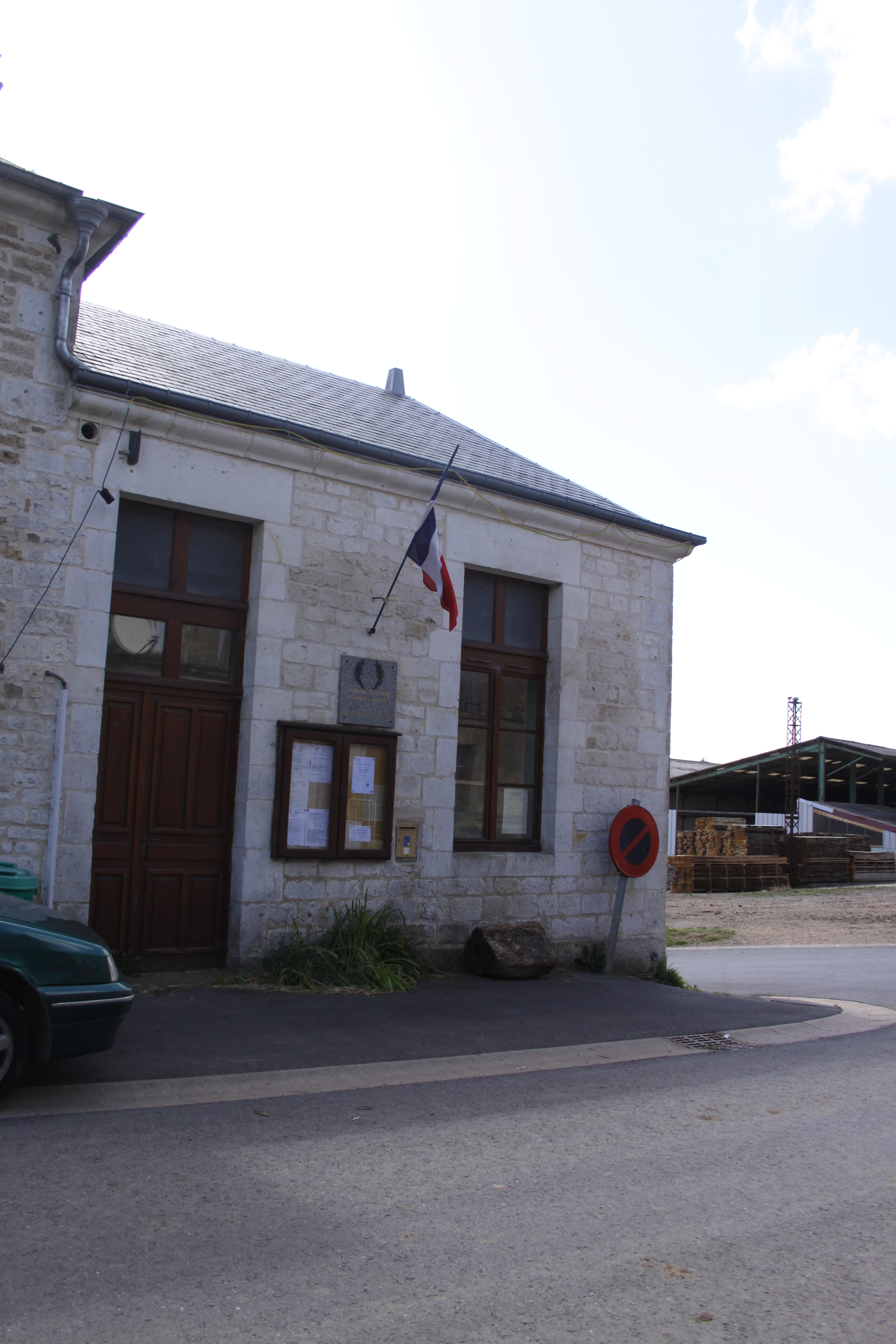
- Town hall

- Coat of arms
- Location of Touligny
- Location within France Location within Grand Est
- Coordinates: 49°40′15″N 4°37′01″E
- Country: France
- Region: Grand Est
- Department: Ardennes
- Arrondissement: Charleville-Mézières
- Canton: Nouvion-sur-Meuse
- Intercommunality: Crêtes Préardennaises

Government
  - Mayor (2023–2026): Caroline Defontaine
- Area^{1}: 7.28 km^{2} (2.81 sq mi)
- Elevation: 270 m (890 ft)
- Population (2023): 83
  - Density: 11/km^{2} (30/sq mi)
- Time zone: UTC+01:00 (CET)
  - Summer (DST): UTC+02:00 (CEST)
- INSEE/Postal code: 08454 /08430
- ^{1} French Land Register data, which excludes lakes, ponds, glaciers > 1 km^{2} (0.386 sq mi or 247 acres) and river estuaries.

Touligny (French pronunciation: [tuliɲi]) is a commune in the Ardennes department in northern France.

== Population ==
Historical population
Year	Pop.	±% p.a.
1968	80	—
1975	80	+0.00%
1982	71	−1.69%
1990	89	+2.86%
1999	89	+0.00%
2007	68	−3.31%
2012	82	+3.82%
2017	85	+0.72%
2023	83	−0.40%
Source: INSEE

== See also ==
- Communes of the Ardennes department
