= Boulzicourt =

- Commune
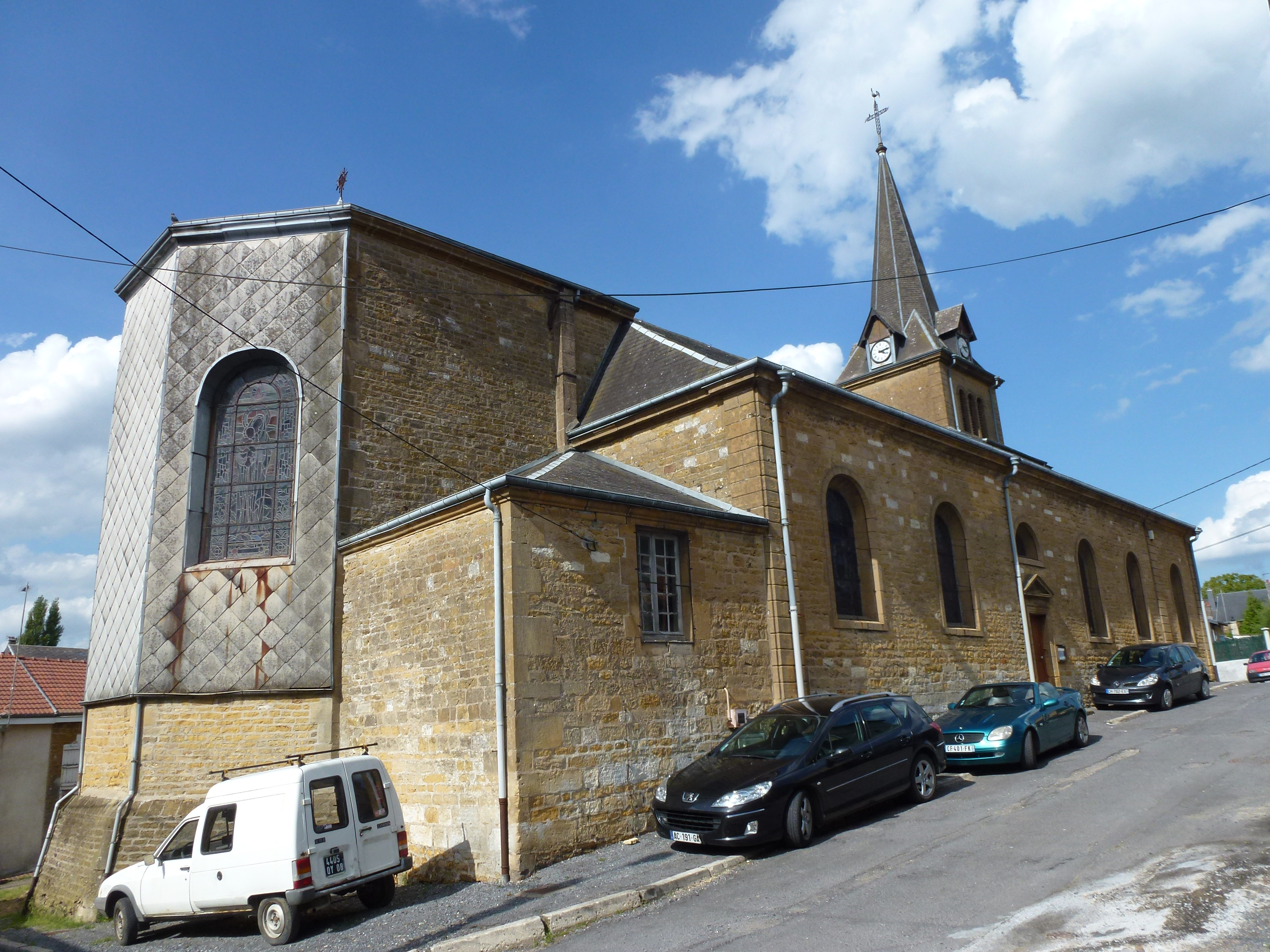
- The church in Boulzicourt

- Coat of arms
- Location of Boulzicourt
- Location within France Location within Grand Est
- Coordinates: 49°41′43″N 4°41′47″E
- Country: France
- Region: Grand Est
- Department: Ardennes
- Arrondissement: Charleville-Mézières
- Canton: Nouvion-sur-Meuse
- Intercommunality: Crêtes Préardennaises

Government
  - Mayor (2020–2026): Pascal Mauroy
- Area^{1}: 6.65 km^{2} (2.57 sq mi)
- Elevation: 164 m (538 ft)
- Population (2023): 966
  - Density: 145/km^{2} (376/sq mi)
- Time zone: UTC+01:00 (CET)
  - Summer (DST): UTC+02:00 (CEST)
- INSEE/Postal code: 08076 /08410
- ^{1} French Land Register data, which excludes lakes, ponds, glaciers > 1 km^{2} (0.386 sq mi or 247 acres) and river estuaries.

Boulzicourt (French pronunciation: [bulzikuʁ]) is a commune in the Ardennes department in northern France. It lies on the river Vence.

== Population ==
Historical population
Year	Pop.	±% p.a.
1968	881	—
1975	921	+0.64%
1982	825	−1.56%
1990	1,006	+2.51%
1999	1,003	−0.03%
2007	954	−0.62%
2012	959	+0.10%
2017	958	−0.02%
2023	966	+0.14%
Source: INSEE

== See also ==
- Communes of the Ardennes department
