= Nouvion-sur-Meuse =

- Commune
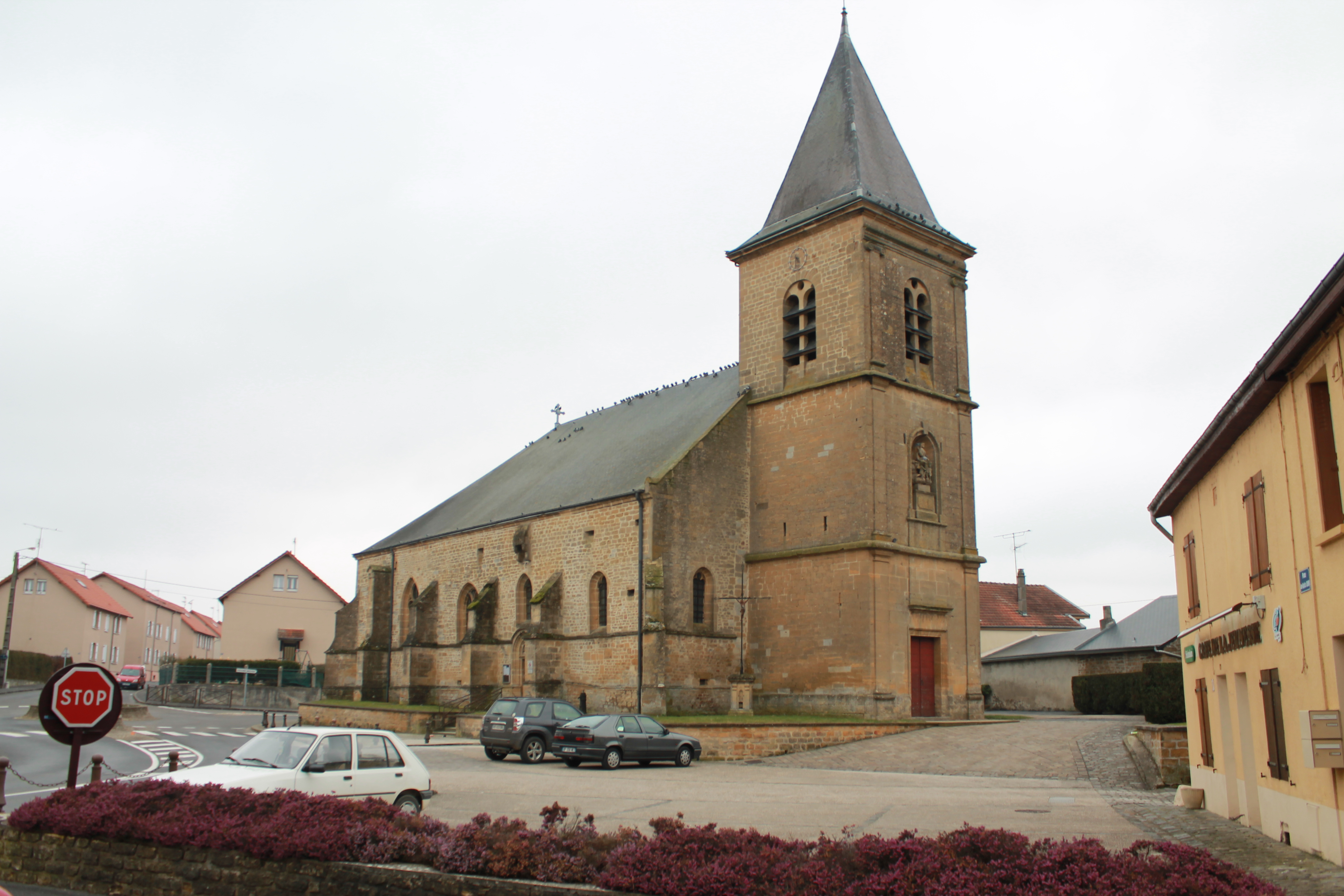
- The church in Nouvion-sur-Meuse

- Coat of arms
- Location of Nouvion-sur-Meuse
- Location within France Location within Grand Est
- Coordinates: 49°42′02″N 4°47′45″E
- Country: France
- Region: Grand Est
- Department: Ardennes
- Arrondissement: Charleville-Mézières
- Canton: Nouvion-sur-Meuse
- Intercommunality: CA Ardenne Métropole

Government
  - Mayor (2020–2026): Jean-Luc Claude
- Area^{1}: 9.06 km^{2} (3.50 sq mi)
- Elevation: 149 m (489 ft)
- Highest elevation: 250 m (820 ft)
- Lowest elevation: 145 m (476 ft)
- Population (2023): 2,249
  - Density: 248/km^{2} (643/sq mi)
- Time zone: UTC+01:00 (CET)
  - Summer (DST): UTC+02:00 (CEST)
- INSEE/Postal code: 08327 /08160
- ^{1} French Land Register data, which excludes lakes, ponds, glaciers > 1 km^{2} (0.386 sq mi or 247 acres) and river estuaries.

Nouvion-sur-Meuse (French pronunciation: [nuvjɔ̃ syʁ møz], literally Nouvion on Meuse) is a commune in the Ardennes department in northern France.

== Population ==
Historical population
Year	Pop.	±% p.a.
1968	2,808	—
1975	2,627	−0.95%
1982	2,308	−1.83%
1990	2,256	−0.28%
1999	2,193	−0.31%
2007	2,195	+0.01%
2012	2,263	+0.61%
2017	2,250	−0.12%
2023	2,249	−0.01%
Source: INSEE

== See also ==
- Communes of the Ardennes department
