= Singly =

- Commune
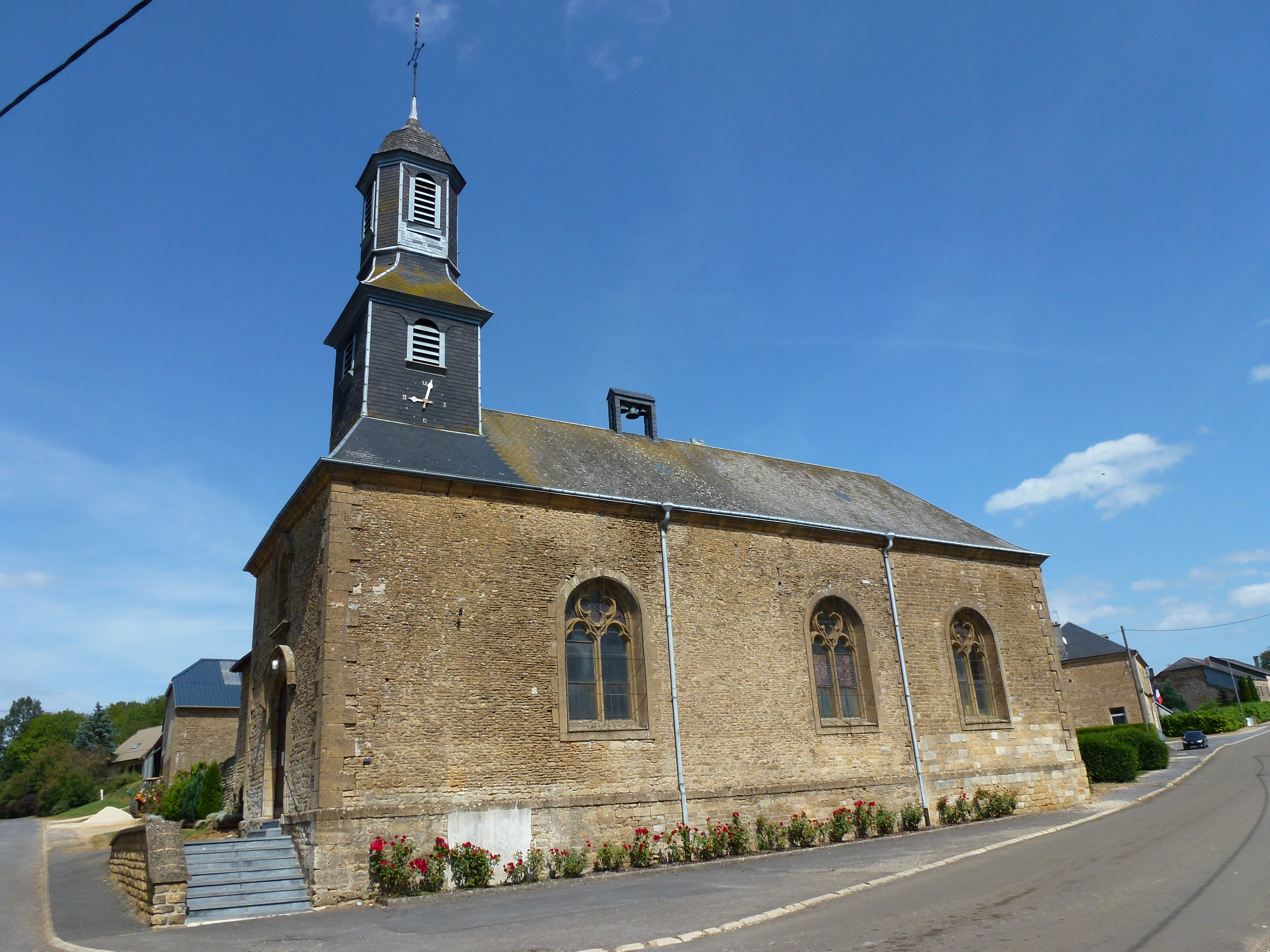
- The church in Singly

- Coat of arms
- Location of Singly
- Location within France Location within Grand Est
- Coordinates: 49°38′34″N 4°42′05″E
- Country: France
- Region: Grand Est
- Department: Ardennes
- Arrondissement: Charleville-Mézières
- Canton: Nouvion-sur-Meuse
- Intercommunality: Crêtes Préardennaises

Government
  - Mayor (2020–2026): Jean-Luc Pêtre
- Area^{1}: 9.92 km^{2} (3.83 sq mi)
- Elevation: 250 m (820 ft)
- Population (2023): 139
  - Density: 14.0/km^{2} (36.3/sq mi)
- Time zone: UTC+01:00 (CET)
  - Summer (DST): UTC+02:00 (CEST)
- INSEE/Postal code: 08422 /08430
- ^{1} French Land Register data, which excludes lakes, ponds, glaciers > 1 km^{2} (0.386 sq mi or 247 acres) and river estuaries.

Singly (French pronunciation: [sɛ̃ɡli]) is a commune in the Ardennes department in northern France.

== See also ==
- Communes of the Ardennes department
