= Mondigny =

- Commune
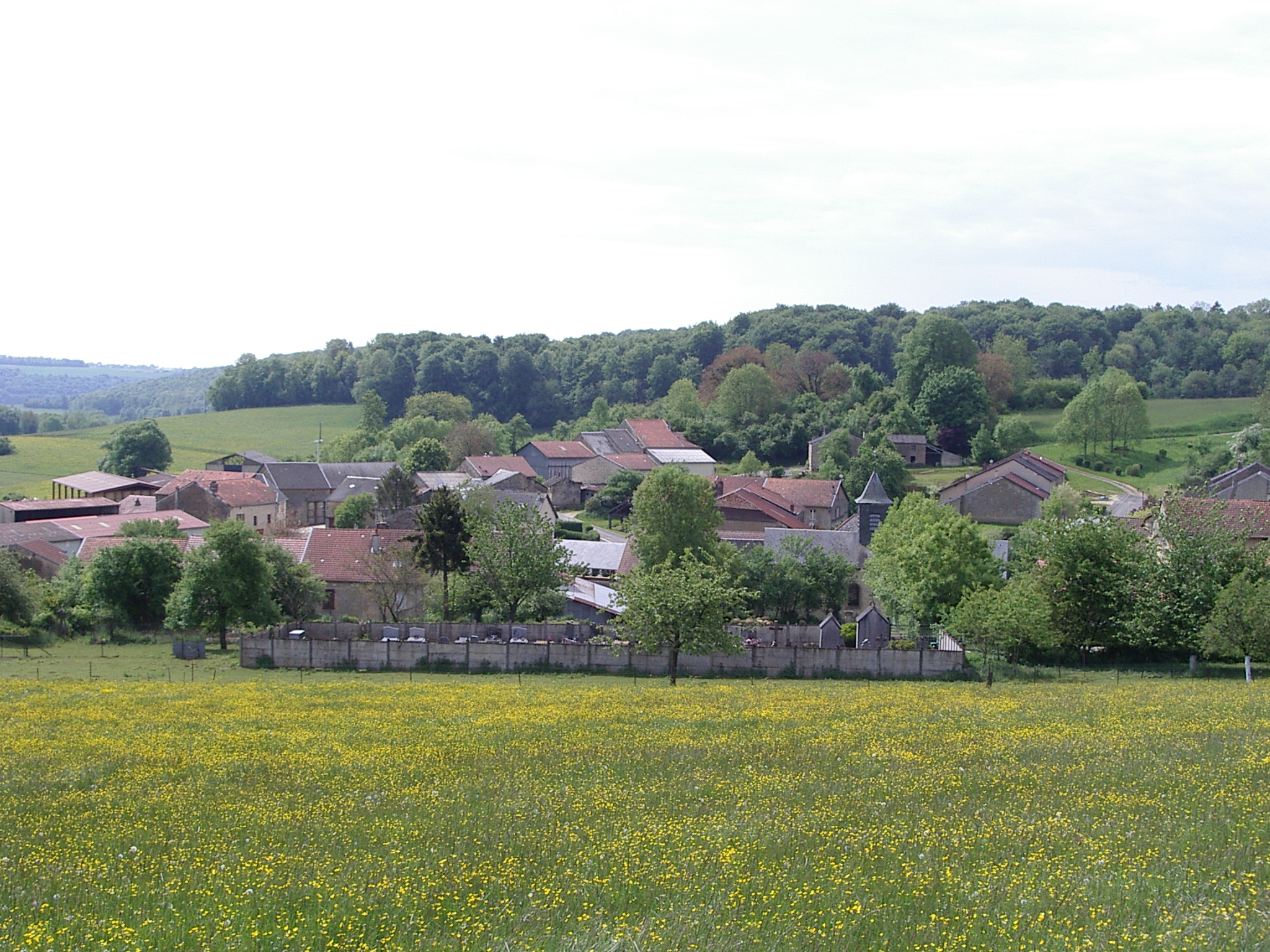
- A general view of Mondigny
- Location of Mondigny
- Location within France Location within Grand Est
- Coordinates: 49°42′39″N 4°38′21″E
- Country: France
- Region: Grand Est
- Department: Ardennes
- Arrondissement: Charleville-Mézières
- Canton: Nouvion-sur-Meuse
- Intercommunality: Crêtes Préardennaises

Government
  - Mayor (2020–2026): Daniel Thomas
- Area^{1}: 5.9 km^{2} (2.3 sq mi)
- Elevation: 240 m (790 ft)
- Population (2023): 185
  - Density: 31/km^{2} (81/sq mi)
- Time zone: UTC+01:00 (CET)
  - Summer (DST): UTC+02:00 (CEST)
- INSEE/Postal code: 08295 /08430
- ^{1} French Land Register data, which excludes lakes, ponds, glaciers > 1 km^{2} (0.386 sq mi or 247 acres) and river estuaries.

Mondigny (French pronunciation: [mɔ̃diɲi]) is a commune in the Ardennes department in northern France.

== Population ==
Historical population
Year	Pop.	±% p.a.
1968	83	—
1975	90	+1.16%
1982	131	+5.51%
1990	150	+1.71%
1999	147	−0.22%
2007	183	+2.78%
2012	176	−0.78%
2017	171	−0.57%
2023	185	+1.32%
Source: INSEE

== See also ==
- Communes of the Ardennes department
