= Launois-sur-Vence =

- Commune
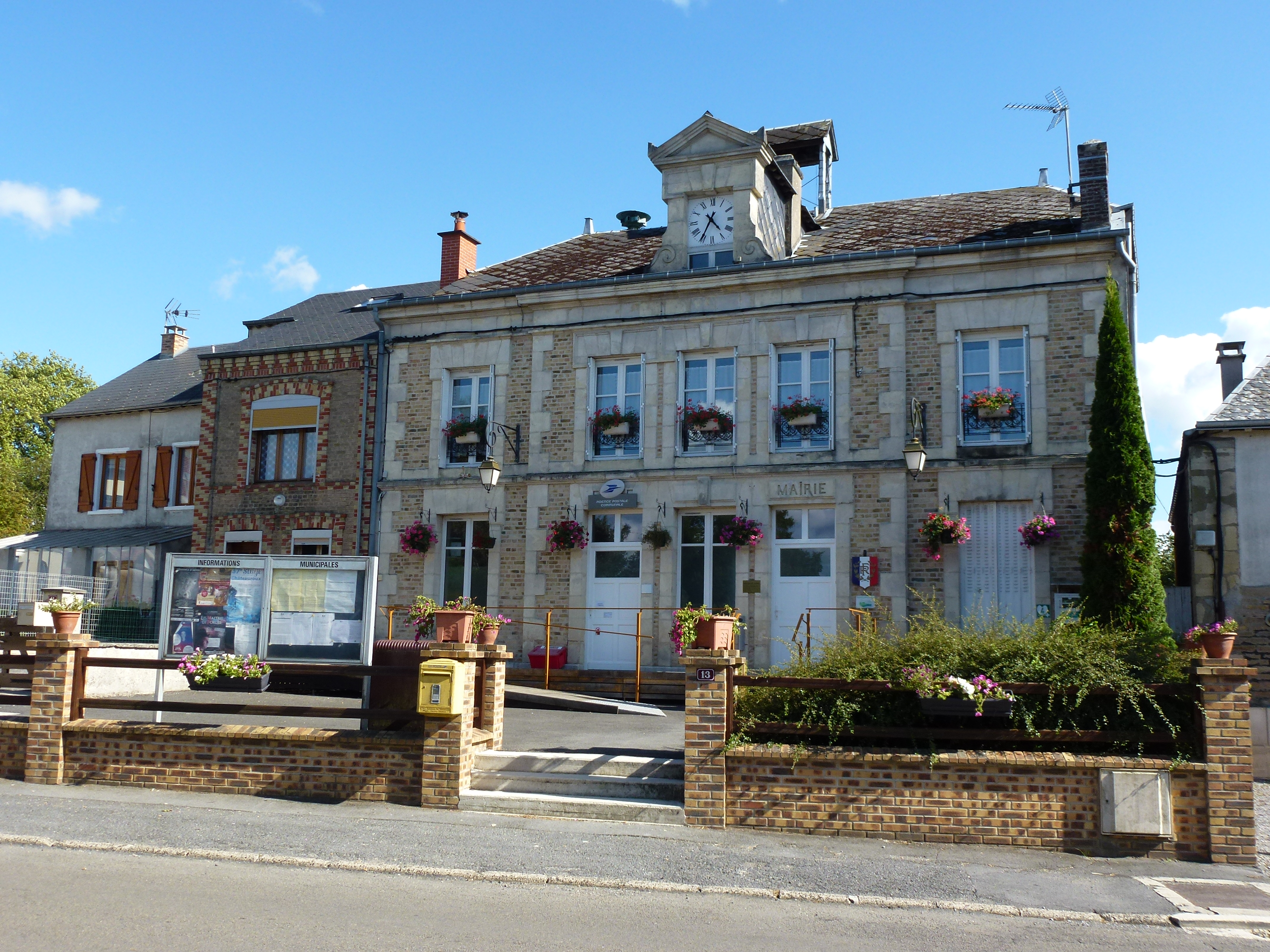
- The town hall in Launois-sur-Vence

- Coat of arms
- Location of Launois-sur-Vence
- Location within France Location within Grand Est
- Coordinates: 49°39′14″N 4°32′19″E
- Country: France
- Region: Grand Est
- Department: Ardennes
- Arrondissement: Charleville-Mézières
- Canton: Signy-l'Abbaye
- Intercommunality: Crêtes Préardennaises

Government
  - Mayor (2020–2026): Janick Lombard
- Area^{1}: 13.37 km^{2} (5.16 sq mi)
- Elevation: 207 m (679 ft)
- Population (2023): 659
  - Density: 49.3/km^{2} (128/sq mi)
- Time zone: UTC+01:00 (CET)
  - Summer (DST): UTC+02:00 (CEST)
- INSEE/Postal code: 08248 /08430
- ^{1} French Land Register data, which excludes lakes, ponds, glaciers > 1 km^{2} (0.386 sq mi or 247 acres) and river estuaries.

Launois-sur-Vence (French pronunciation: [lonwa syʁ vɑ̃s]) is a commune in the Ardennes department in northern France. The source of the river Vence is in the commune.

The commune is listed as a Village étape.

== Population ==
Historical population
Year	Pop.	±% p.a.
1968	560	—
1975	520	−1.05%
1982	532	+0.33%
1990	578	+1.04%
1999	561	−0.33%
2007	577	+0.35%
2012	673	+3.13%
2017	699	+0.76%
2023	659	−0.98%
Source: INSEE

== Notable people ==
- Jules Mary (1851-1922) was a French novelist

== See also ==
- Communes of the Ardennes department
