= Vence (river) =

River in France

- Location within France Location within Grand Est

Location
- Country: France

Physical characteristics
- Mouth: Meuse
  - coordinates: 49°45′20″N 04°44′08″E
- Length: 32.6 km (20.3 mi)

Basin features
- Progression: Meuse→ North Sea

The Vence is a 32.6 km (20.3 mi) long river in the Ardennes department, northeastern France. Its source is at Launois-sur-Vence. It flows generally northeast. It is a left tributary of the Meuse into which it flows in Charleville-Mézières. The motorway A34 and the railway from Charleville-Mézières to Reims run through part of the valley of the Vence.
