= Canton of Buzancy =

Former canton in Ardennes, France

Coordinates: 49°25′03″N 4°55′40″E

- Former canton
- Location of the canton in the arrondissement of Vouziers
- Country: France
- Region: Grand Est
- Department: Ardennes
- No. of communes: {{{nbcomm}}}
- Disbanded: 2015

Government
  - Representatives: Pierre Vernel
- Area: 265.06 km^{2} (102.34 sq mi)
- Population (2012): 1,841
  - Density: 6.946/km^{2} (17.99/sq mi)

The canton of Buzancy (French: Canton de Buzancy) is a former French canton located in the department of Ardennes in the Champagne-Ardenne region (now part of Grand Est). This canton was organized around Buzancy in the arrondissement of Vouziers. It is now part of the canton of Vouziers.

The last general councillor from this canton was Pierre Vernel (UMP), elected in 2008.

== Composition ==
The canton of Buzancy grouped together 18 municipalities and had 1,841 inhabitants (2012 census without double counts).

1. Buzancy
2. Bar-lès-Buzancy
3. Bayonville
4. Belval-Bois-des-Dames
5. La Berlière
6. Briquenay
7. Fossé
8. Harricourt
9. Imécourt
10. Landres-et-Saint-Georges
11. Nouart
12. Oches
13. Saint-Pierremont
14. Sommauthe
15. Tailly
16. Thénorgues
17. Vaux-en-Dieulet
18. Verpel
