= Angecourt =

- Commune
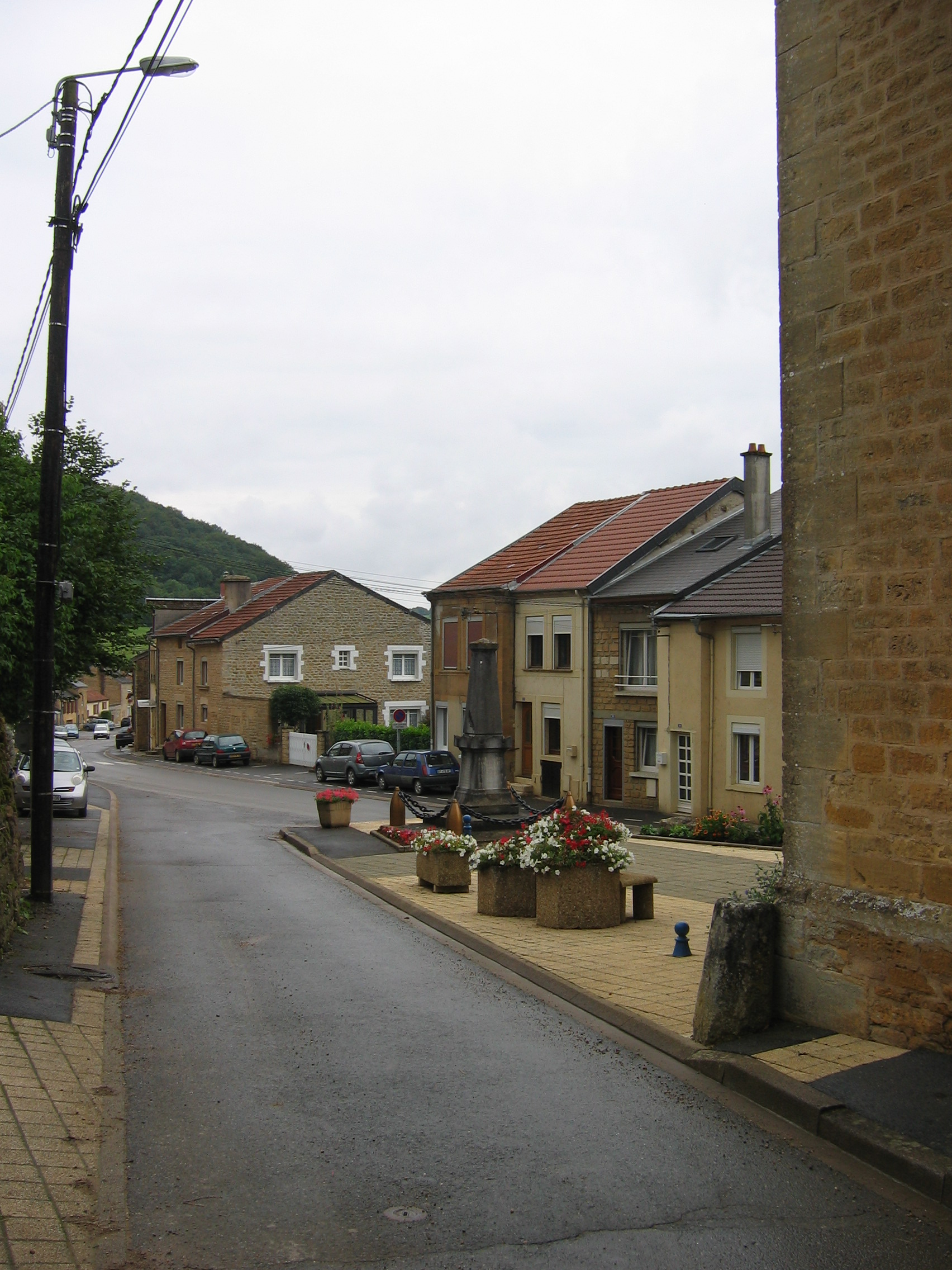
- Angecourt village

- Coat of arms
- Location of Angecourt
- Location within France Location within Grand Est
- Coordinates: 49°38′06″N 4°58′47″E
- Country: France
- Region: Grand Est
- Department: Ardennes
- Arrondissement: Sedan
- Canton: Vouziers
- Intercommunality: Portes du Luxembourg

Government
  - Mayor (2020–2026): Frédérique Kretzmeyer Zaltani
- Area^{1}: 3.73 km^{2} (1.44 sq mi)
- Elevation: 270 m (890 ft)
- Highest elevation: 307 m (1,007 ft)
- Lowest elevation: 161 m (528 ft)
- Population (2023): 382
  - Density: 102/km^{2} (265/sq mi)
- Time zone: UTC+01:00 (CET)
  - Summer (DST): UTC+02:00 (CEST)
- INSEE/Postal code: 08013 /08450
- ^{1} French Land Register data, which excludes lakes, ponds, glaciers > 1 km^{2} (0.386 sq mi or 247 acres) and river estuaries.

Angecourt (French pronunciation: [ɑ̃ʒkuʁ]) is a commune in the Ardennes department in the Grand Est region of northern France.

The commune has been awarded one flower by the National Council of Towns and Villages in Bloom in the Competition of cities and villages in Bloom.

== Geography ==
Angecourt is located some 8 km south-east of Sedan and 7 km north-west of Mouzon. Access to the commune is by road D6 from Remilly-Aillicourt in the north-east which passes through the commune and the village and continues to Haraucourt in the south-west. About half of the commune in the south and east is forested with the rest farmland.

The Ennemane flows through the commune from south-west to north-east to join the Coupure de Remilly at Remilly-Aillicourt.

== History ==
- From 1560 to 1642 Angecourt was part of the Principality of Sedan.
- Battle of Sedan (1940)

=== Heraldry ===
Arms of Angecourt	The official status of the blazon remains to be determined Blazon: Azure, a chevron of Or accompanied in chief at dexter a horsehead regardant, at sinister two annulets interlaced, at nombril point a mullet of six points pierced, all of Argent.

== Administration ==
List of Successive Mayors

From	To	Name
2001	2020	Jean-Claude Philippe
2020	Current	Frédérique Kretzmeyer Zaltani

== Population ==
The inhabitants of the commune are known as Dadas in French.

Historical population
Year	Pop.	±% p.a.
1968	416	—
1975	397	−0.67%
1982	407	+0.36%
1990	359	−1.56%
1999	350	−0.28%
2007	335	−0.55%
2012	401	+3.66%
2017	392	−0.45%
2023	382	−0.43%
Source: INSEE

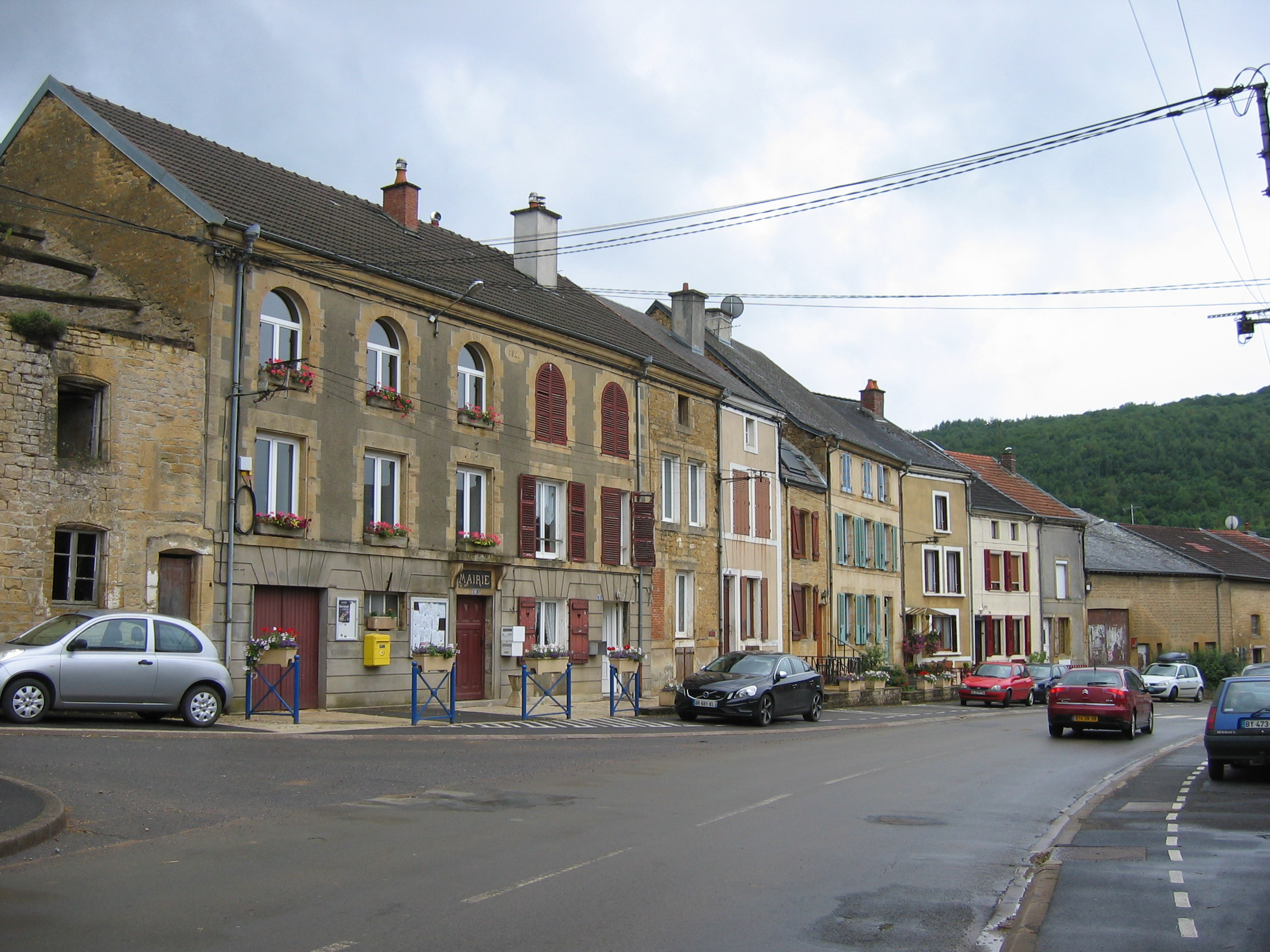
The Town Hall

== Culture and heritage ==
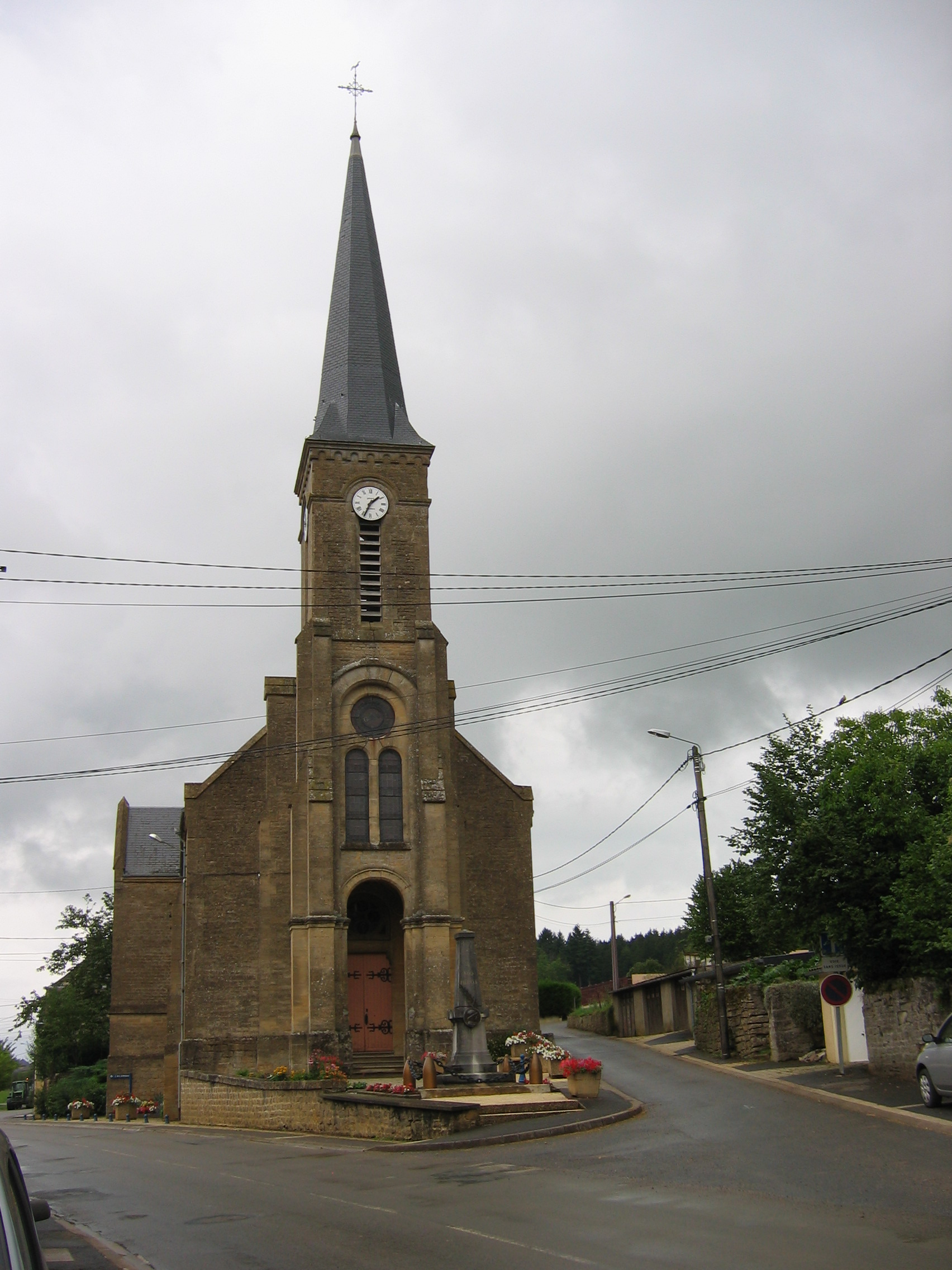
The Church of Saint Médard

=== Civil heritage ===
A Spinning Mill at 15 Rue du Chateau (19th century) is registered as an historical monument.

=== Religious heritage ===
- The Church of Saint Médard contains a Funeral Plaque of Nicolas des Oudet (18th century) which is registered as an historical object.

== See also ==
- Communes of the Ardennes department
