= Autruche =

- Commune
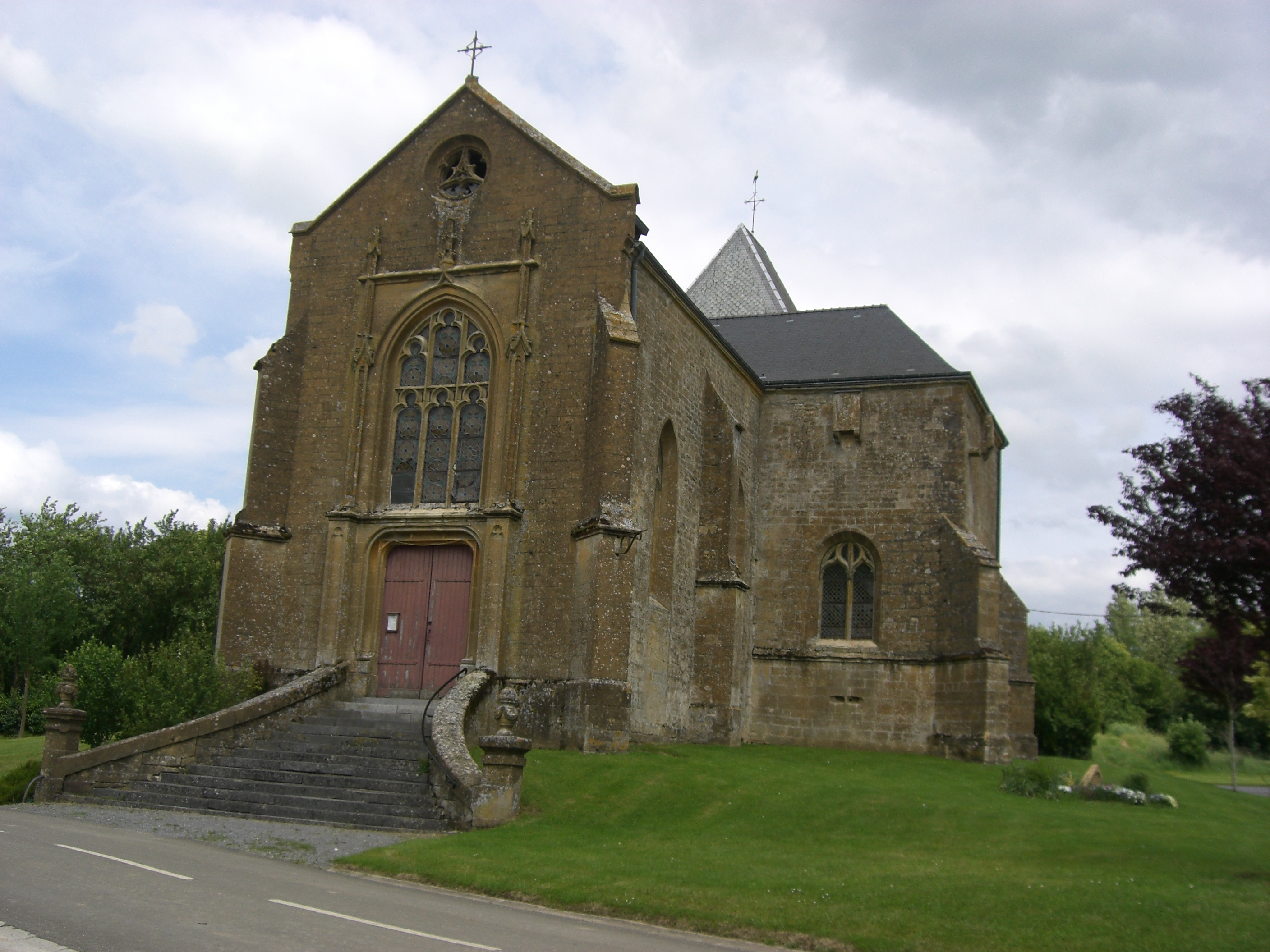
- The church in Autruche

- Coat of arms
- Location of Autruche
- Location within France Location within Grand Est
- Coordinates: 49°27′19″N 4°54′01″E
- Country: France
- Region: Grand Est
- Department: Ardennes
- Arrondissement: Vouziers
- Canton: Vouziers
- Intercommunality: CC Argonne Ardennaise

Government
  - Mayor (2020–2026): Anne Sembeni
- Area^{1}: 8.24 km^{2} (3.18 sq mi)
- Elevation: 186 m (610 ft)
- Highest elevation: 242 m (794 ft)
- Lowest elevation: 166 m (545 ft)
- Population (2023): 49
  - Density: 5.9/km^{2} (15/sq mi)
- Time zone: UTC+01:00 (CET)
  - Summer (DST): UTC+02:00 (CEST)
- INSEE/Postal code: 08035 /08240
- ^{1} French Land Register data, which excludes lakes, ponds, glaciers > 1 km^{2} (0.386 sq mi or 247 acres) and river estuaries.

Autruche (French pronunciation: [otʁyʃ]) is a commune in the Ardennes department in the Grand Est region of northern France.

== Geography ==
Autruche is located some 43 km east by south-east of Rethel and 20 km north-east of Vouziers. Access to the commune is by the D947 from Germont in the south-west which passes through the southern corner of the commune and continues east to Bar-lès-Buzancy. The D12 also comes from Authe in the north-west and joins the D947 in the commune. Access to the village is by a local road branching from the D947 which goes north to the village. The commune is entirely farmland except for some lakes in the south.

The Bar river forms the southern border of the commune as it flows west then follows the Canal des Ardennes to eventually join the Meuse at Vrigne-Meuse. The Ruisseau de Saint Pierremont flows from the north of the commune towards the south-west and continues to join the Bar west of the commune. The Ruisseau du Clageot rises in the north of the commune and flows south-west down the centre of the commune and also joins the Bar on the southern border.

=== Heraldry ===
| Arms of Autruche | The official status of the blazon remains to be determined. Blazon: Argent, a stalk of grass leaved and stalked in Vert with head of Sable between two pales of Gules, in chief Sable embattled of four and charged with three billets posed in fesse. |

== Administration ==
List of Successive Mayors

| From | To | Name |
|---|---|---|
| 1995 | 2014 | Claude Lambert |
| 2014 | current | Anne Sembeni |

== Demography ==
The inhabitants of the commune are known as Autruchiens or Autruchiennes in French.

Historical population

| Year | Pop. | ±% p.a. |
|---|---|---|
| 1793 | 225 | — |
| 1821 | 217 | −0.13% |
| 1846 | 254 | +0.63% |
| 1872 | 217 | −0.60% |
| 1901 | 197 | −0.33% |
| 1926 | 183 | −0.29% |
| 1946 | 119 | −2.13% |
| 1962 | 113 | −0.32% |
| 1968 | 101 | −1.85% |

| Year | Pop. | ±% p.a. |
|---|---|---|
| 1975 | 87 | −2.11% |
| 1982 | 71 | −2.86% |
| 1990 | 48 | −4.78% |
| 1999 | 44 | −0.96% |
| 2007 | 52 | +2.11% |
| 2012 | 61 | +3.24% |
| 2017 | 69 | +2.50% |
| 2023 | 49 | −5.55% |

Source: EHESS and INSEE

== Sites and monuments ==
The Church of Saint-Nicolas (16th century) is registered as an historical monument. The church contains two items that are registered as historical objects:

- 6 Statuettes (17th century)
- A Sculpture: Triumphant Virgin (17th century)

== See also ==
- Communes of the Ardennes department
