= Haraucourt =

Haraucourt may refer to the following communes in France:

- Haraucourt, Ardennes, in the Ardennes department
- Haraucourt, Meurthe-et-Moselle, in the Meurthe-et-Moselle department
- Haraucourt-sur-Seille, in the Moselle department
