= Toges =

Toges may refer to:

- Touge (Japanese: 峠, tôge)
- Toges, a commune of the Ardennes département, in France
