= Sauville =

Sauville may refer to the following places in France:

- Sauville, Ardennes, a commune in the Ardennes department
- Sauville, Vosges, a commune in the Vosges department
- Sauville, a fictional country in the light novel Gosick
