= Les Petites-Armoises =

- Commune
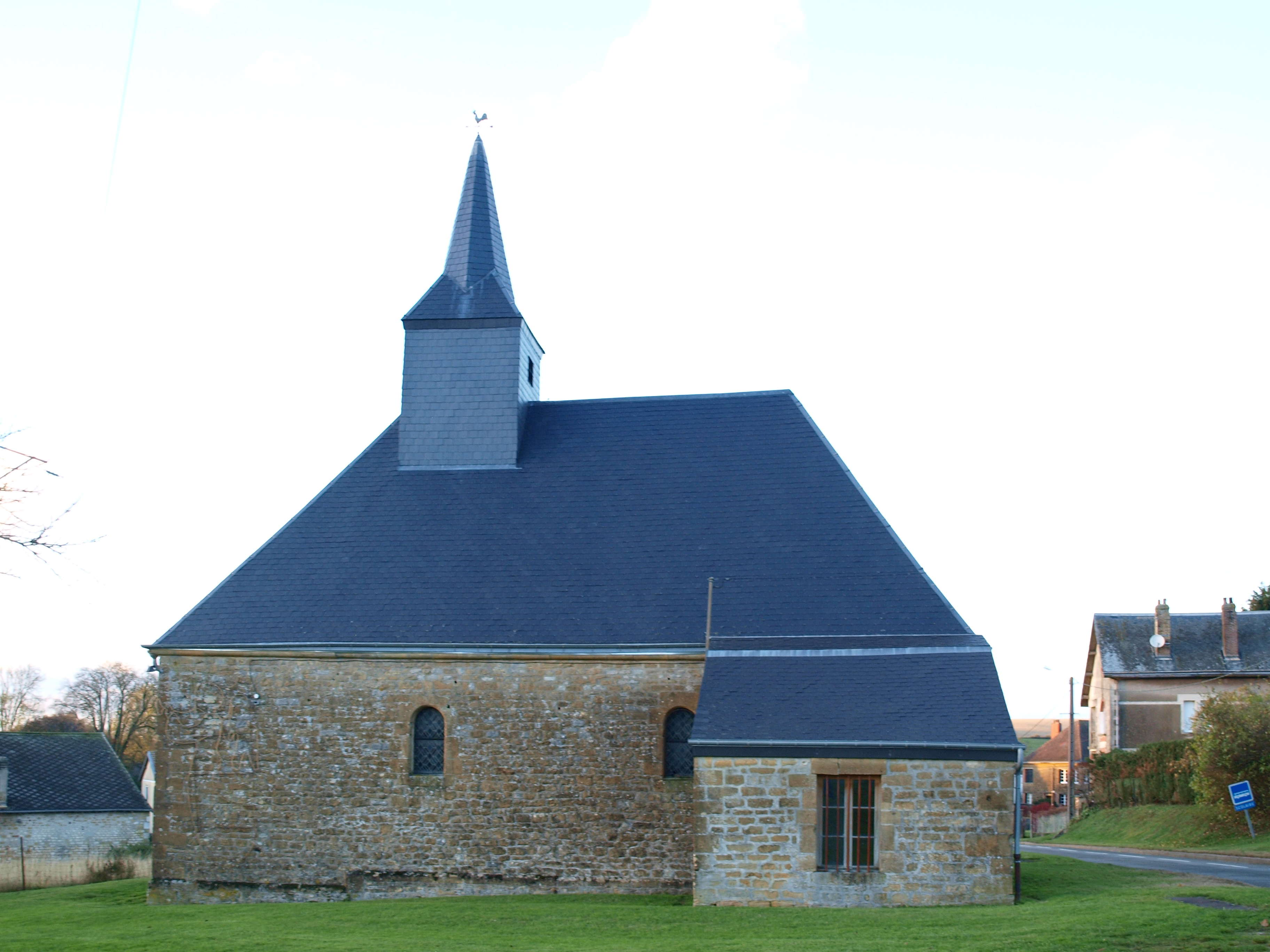
- The church in Les Petites-Armoises

- Coat of arms
- Location of Les Petites-Armoises
- Location within France Location within Grand Est
- Coordinates: 49°30′20″N 4°49′36″E
- Country: France
- Region: Grand Est
- Department: Ardennes
- Arrondissement: Vouziers
- Canton: Vouziers
- Intercommunality: Argonne Ardennaise

Government
  - Mayor (2020–2026): Jean-Claude Muller
- Area^{1}: 4.37 km^{2} (1.69 sq mi)
- Elevation: 170 m (560 ft)
- Highest elevation: 223 m (732 ft)
- Lowest elevation: 162 m (531 ft)
- Population (2023): 58
  - Density: 13/km^{2} (34/sq mi)
- Time zone: UTC+01:00 (CET)
  - Summer (DST): UTC+02:00 (CEST)
- INSEE/Postal code: 08020 /08390
- ^{1} French Land Register data, which excludes lakes, ponds, glaciers > 1 km^{2} (0.386 sq mi or 247 acres) and river estuaries.

Les Petites-Armoises (French pronunciation: [le pətit.z‿aʁmwaz]) is a commune in the Ardennes department in northern France.

== Population ==
Historical population
Year	Pop.	±% p.a.
1968	91	—
1975	80	−1.82%
1982	67	−2.50%
1990	66	−0.19%
1999	58	−1.43%
2007	63	+1.04%
2012	65	+0.63%
2017	63	−0.62%
2023	58	−1.37%
Source: INSEE

== See also ==
- Communes of the Ardennes department
