= La Neuville-à-Maire =

- Commune
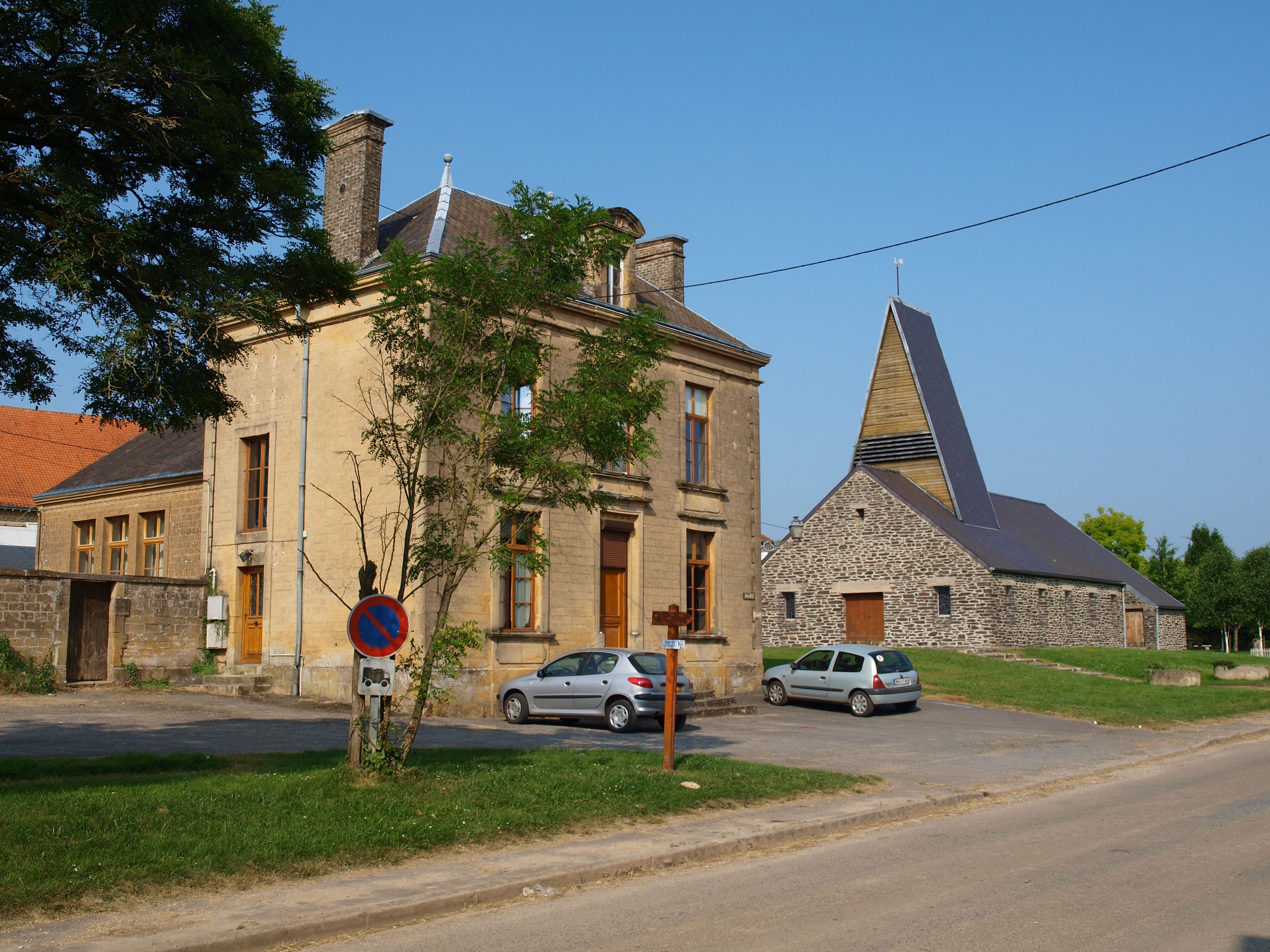
- The town hall and church in La Neuville-à-Maire

- Coat of arms
- Location of La Neuville-à-Maire
- Location within France Location within Grand Est
- Coordinates: 49°34′57″N 4°51′22″E
- Country: France
- Region: Grand Est
- Department: Ardennes
- Arrondissement: Sedan
- Canton: Vouziers

Government
  - Mayor (2020–2026): Vincent Bourgin
- Area^{1}: 7.26 km^{2} (2.80 sq mi)
- Elevation: 161 m (528 ft)
- Population (2023): 116
  - Density: 16.0/km^{2} (41.4/sq mi)
- Time zone: UTC+01:00 (CET)
  - Summer (DST): UTC+02:00 (CEST)
- INSEE/Postal code: 08317 /08450
- ^{1} French Land Register data, which excludes lakes, ponds, glaciers > 1 km^{2} (0.386 sq mi or 247 acres) and river estuaries.

La Neuville-à-Maire (French pronunciation: [la nøvil a mɛʁ]) is a commune in the Ardennes department in northern France.

== Population ==
Historical population
| Year | Pop. | ±% p.a. |
|---|---|---|
| 1968 | 97 | — |
| 1975 | 89 | −1.22% |
| 1982 | 79 | −1.69% |
| 1990 | 73 | −0.98% |
| 1999 | 75 | +0.30% |
| 2007 | 101 | +3.79% |
| 2012 | 121 | +3.68% |
| 2017 | 123 | +0.33% |
| 2023 | 116 | −0.97% |
Source: INSEE

== See also ==
- Communes of the Ardennes department
