= Boult-aux-Bois =

- Commune
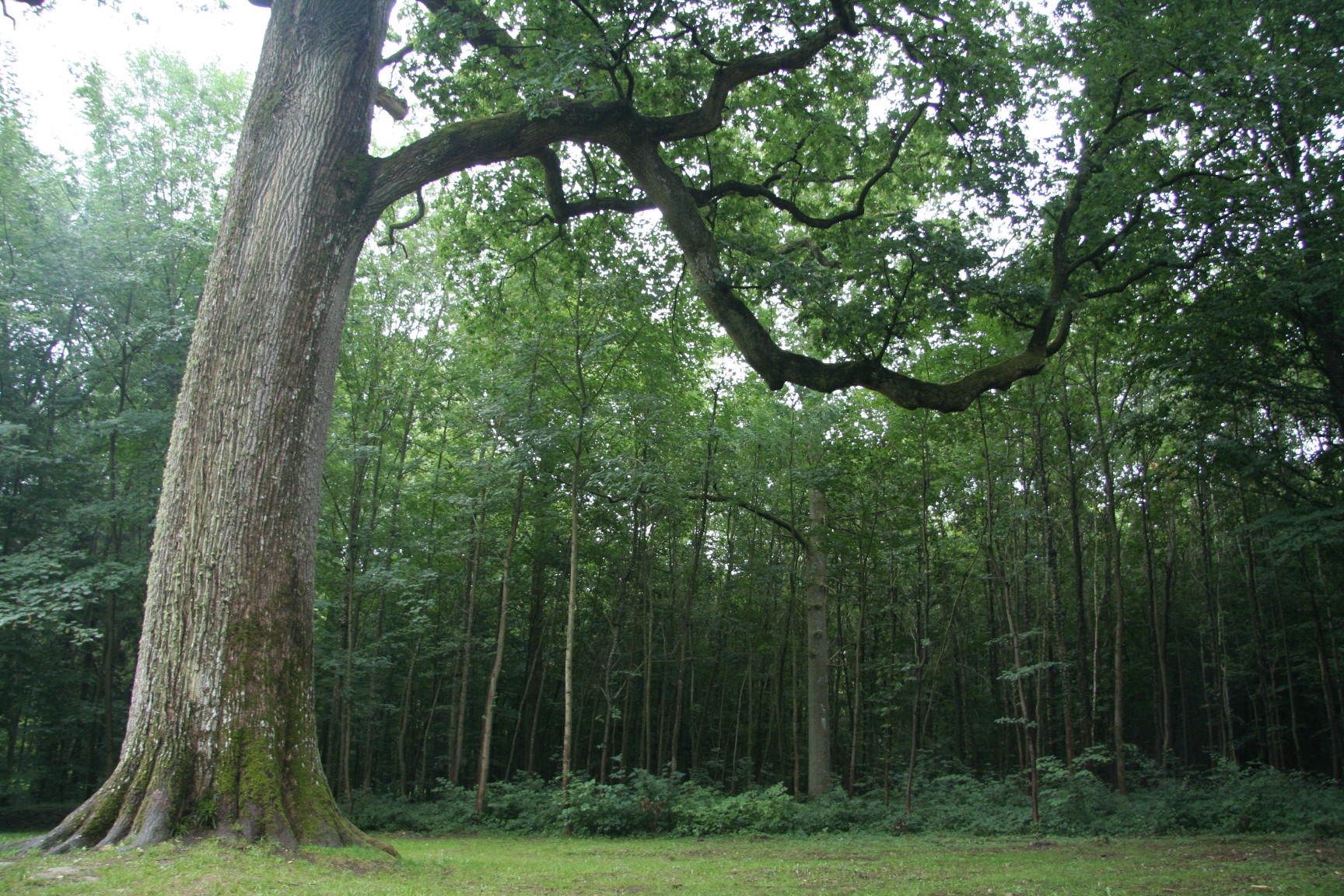
- Approximately 500-year-old oak

- Coat of arms
- Location of Boult-aux-Bois
- Location within France Location within Grand Est
- Coordinates: 49°25′55″N 4°50′35″E
- Country: France
- Region: Grand Est
- Department: Ardennes
- Arrondissement: Vouziers
- Canton: Vouziers
- Intercommunality: Argonne Ardennaise

Government
  - Mayor (2020–2026): Frédéric Mathias
- Area^{1}: 15.2 km^{2} (5.9 sq mi)
- Elevation: 180 m (590 ft)
- Highest elevation: 238 m (781 ft)
- Lowest elevation: 166 m (545 ft)
- Population (2023): 157
  - Density: 10.3/km^{2} (26.8/sq mi)
- Time zone: UTC+01:00 (CET)
  - Summer (DST): UTC+02:00 (CEST)
- INSEE/Postal code: 08075 /08240
- ^{1} French Land Register data, which excludes lakes, ponds, glaciers > 1 km^{2} (0.386 sq mi or 247 acres) and river estuaries.

Boult-aux-Bois (French pronunciation: [bult o bwa]) is a commune in the Ardennes department in northern France.

== Population ==
Historical population
Year	Pop.	±% p.a.
1968	158	—
1975	127	−3.07%
1982	143	+1.71%
1990	133	−0.90%
1999	148	+1.19%
2007	141	−0.60%
2012	143	+0.28%
2017	138	−0.71%
2023	157	+2.17%
Source: INSEE

== See also ==
- Communes of the Ardennes department
