= Sy, Ardennes =

Sy
- Commune
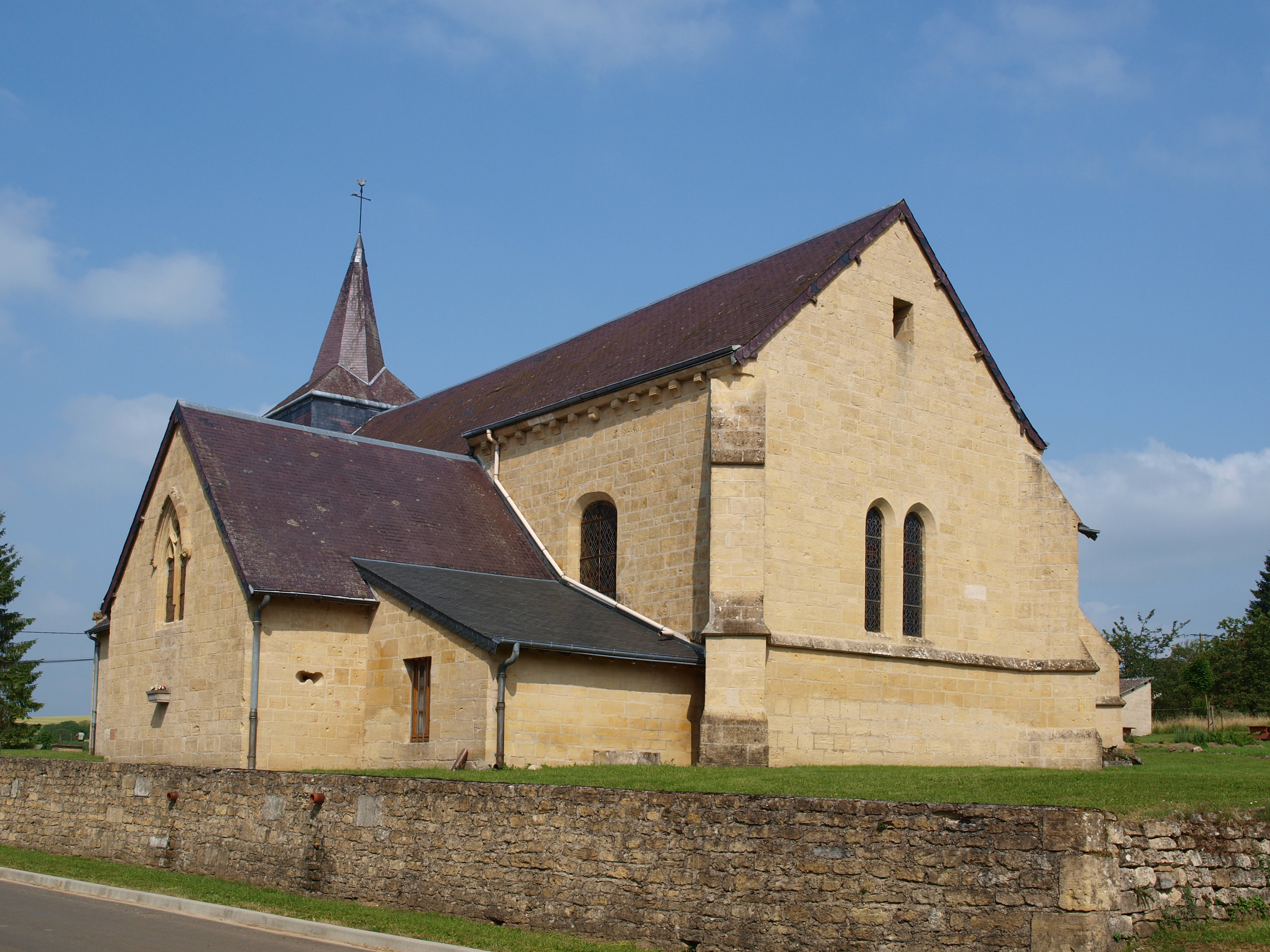
- The church in Sy

- Coat of arms
- Location of Sy
- Location within France Location within Grand Est
- Coordinates: 49°30′58″N 4°52′18″E
- Country: France
- Region: Grand Est
- Department: Ardennes
- Arrondissement: Rethel
- Canton: Vouziers
- Intercommunality: Argonne Ardennaise

Government
  - Mayor (2020–2026): Bruno Deswaene
- Area^{1}: 7.97 km^{2} (3.08 sq mi)
- Elevation: 180 m (590 ft)
- Highest elevation: 267 m (876 ft)
- Lowest elevation: 176 m (577 ft)
- Population (2023): 58
  - Density: 7.3/km^{2} (19/sq mi)
- Time zone: UTC+01:00 (CET)
  - Summer (DST): UTC+02:00 (CEST)
- INSEE/Postal code: 08434 /08390
- ^{1} French Land Register data, which excludes lakes, ponds, glaciers > 1 km^{2} (0.386 sq mi or 247 acres) and river estuaries.

Sy (French pronunciation: [si]) is a commune in the Ardennes department in northern France.

== Geography ==
The commune of Sy is located in the southern part of the Ardennes department, in the Grand Est region (Champagne-Ardennes sector). According to the Ardennes territorial divisions, it is situated in the arrondissement of Vouziers and lies within the Argonne Ardennaise Intercommunal Public Establishment (EPCI) to the north. It belongs to the canton of Vouziers. It is between 40 and 50 kilometers from Charleville-Mézières (further north) and about 30 kilometers from Sedan. A few kilometers east of Sy lies the commune of Bairon et ses environs (formed by the 2016 merger of Le Chesne, Louvergny and Les Alleux). But also, the commune is surrounded by Tannay, Les Grandes-Armoises, La Berlière, Oches, Verrières and Les Petites-Armoises. Crossed by the Ruisseau des Armoises, measuring 10.5 km.

== Hydrography ==
The municipality is located in the Meuse watershed within the Rhine-Meuse basin. It is drained by the Armoises stream, the Ecogne stream, and the Uchon stream.

== Population ==
Historical population
Year	Pop.	±% p.a.
1968	82	—
1975	56	−5.30%
1982	61	+1.23%
1990	50	−2.45%
1999	45	−1.16%
2007	41	−1.16%
2012	48	+3.20%
2017	51	+1.22%
2023	58	+2.17%
Source: INSEE

== See also ==
- List of short place names
- Communes of the Ardennes department
