= Les Grandes-Armoises =

- Commune
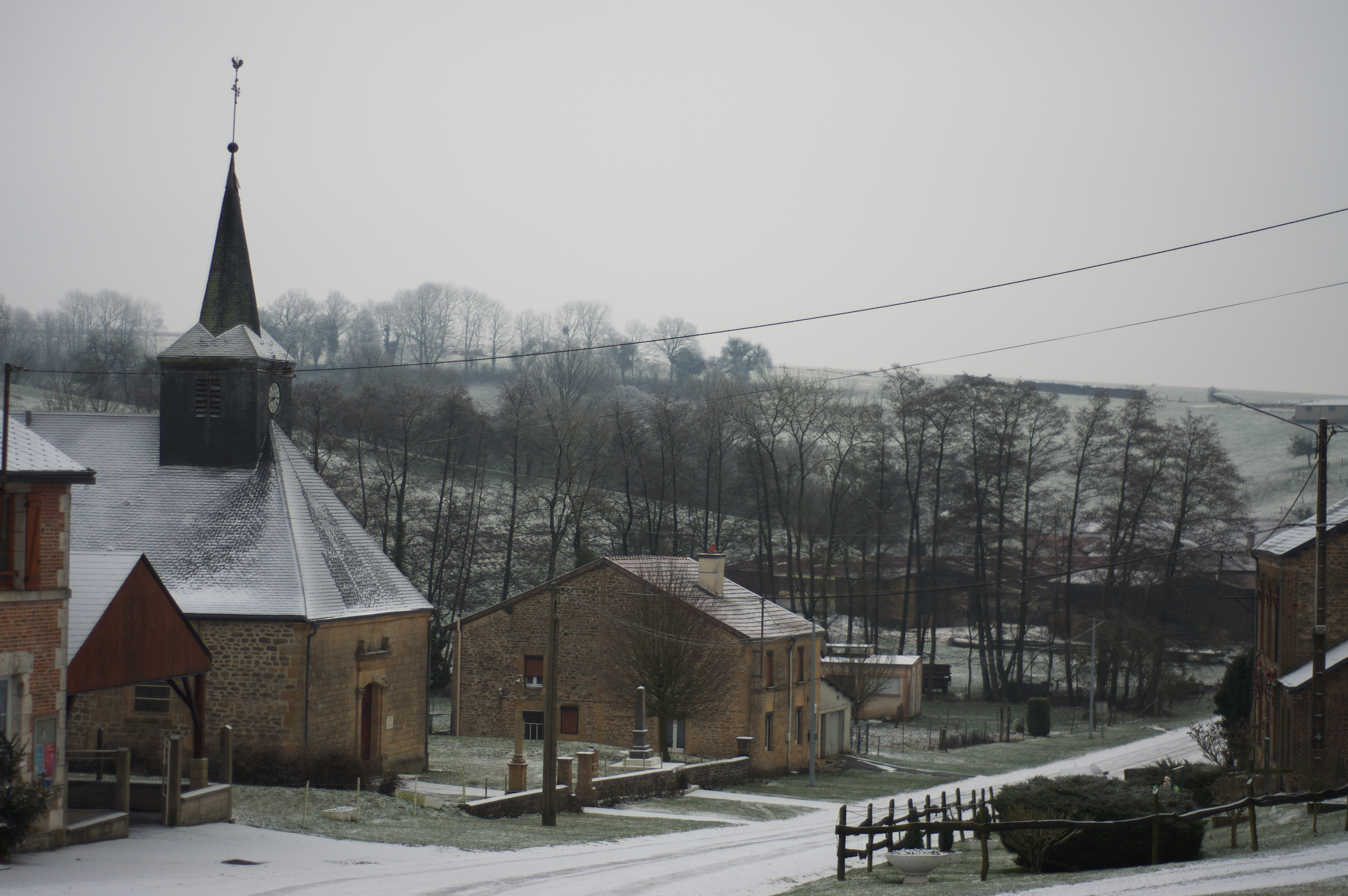
- The church and surroundings in Les Grandes-Armoises

- Coat of arms
- Location of Les Grandes-Armoises
- Location within France Location within Grand Est
- Coordinates: 49°31′53″N 4°53′38″E
- Country: France
- Region: Grand Est
- Department: Ardennes
- Arrondissement: Vouziers
- Canton: Vouziers
- Intercommunality: Argonne Ardennaise

Government
  - Mayor (2020–2026): Gérard Faillon
- Area^{1}: 4.47 km^{2} (1.73 sq mi)
- Elevation: 213 m (699 ft)
- Highest elevation: 300 m (980 ft)
- Lowest elevation: 192 m (630 ft)
- Population (2023): 53
  - Density: 12/km^{2} (31/sq mi)
- Time zone: UTC+01:00 (CET)
  - Summer (DST): UTC+02:00 (CEST)
- INSEE/Postal code: 08019 /08390
- ^{1} French Land Register data, which excludes lakes, ponds, glaciers > 1 km^{2} (0.386 sq mi or 247 acres) and river estuaries.

Les Grandes-Armoises (French pronunciation: [le ɡʁɑ̃d.z‿aʁmwaz]) is a commune in the Ardennes department and Grand Est region of north-eastern France.

== Population ==
Historical population
Year	Pop.	±% p.a.
1968	66	—
1975	63	−0.66%
1982	44	−5.00%
1990	54	+2.59%
1999	41	−3.01%
2007	46	+1.45%
2012	59	+5.10%
2017	61	+0.67%
2023	53	−2.32%
Source: INSEE

== See also ==
- Communes of the Ardennes department
