= La Croix-aux-Bois =

- Commune
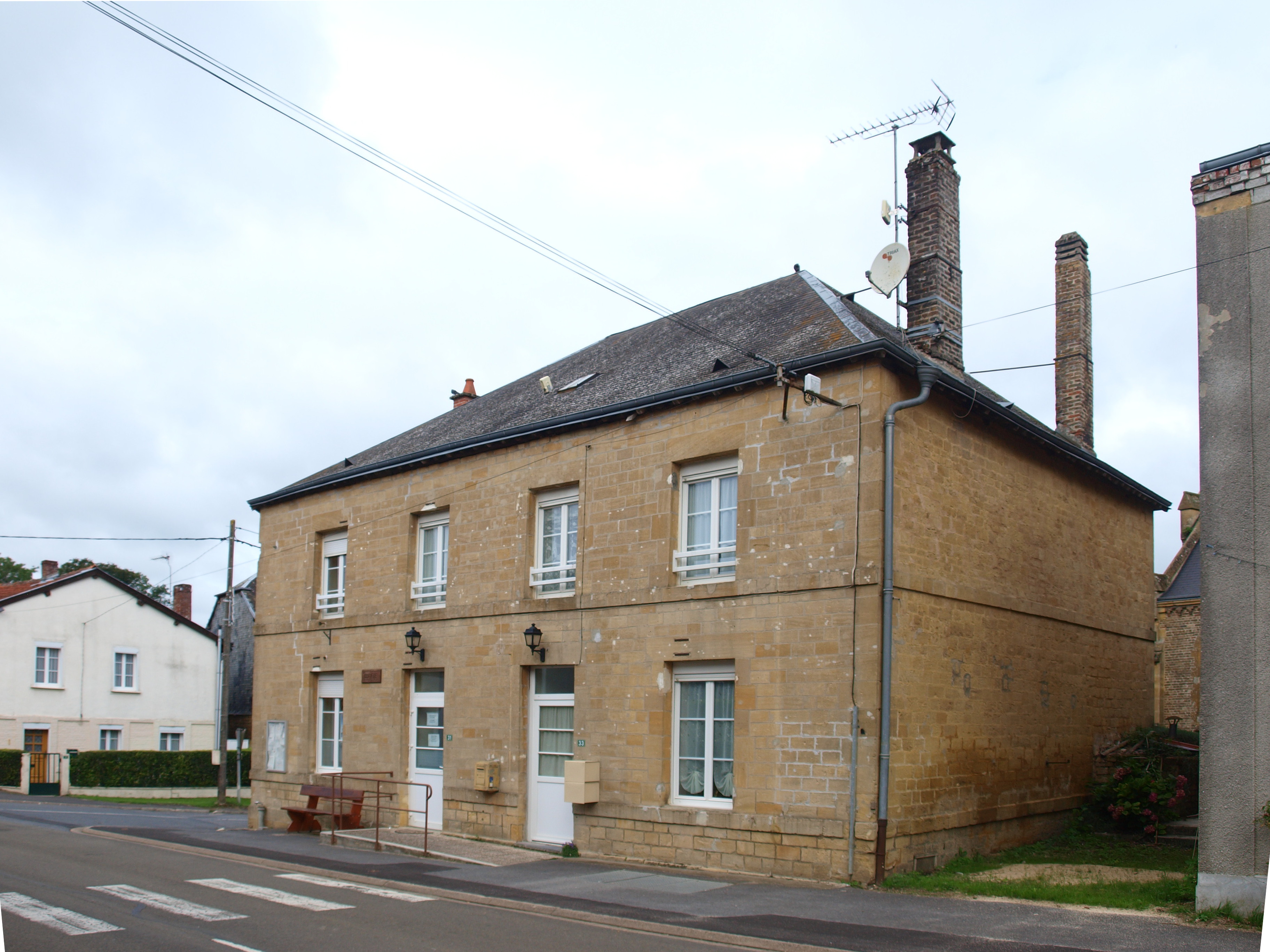
- The town hall in La Croix-aux-Bois
- Location of La Croix-aux-Bois
- Location within France Location within Grand Est
- Coordinates: 49°24′12″N 4°47′39″E
- Country: France
- Region: Grand Est
- Department: Ardennes
- Arrondissement: Vouziers
- Canton: Vouziers
- Intercommunality: Argonne Ardennaise

Government
  - Mayor (2020–2026): Daniel Bouillon
- Area^{1}: 5.77 km^{2} (2.23 sq mi)
- Elevation: 205 m (673 ft)
- Population (2023): 168
  - Density: 29.1/km^{2} (75.4/sq mi)
- Time zone: UTC+01:00 (CET)
  - Summer (DST): UTC+02:00 (CEST)
- INSEE/Postal code: 08135 /08400
- ^{1} French Land Register data, which excludes lakes, ponds, glaciers > 1 km^{2} (0.386 sq mi or 247 acres) and river estuaries.

La Croix-aux-Bois (French pronunciation: [la kʁwa o bwa]) is a commune in the Ardennes department in northern France.

== Population ==
Historical population
Year	Pop.	±% p.a.
1968	141	—
1975	150	+0.89%
1982	140	−0.98%
1990	159	+1.60%
1999	137	−1.64%
2007	118	−1.85%
2012	130	+1.96%
2017	149	+2.77%
2023	168	+2.02%
Source: INSEE

== See also ==
- Communes of the Ardennes department
