= Noirval =

- Commune
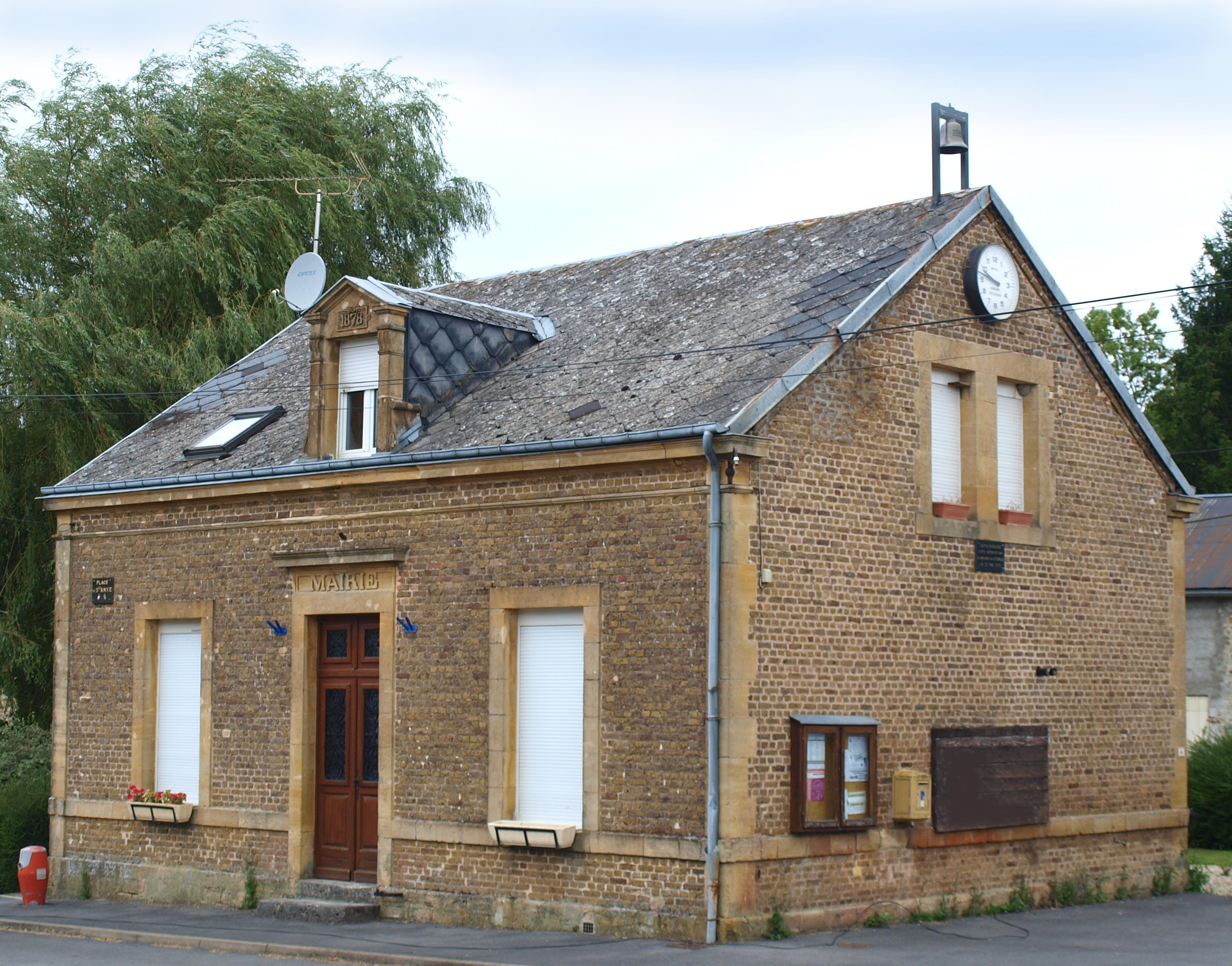
- The town hall in Noirval

- Coat of arms
- Location of Noirval
- Location within France Location within Grand Est
- Coordinates: 49°27′37″N 4°47′49″E
- Country: France
- Region: Grand Est
- Department: Ardennes
- Arrondissement: Vouziers
- Canton: Vouziers
- Intercommunality: Argonne Ardennaise

Government
  - Mayor (2020–2026): Thierry Baussart
- Area^{1}: 5 km^{2} (1.9 sq mi)
- Elevation: 158 m (518 ft)
- Highest elevation: 227 m (745 ft)
- Lowest elevation: 135 m (443 ft)
- Population (2023): 28
  - Density: 5.6/km^{2} (15/sq mi)
- Time zone: UTC+01:00 (CET)
  - Summer (DST): UTC+02:00 (CEST)
- INSEE/Postal code: 08325 /08400
- ^{1} French Land Register data, which excludes lakes, ponds, glaciers > 1 km^{2} (0.386 sq mi or 247 acres) and river estuaries.

Noirval (French pronunciation: [nwaʁval]) is a commune in the Ardennes department in northern France.

== Population ==
Historical population
Year	Pop.	±% p.a.
1968	75	—
1975	50	−5.63%
1982	42	−2.46%
1990	47	+1.42%
1999	27	−5.97%
2007	34	+2.92%
2012	32	−1.21%
2017	27	−3.34%
2023	28	+0.61%
Source: INSEE

== See also ==
- Communes of the Ardennes department
