= La Besace =

- Commune
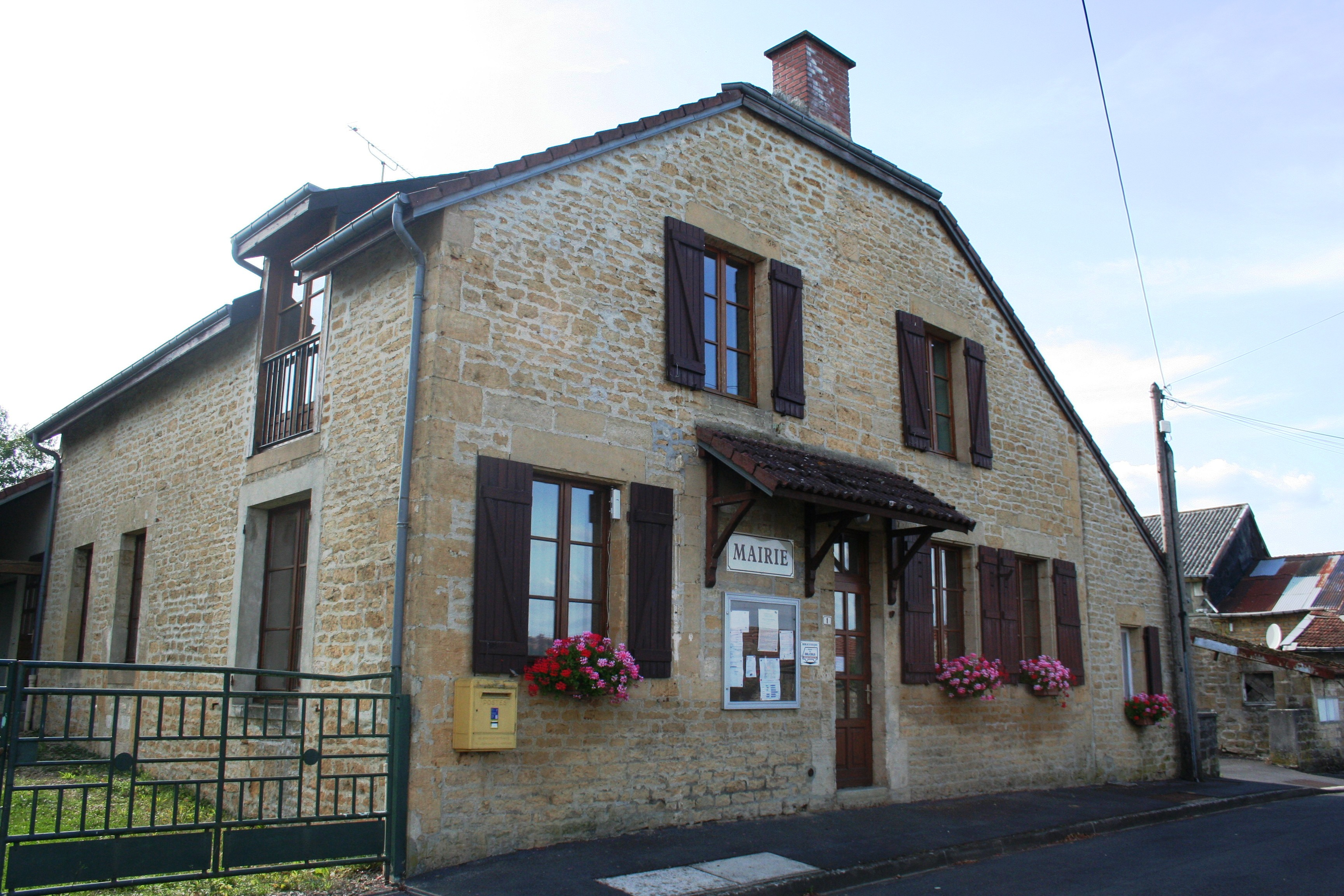
- The town hall in La Besace

- Coat of arms
- Location of La Besace
- Location within France Location within Grand Est
- Coordinates: 49°33′28″N 4°57′40″E
- Country: France
- Region: Grand Est
- Department: Ardennes
- Arrondissement: Sedan
- Canton: Vouziers
- Intercommunality: Portes du Luxembourg

Government
  - Mayor (2020–2026): Jean-Hugues Louis
- Area^{1}: 13.97 km^{2} (5.39 sq mi)
- Elevation: 244 m (801 ft)
- Highest elevation: 275 m (902 ft)
- Lowest elevation: 182 m (597 ft)
- Population (2023): 133
  - Density: 9.52/km^{2} (24.7/sq mi)
- Time zone: UTC+01:00 (CET)
  - Summer (DST): UTC+02:00 (CEST)
- INSEE/Postal code: 08063 /08450
- ^{1} French Land Register data, which excludes lakes, ponds, glaciers > 1 km^{2} (0.386 sq mi or 247 acres) and river estuaries.

La Besace (French pronunciation: [la bəzas]) is a commune in the Ardennes department in northern France.

== Population ==
Historical population
Year	Pop.	±% p.a.
1968	173	—
1975	165	−0.67%
1982	129	−3.46%
1990	132	+0.29%
1999	133	+0.08%
2007	128	−0.48%
2012	105	−3.88%
2017	141	+6.07%
2023	133	−0.97%
Source: INSEE

== See also ==
- Communes of the Ardennes department
