= Verrières, Ardennes =

Verrières
- Commune
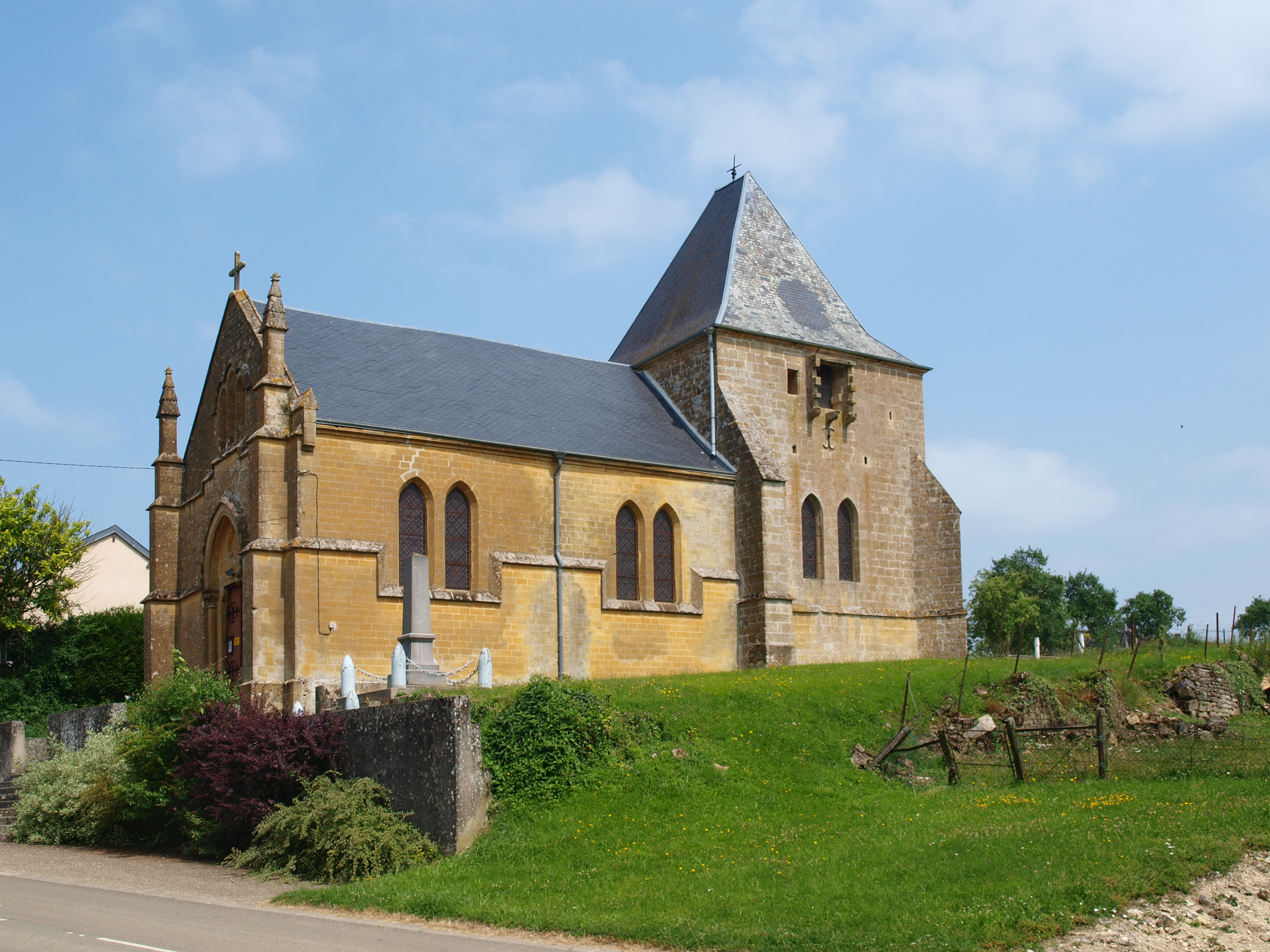
- The church in Verrières

- Coat of arms
- Location of Verrières
- Location within France Location within Grand Est
- Coordinates: 49°29′38″N 4°52′29″E
- Country: France
- Region: Grand Est
- Department: Ardennes
- Arrondissement: Vouziers
- Canton: Vouziers
- Intercommunality: Argonne Ardennaise

Government
  - Mayor (2020–2026): Martine Vernel
- Area^{1}: 6.36 km^{2} (2.46 sq mi)
- Elevation: 180 m (590 ft)
- Highest elevation: 247 m (810 ft)
- Lowest elevation: 170 m (560 ft)
- Population (2023): 33
  - Density: 5.2/km^{2} (13/sq mi)
- Time zone: UTC+01:00 (CET)
  - Summer (DST): UTC+02:00 (CEST)
- INSEE/Postal code: 08471 /08390
- ^{1} French Land Register data, which excludes lakes, ponds, glaciers > 1 km^{2} (0.386 sq mi or 247 acres) and river estuaries.

Verrières (French pronunciation: [vɛʁjɛʁ]) is a commune in the Ardennes department in northern France.

== Population ==
Historical population
Year	Pop.	±% p.a.
1968	60	—
1975	51	−2.29%
1982	40	−3.41%
1990	31	−3.14%
1999	31	+0.00%
2007	35	+1.53%
2012	28	−4.36%
2017	27	−0.72%
2023	33	+3.40%
Source: INSEE

== See also ==
- Communes of the Ardennes department
