= Bulson =

- Commune
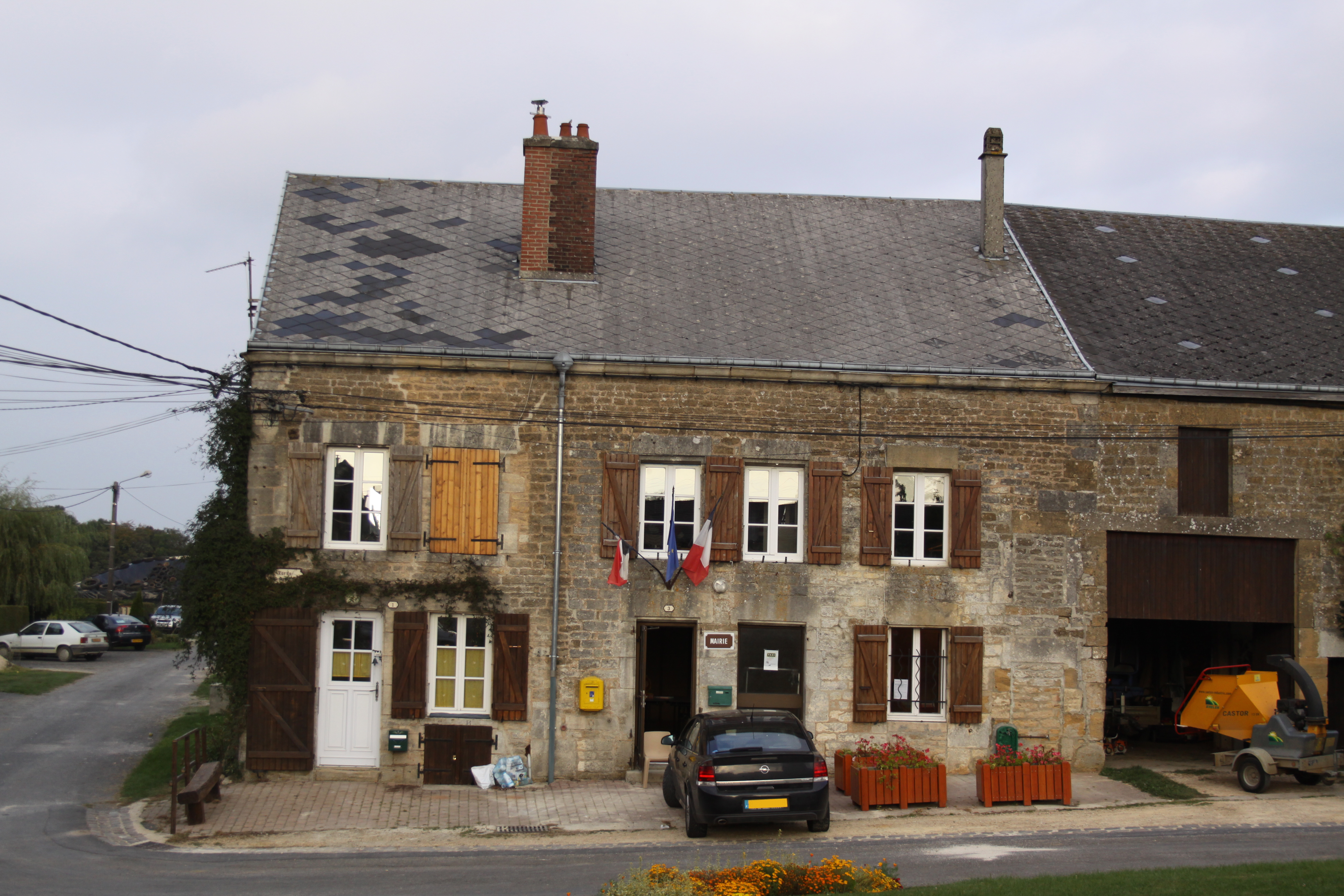
- The town hall in Bulson

- Coat of arms
- Location of Bulson
- Location within France Location within Grand Est
- Coordinates: 49°37′42″N 4°55′00″E
- Country: France
- Region: Grand Est
- Department: Ardennes
- Arrondissement: Sedan
- Canton: Vouziers

Government
  - Mayor (2020–2026): Patrick Berteaux
- Area^{1}: 6.47 km^{2} (2.50 sq mi)
- Elevation: 280 m (920 ft)
- Highest elevation: 322 m (1,056 ft)
- Lowest elevation: 184 m (604 ft)
- Population (2023): 140
  - Density: 22/km^{2} (56/sq mi)
- Time zone: UTC+01:00 (CET)
  - Summer (DST): UTC+02:00 (CEST)
- INSEE/Postal code: 08088 /08450
- ^{1} French Land Register data, which excludes lakes, ponds, glaciers > 1 km^{2} (0.386 sq mi or 247 acres) and river estuaries.

Bulson (French pronunciation: [bylsɔ̃]) is a commune in the Ardennes department in northern France.

== Population ==
Historical population
Year	Pop.	±% p.a.
1968	100	—
1975	94	−0.88%
1982	82	−1.93%
1990	108	+3.50%
1999	123	+1.46%
2007	134	+1.08%
2012	135	+0.15%
2017	134	−0.15%
2023	140	+0.73%
Source: INSEE

== See also ==
- Communes of the Ardennes department
