= Maisoncelle-et-Villers =

- Commune
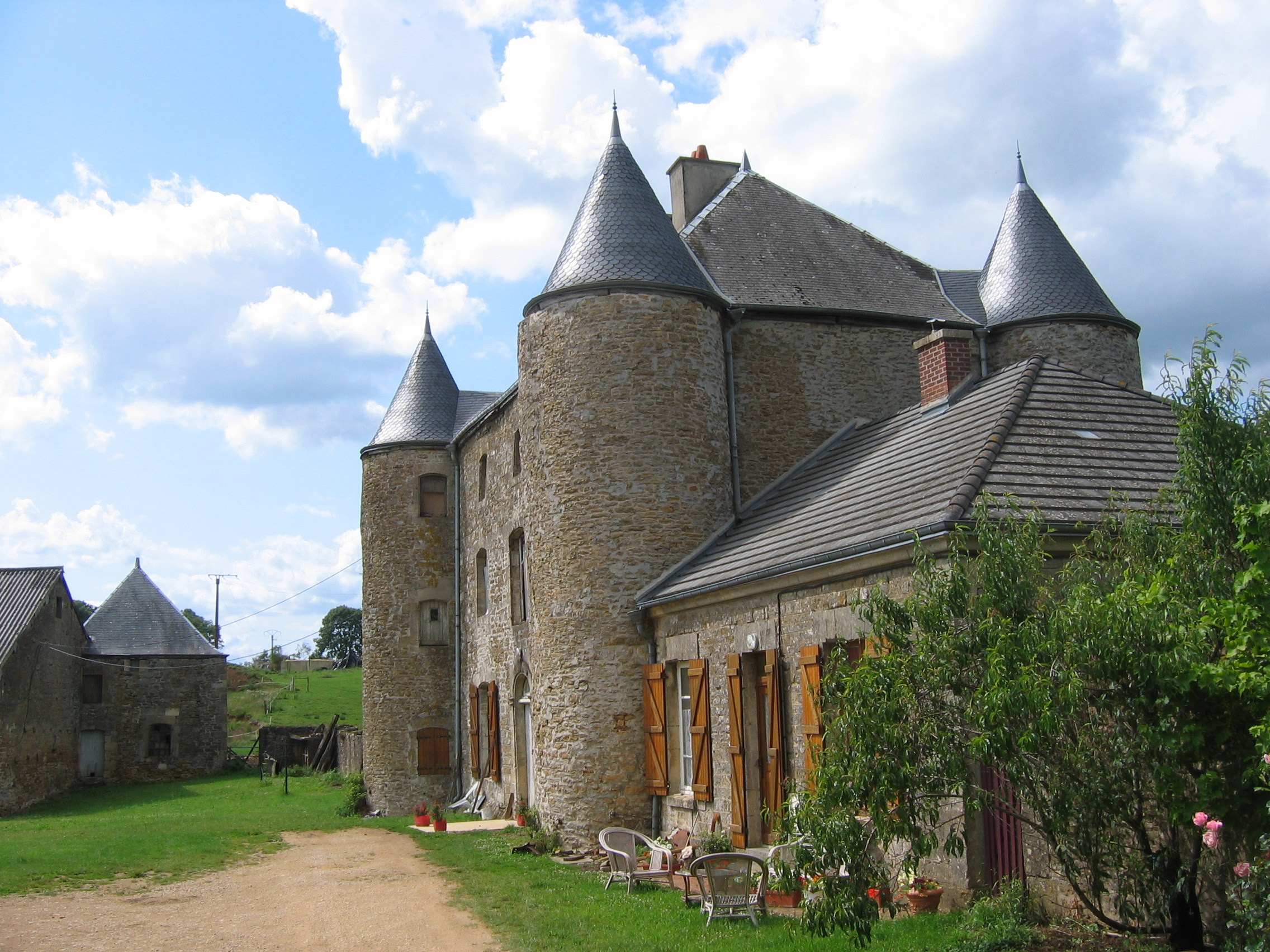
- Chateau of Villers

- Coat of arms
- Location of Maisoncelle-et-Villers
- Location within France Location within Grand Est
- Coordinates: 49°35′52″N 4°54′38″E
- Country: France
- Region: Grand Est
- Department: Ardennes
- Arrondissement: Sedan
- Canton: Vouziers

Government
  - Mayor (2020–2026): Francis Henriet
- Area^{1}: 11.08 km^{2} (4.28 sq mi)
- Elevation: 265 m (869 ft)
- Population (2023): 69
  - Density: 6.2/km^{2} (16/sq mi)
- Time zone: UTC+01:00 (CET)
  - Summer (DST): UTC+02:00 (CEST)
- INSEE/Postal code: 08268 /08450
- ^{1} French Land Register data, which excludes lakes, ponds, glaciers > 1 km^{2} (0.386 sq mi or 247 acres) and river estuaries.

Maisoncelle-et-Villers (French pronunciation: [mɛzɔ̃sɛl e vilɛʁ]) is a commune in the Ardennes department in northern France.

== Population ==
Historical population
Year	Pop.	±% p.a.
1968	93	—
1975	81	−1.95%
1982	59	−4.43%
1990	50	−2.05%
1999	67	+3.31%
2007	73	+1.08%
2012	72	−0.28%
2017	69	−0.85%
2023	69	+0.00%
Source: INSEE

== See also ==
- Communes of the Ardennes department
