= Montgon =

- Commune
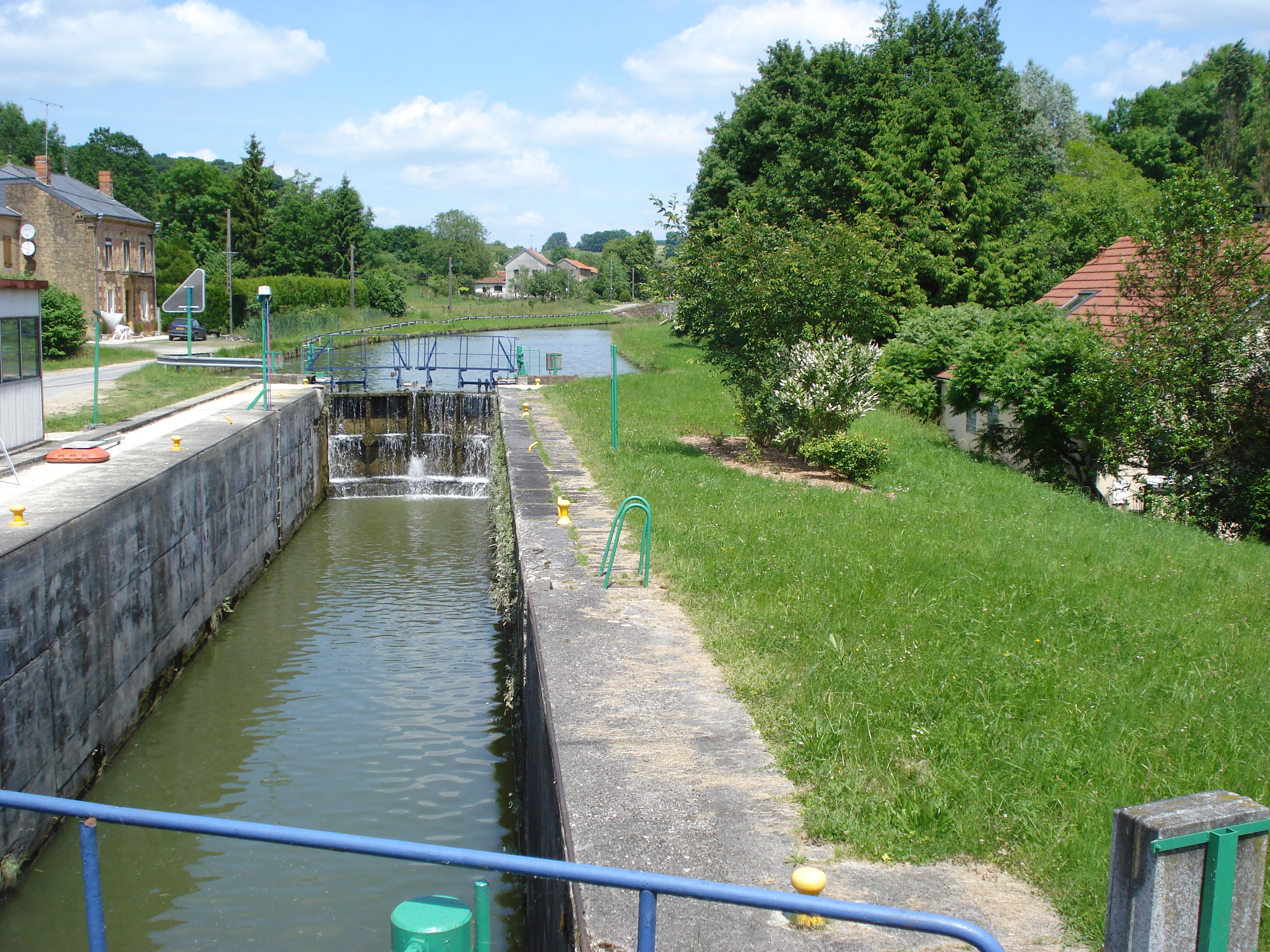
- Lock on the Canal des Ardennes

- Coat of arms
- Location of Montgon
- Location within France Location within Grand Est
- Coordinates: 49°30′20″N 4°42′54″E
- Country: France
- Region: Grand Est
- Department: Ardennes
- Arrondissement: Vouziers
- Canton: Vouziers
- Intercommunality: Argonne Ardennaise

Government
  - Mayor (2020–2026): Danielle Andrey
- Area^{1}: 8.2 km^{2} (3.2 sq mi)
- Elevation: 170 m (560 ft)
- Highest elevation: 210 m (690 ft)
- Lowest elevation: 112 m (367 ft)
- Population (2023): 72
  - Density: 8.8/km^{2} (23/sq mi)
- Time zone: UTC+01:00 (CET)
  - Summer (DST): UTC+02:00 (CEST)
- INSEE/Postal code: 08301 /08390
- ^{1} French Land Register data, which excludes lakes, ponds, glaciers > 1 km^{2} (0.386 sq mi or 247 acres) and river estuaries.

Montgon (French pronunciation: [mɔ̃ɡɔ̃]) is a commune in the Ardennes department in northern France.

== Population ==
Historical population
Year	Pop.	±% p.a.
1968	176	—
1975	141	−3.12%
1982	116	−2.75%
1990	97	−2.21%
1999	97	+0.00%
2007	75	−3.16%
2012	66	−2.52%
2017	66	+0.00%
2023	72	+1.46%
Source: INSEE

== See also ==
- Communes of the Ardennes department
