= Verpel =

- Commune
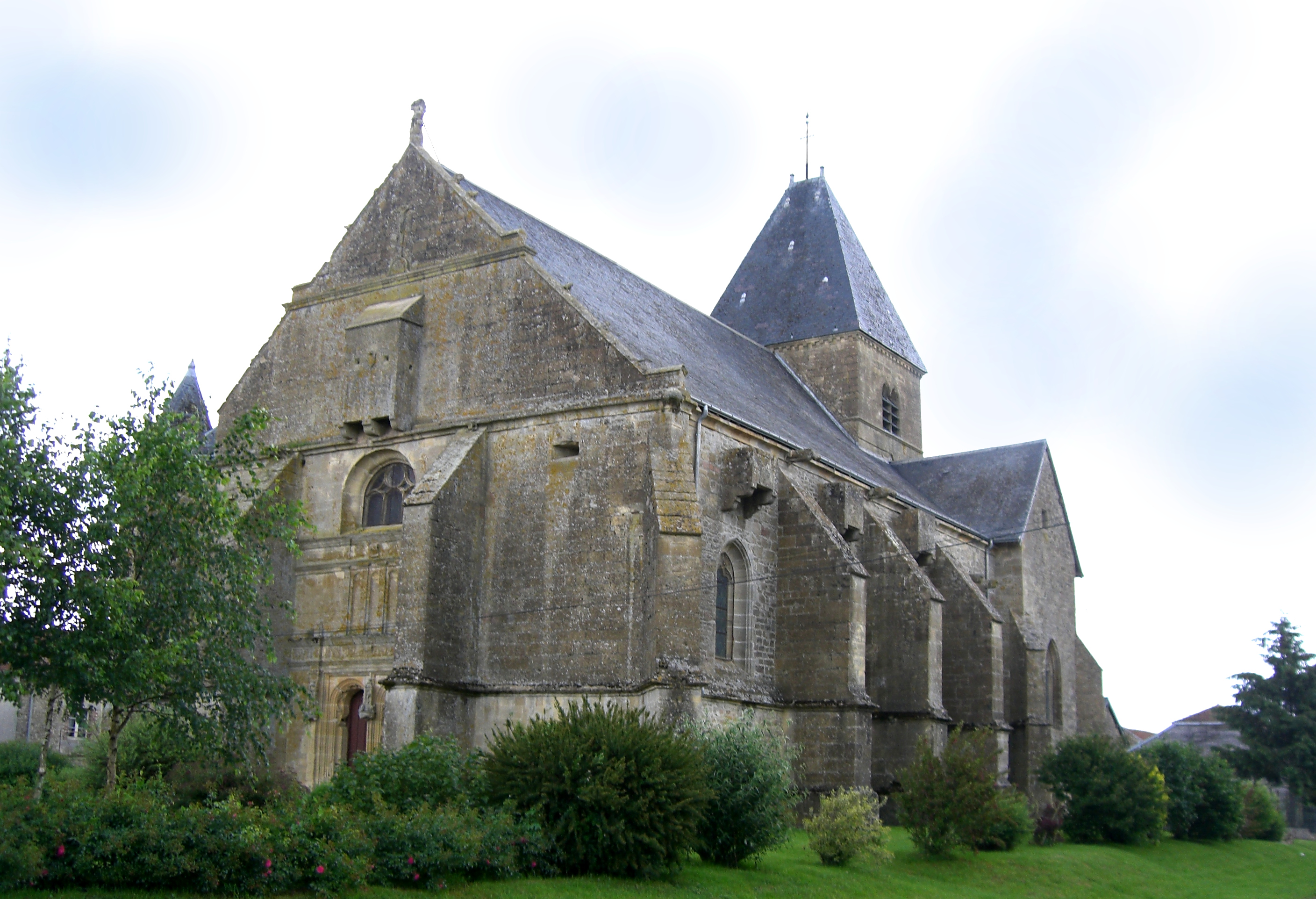
- The church in Verpel

- Coat of arms
- Location of Verpel
- Location within France Location within Grand Est
- Coordinates: 49°23′05″N 4°56′03″E
- Country: France
- Region: Grand Est
- Department: Ardennes
- Arrondissement: Vouziers
- Canton: Vouziers
- Intercommunality: Argonne Ardennaise

Government
  - Mayor (2020–2026): Bruno Maryns
- Area^{1}: 15.25 km^{2} (5.89 sq mi)
- Elevation: 163 m (535 ft)
- Highest elevation: 211 m (692 ft)
- Lowest elevation: 132 m (433 ft)
- Population (2023): 62
  - Density: 4.1/km^{2} (11/sq mi)
- Time zone: UTC+01:00 (CET)
  - Summer (DST): UTC+02:00 (CEST)
- INSEE/Postal code: 08470 /08240
- ^{1} French Land Register data, which excludes lakes, ponds, glaciers > 1 km^{2} (0.386 sq mi or 247 acres) and river estuaries.

Verpel (French pronunciation: [vɛʁpɛl]) is a commune in the Ardennes department in northern France.

== Population ==
Historical population
| Year | Pop. | ±% p.a. |
|---|---|---|
| 1968 | 137 | — |
| 1975 | 122 | −1.64% |
| 1982 | 102 | −2.53% |
| 1990 | 84 | −2.40% |
| 1999 | 88 | +0.52% |
| 2007 | 93 | +0.69% |
| 2012 | 81 | −2.73% |
| 2017 | 67 | −3.72% |
| 2023 | 62 | −1.28% |
Source: INSEE

== See also ==
- Communes of the Ardennes department
