= Vaux-en-Dieulet =

- Commune
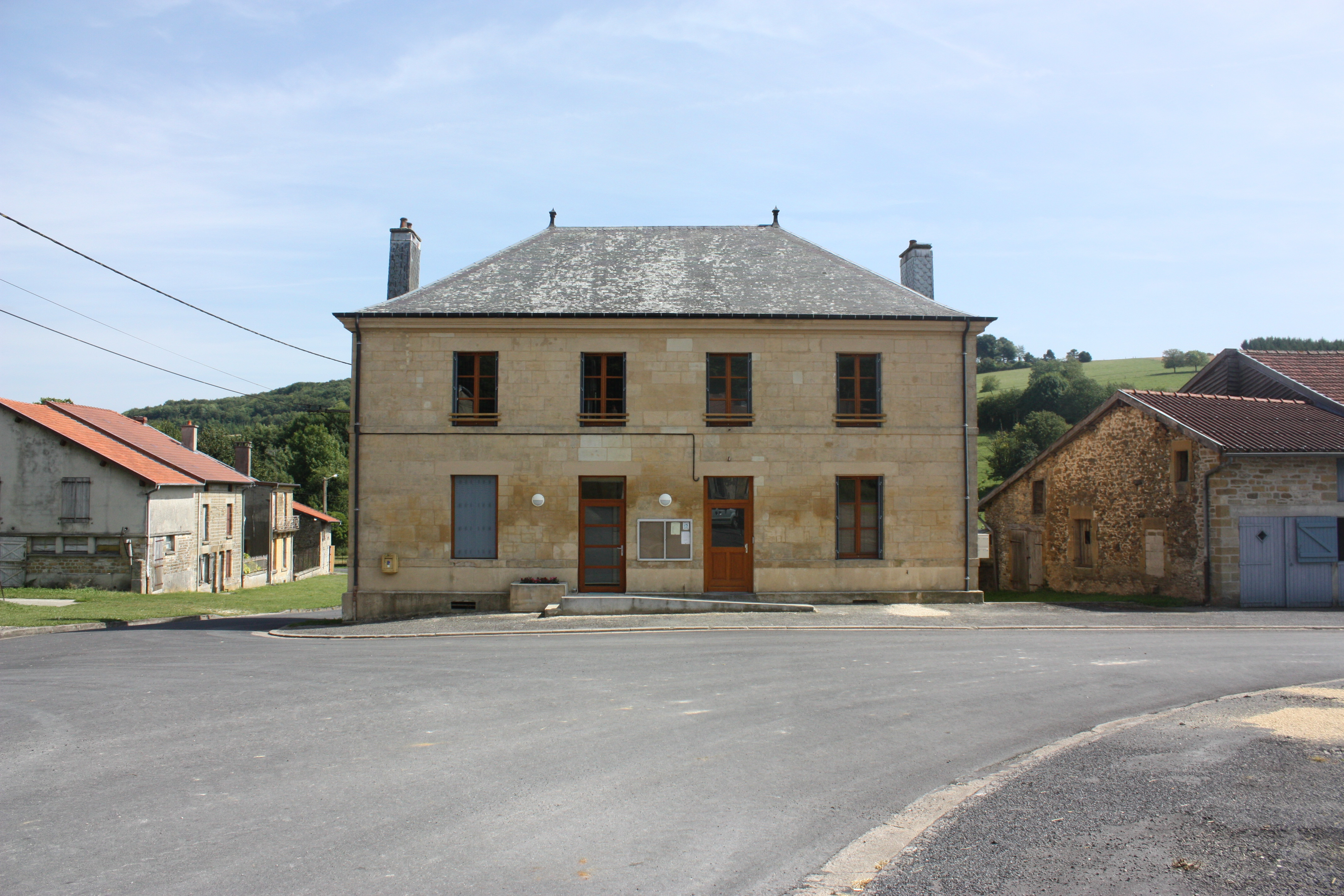
- Town hall
- Location of Vaux-en-Dieulet
- Location within France Location within Grand Est
- Coordinates: 49°29′01″N 4°59′36″E
- Country: France
- Region: Grand Est
- Department: Ardennes
- Arrondissement: Vouziers
- Canton: Vouziers
- Intercommunality: Argonne Ardennaise

Government
  - Mayor (2020–2026): Bernard Bestel
- Area^{1}: 11.03 km^{2} (4.26 sq mi)
- Elevation: 215 m (705 ft)
- Highest elevation: 329 m (1,079 ft)
- Lowest elevation: 177 m (581 ft)
- Population (2023): 53
  - Density: 4.8/km^{2} (12/sq mi)
- Time zone: UTC+01:00 (CET)
  - Summer (DST): UTC+02:00 (CEST)
- INSEE/Postal code: 08463 /08240
- ^{1} French Land Register data, which excludes lakes, ponds, glaciers > 1 km^{2} (0.386 sq mi or 247 acres) and river estuaries.

Vaux-en-Dieulet (French pronunciation: [vo ɑ̃ djœlɛ]) is a commune in the Ardennes department in northern France.

== Population ==
Historical population
| Year | Pop. | ±% p.a. |
|---|---|---|
| 1968 | 109 | — |
| 1975 | 96 | −1.80% |
| 1982 | 76 | −3.28% |
| 1990 | 68 | −1.38% |
| 1999 | 69 | +0.16% |
| 2007 | 70 | +0.18% |
| 2012 | 63 | −2.09% |
| 2017 | 54 | −3.04% |
| 2023 | 53 | −0.31% |
Source: INSEE

== See also ==
- Communes of the Ardennes department
