= Remilly-Aillicourt =

- Commune
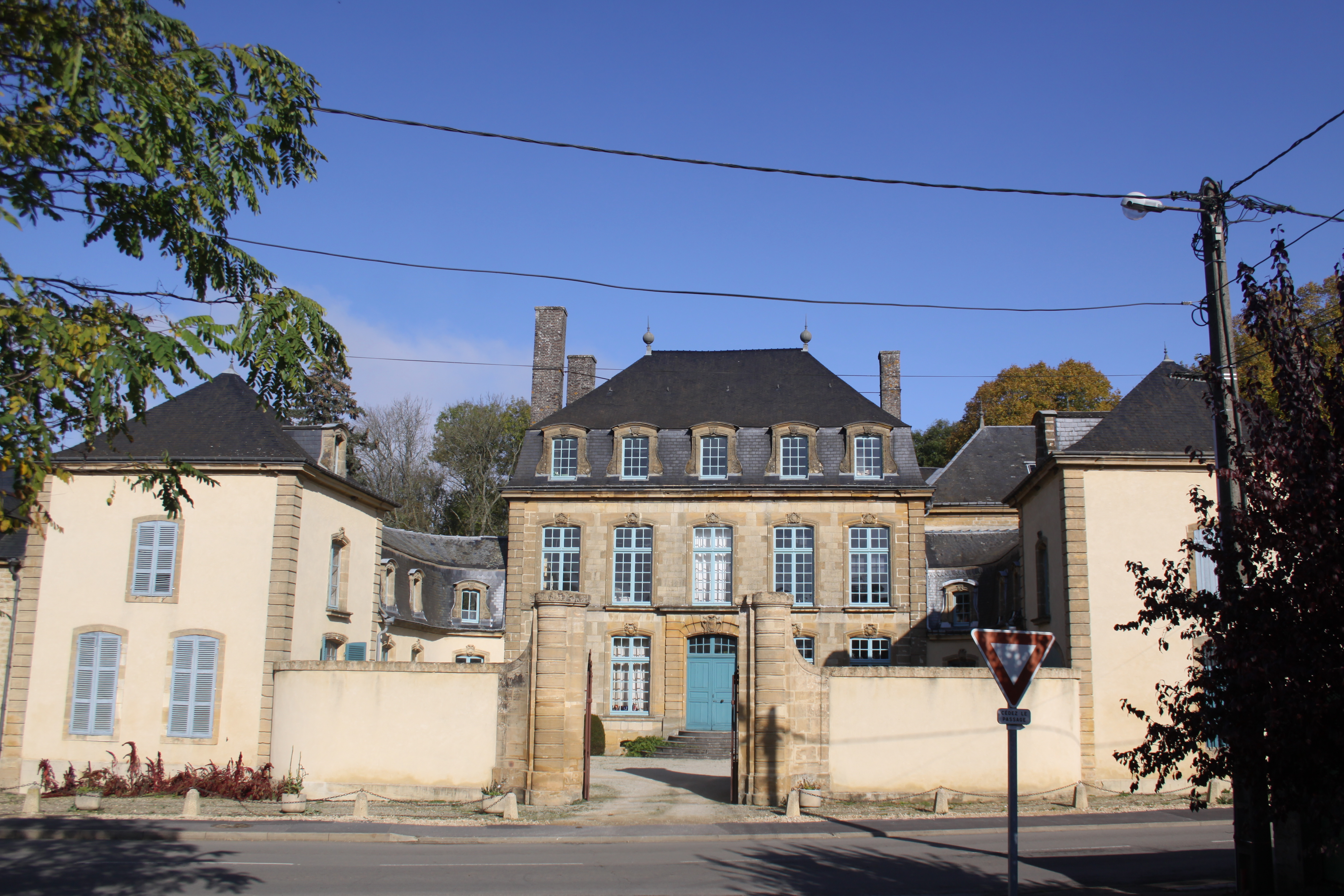
- Chateau

- Coat of arms
- Location of Remilly-Aillicourt
- Location within France Location within Grand Est
- Coordinates: 49°39′08″N 4°59′42″E
- Country: France
- Region: Grand Est
- Department: Ardennes
- Arrondissement: Sedan
- Canton: Vouziers

Government
  - Mayor (2020–2026): Marie-Antoinette Beauda
- Area^{1}: 13.26 km^{2} (5.12 sq mi)
- Elevation: 156 m (512 ft)
- Highest elevation: 302 m (991 ft)
- Lowest elevation: 153 m (502 ft)
- Population (2023): 754
  - Density: 56.9/km^{2} (147/sq mi)
- Time zone: UTC+01:00 (CET)
  - Summer (DST): UTC+02:00 (CEST)
- INSEE/Postal code: 08357 /08450
- ^{1} French Land Register data, which excludes lakes, ponds, glaciers > 1 km^{2} (0.386 sq mi or 247 acres) and river estuaries.

Remilly-Aillicourt (French pronunciation: [ʁəmiji ajikuʁ]) is a commune in the Ardennes department in northern France.

== Population ==
Historical population
Year	Pop.	±% p.a.
1968	903	—
1975	825	−1.28%
1982	819	−0.10%
1990	782	−0.58%
1999	781	−0.01%
2007	816	+0.55%
2012	794	−0.55%
2017	780	−0.36%
2023	754	−0.56%
Source: INSEE

== See also ==
- Communes of the Ardennes department
