= Landres-et-Saint-Georges =

- Commune
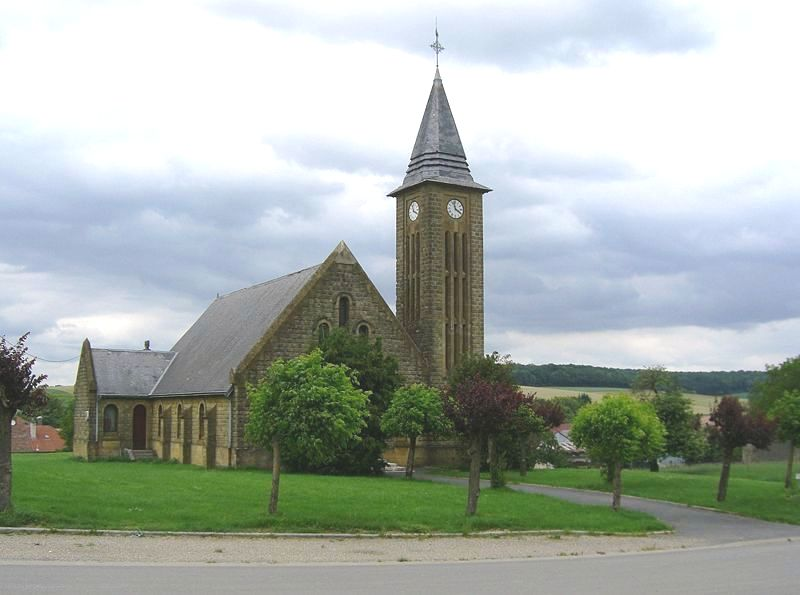
- The church in Landres
- Location of Landres-et-Saint-Georges
- Location within France Location within Grand Est
- Coordinates: 49°21′15″N 5°00′41″E
- Country: France
- Region: Grand Est
- Department: Ardennes
- Arrondissement: Vouziers
- Canton: Vouziers
- Intercommunality: Argonne Ardennaise

Government
  - Mayor (2020–2026): Jean-Pierre Corneille
- Area^{1}: 20.43 km^{2} (7.89 sq mi)
- Elevation: 200 m (660 ft)
- Highest elevation: 263 m (863 ft)
- Lowest elevation: 165 m (541 ft)
- Population (2023): 72
  - Density: 3.5/km^{2} (9.1/sq mi)
- Time zone: UTC+01:00 (CET)
  - Summer (DST): UTC+02:00 (CEST)
- INSEE/Postal code: 08246 /08240
- ^{1} French Land Register data, which excludes lakes, ponds, glaciers > 1 km^{2} (0.386 sq mi or 247 acres) and river estuaries.

Landres-et-Saint-Georges (French pronunciation: [lɑ̃dʁ e sɛ̃ ʒɔʁʒ]) is a commune in the Ardennes department in northern France.

== Population ==
Historical population
Year	Pop.	±% p.a.
1968	217	—
1975	180	−2.64%
1982	158	−1.85%
1990	128	−2.60%
1999	113	−1.38%
2007	101	−1.39%
2012	98	−0.60%
2017	79	−4.22%
2023	72	−1.53%
Source: INSEE

== See also ==
- Communes of the Ardennes department
