= Thénorgues =

- Commune
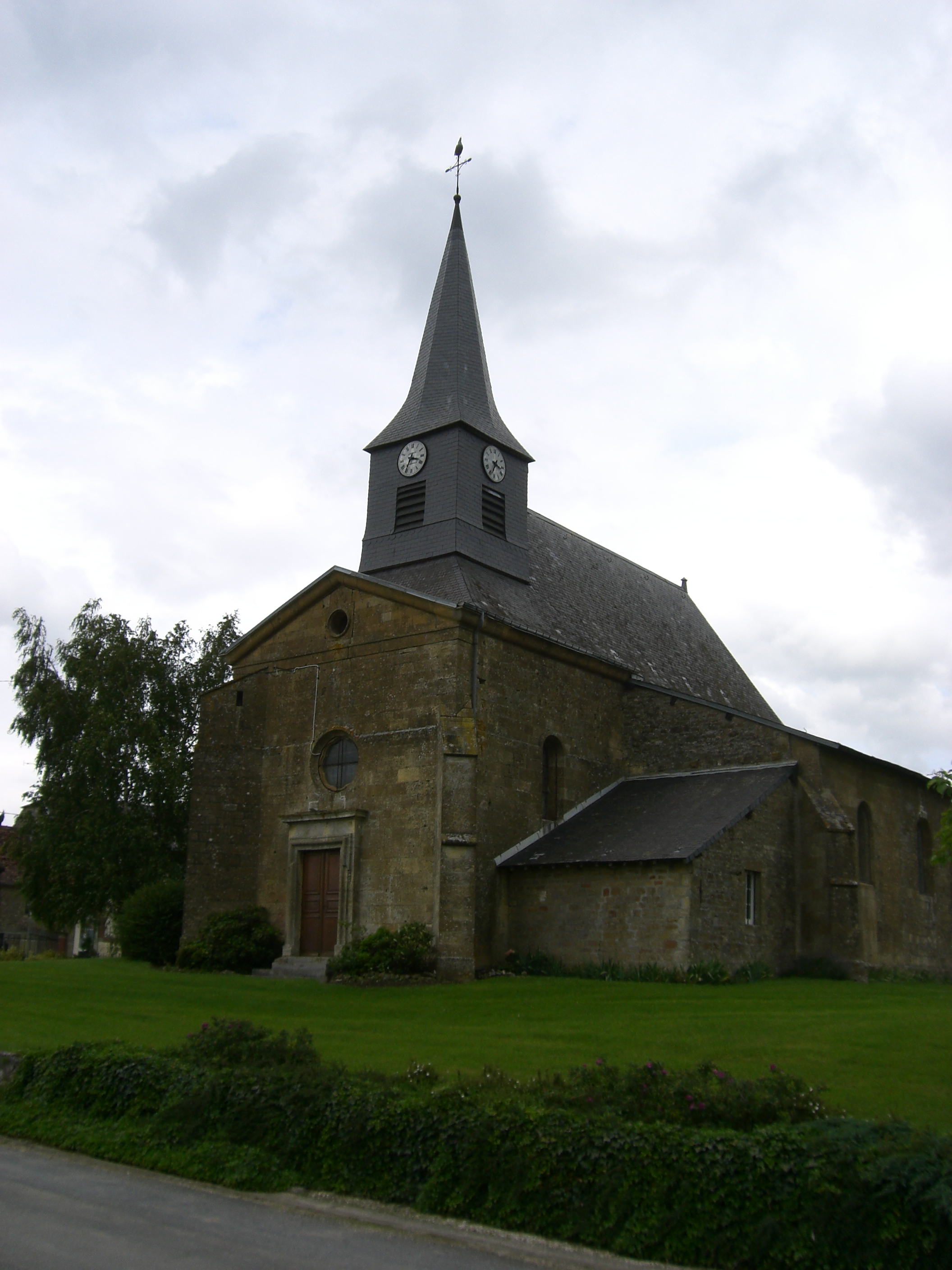
- The church in Thénorgues
- Location of Thénorgues
- Location within France Location within Grand Est
- Coordinates: 49°24′25″N 4°55′46″E
- Country: France
- Region: Grand Est
- Department: Ardennes
- Arrondissement: Vouziers
- Canton: Vouziers
- Intercommunality: Argonne Ardennaise

Government
  - Mayor (2020–2026): Christophe Dion
- Area^{1}: 9.25 km^{2} (3.57 sq mi)
- Elevation: 187 m (614 ft)
- Highest elevation: 227 m (745 ft)
- Lowest elevation: 154 m (505 ft)
- Population (2023): 85
  - Density: 9.2/km^{2} (24/sq mi)
- Time zone: UTC+01:00 (CET)
  - Summer (DST): UTC+02:00 (CEST)
- INSEE/Postal code: 08446 /08240
- ^{1} French Land Register data, which excludes lakes, ponds, glaciers > 1 km^{2} (0.386 sq mi or 247 acres) and river estuaries.

Thénorgues (French pronunciation: [tenɔʁɡ]) is a commune in the Ardennes department in northern France.

== Population ==
Historical population
Year	Pop.	±% p.a.
1968	112	—
1975	98	−1.89%
1982	82	−2.51%
1990	85	+0.45%
1999	85	+0.00%
2007	96	+1.53%
2012	107	+2.19%
2017	84	−4.72%
2023	85	+0.20%
Source: INSEE

== See also ==
- Communes of the Ardennes department
