= Sauville, Ardennes =

Sauville
- Commune
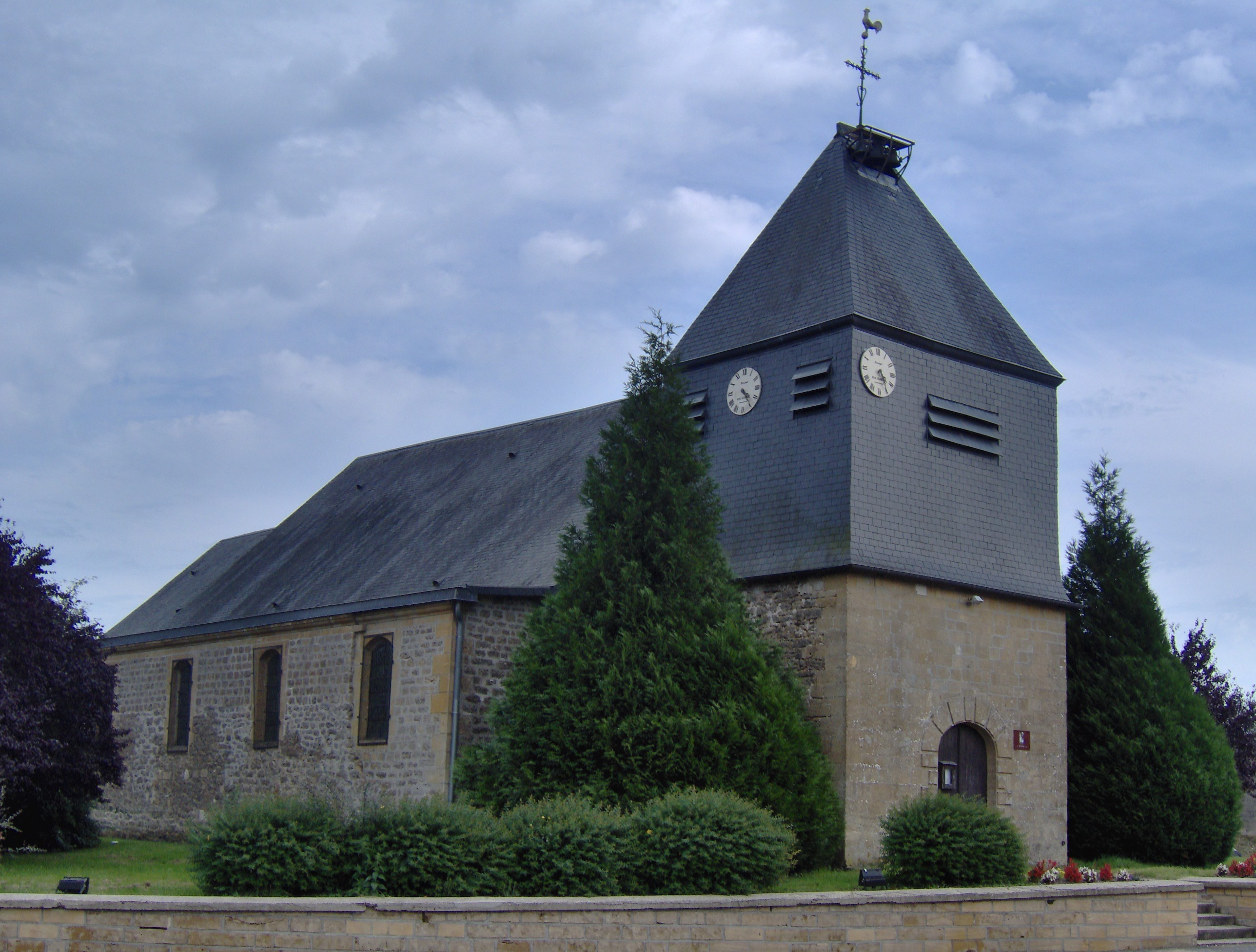
- The church in Sauville

- Coat of arms
- Location of Sauville
- Location within France Location within Grand Est
- Coordinates: 49°33′N 4°48′E
- Country: France
- Region: Grand Est
- Department: Ardennes
- Arrondissement: Vouziers
- Canton: Vouziers
- Intercommunality: Argonne Ardennaise

Government
  - Mayor (2021–2026): Nathalie Leloup
- Area^{1}: 14.76 km^{2} (5.70 sq mi)
- Highest elevation: 262 m (860 ft)
- Lowest elevation: 182 m (597 ft)
- Population (2023): 243
  - Density: 16.5/km^{2} (42.6/sq mi)
- Time zone: UTC+01:00 (CET)
  - Summer (DST): UTC+02:00 (CEST)
- INSEE/Postal code: 08405 /08390
- ^{1} French Land Register data, which excludes lakes, ponds, glaciers > 1 km^{2} (0.386 sq mi or 247 acres) and river estuaries.

Sauville (French pronunciation: [sovil]) is a commune in the Ardennes department in northern France.

== See also ==
- Communes of the Ardennes department
