= Canton of Vouziers =

Coordinates: 49.40°N 4.70°E

- Canton
- Situation of the canton of Vouziers in the department of Ardennes
- Country: France
- Region: Grand Est
- Department: Ardennes
- No. of communes: {{{nbcomm}}}
- Population (2023): 12,721
- INSEE code: 0819

The canton of Vouziers is an administrative division of the Ardennes department, northern France. Its borders were modified at the French canton reorganisation which came into effect in March 2015. Its seat is in Vouziers.

It consists of the following communes:

1. Angecourt
2. Artaise-le-Vivier
3. Authe
4. Autruche
5. Bairon-et-ses-Environs
6. Ballay
7. Bar-lès-Buzancy
8. Bayonville
9. Belleville-et-Châtillon-sur-Bar
10. Belval-Bois-des-Dames
11. La Berlière
12. La Besace
13. Boult-aux-Bois
14. Brieulles-sur-Bar
15. Briquenay
16. Bulson
17. Buzancy
18. Chémery-Chéhéry
19. La Croix-aux-Bois
20. Fossé
21. Germont
22. Les Grandes-Armoises
23. Haraucourt
24. Harricourt
25. Imécourt
26. Landres-et-Saint-Georges
27. Maisoncelle-et-Villers
28. Montgon
29. La Neuville-à-Maire
30. Noirval
31. Nouart
32. Oches
33. Les Petites-Armoises
34. Quatre-Champs
35. Raucourt-et-Flaba
36. Remilly-Aillicourt
37. Saint-Pierremont
38. Sauville
39. Sommauthe
40. Stonne
41. Sy
42. Tailly
43. Tannay-le-Mont-Dieu
44. Thénorgues
45. Toges
46. Vandy
47. Vaux-en-Dieulet
48. Verpel
49. Verrières
50. Vouziers
