= Belval-Bois-des-Dames =

- Commune
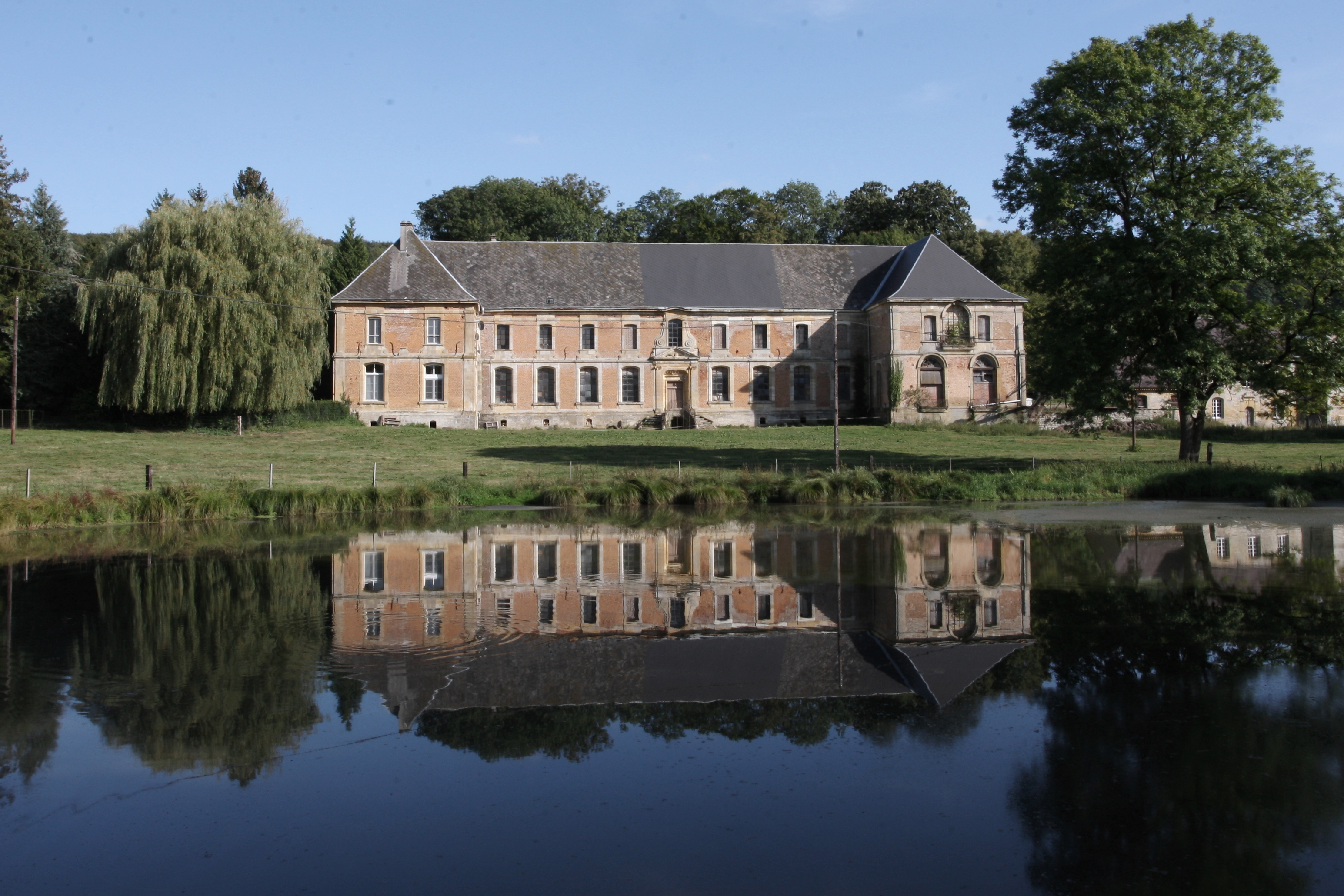
- Belval Abbey
- Location of Belval-Bois-des-Dames
- Location within France Location within Grand Est
- Coordinates: 49°28′11″N 5°02′13″E
- Country: France
- Region: Grand Est
- Department: Ardennes
- Arrondissement: Vouziers
- Canton: Vouziers
- Intercommunality: Argonne Ardennaise

Government
  - Mayor (2020–2026): Bruno Juillet
- Area^{1}: 17.22 km^{2} (6.65 sq mi)
- Elevation: 230 m (750 ft)
- Highest elevation: 317 m (1,040 ft)
- Lowest elevation: 168 m (551 ft)
- Population (2023): 26
  - Density: 1.5/km^{2} (3.9/sq mi)
- Time zone: UTC+01:00 (CET)
  - Summer (DST): UTC+02:00 (CEST)
- INSEE/Postal code: 08059 /08240
- ^{1} French Land Register data, which excludes lakes, ponds, glaciers > 1 km^{2} (0.386 sq mi or 247 acres) and river estuaries.

Belval-Bois-des-Dames is a commune in the Ardennes department and Grand Est region of north-eastern France.

== Population ==
Historical population
Year	Pop.	±% p.a.
1968	59	—
1975	59	+0.00%
1982	47	−3.20%
1990	39	−2.31%
1999	51	+3.03%
2007	41	−2.69%
2012	35	−3.11%
2017	33	−1.17%
2023	26	−3.90%
Source: INSEE

== See also ==
- Communes of the Ardennes department
