= Imécourt =

- Commune
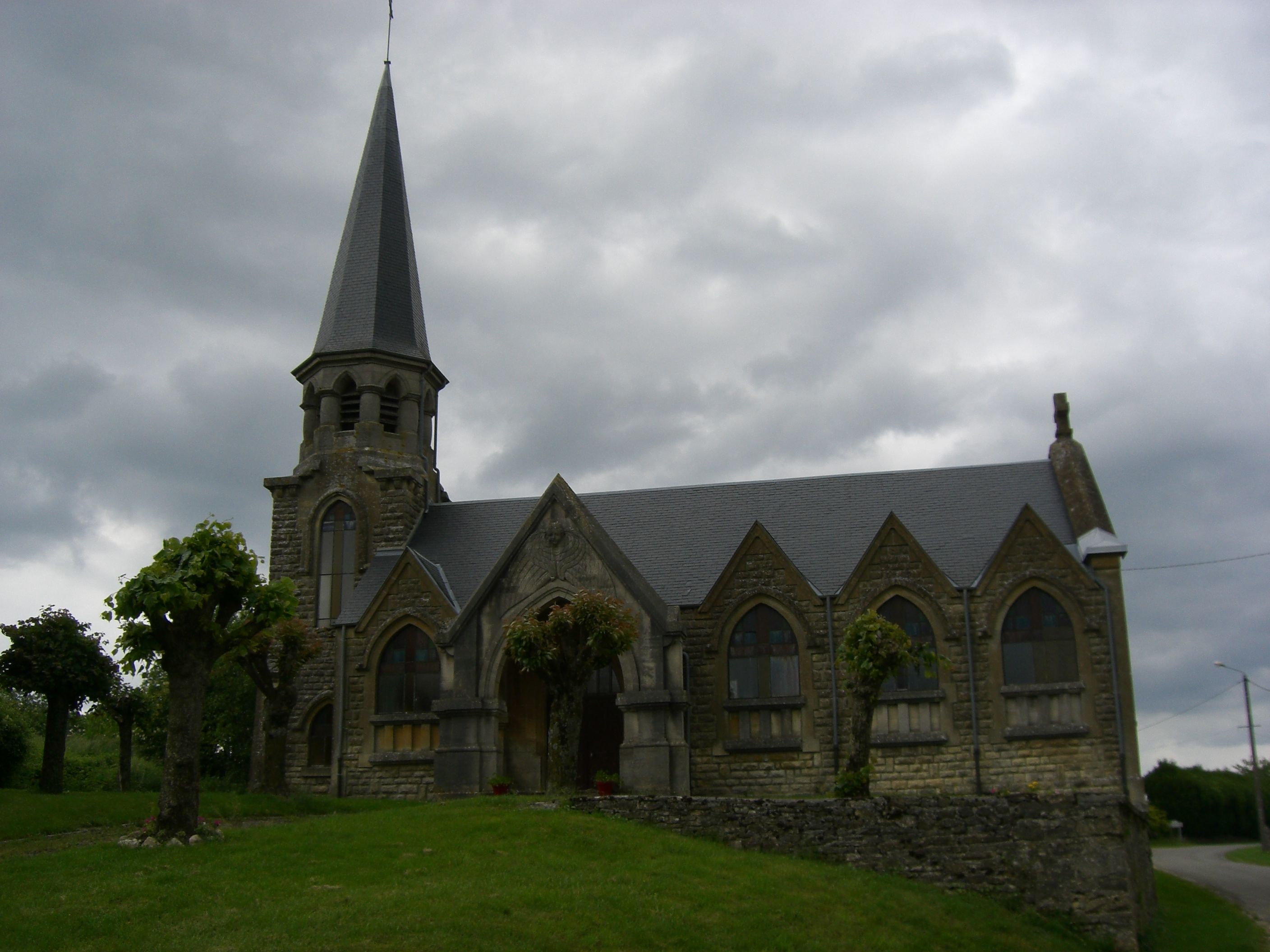
- The church in Imécourt

- Coat of arms
- Location of Imécourt
- Location within France Location within Grand Est
- Coordinates: 49°22′26″N 4°58′29″E
- Country: France
- Region: Grand Est
- Department: Ardennes
- Arrondissement: Vouziers
- Canton: Vouziers
- Intercommunality: Argonne Ardennaise

Government
  - Mayor (2020–2026): Christelle Herbay
- Area^{1}: 8.42 km^{2} (3.25 sq mi)
- Elevation: 330 m (1,080 ft)
- Highest elevation: 231 m (758 ft)
- Lowest elevation: 158 m (518 ft)
- Population (2023): 42
  - Density: 5.0/km^{2} (13/sq mi)
- Time zone: UTC+01:00 (CET)
  - Summer (DST): UTC+02:00 (CEST)
- INSEE/Postal code: 08233 /08240
- ^{1} French Land Register data, which excludes lakes, ponds, glaciers > 1 km^{2} (0.386 sq mi or 247 acres) and river estuaries.

Imécourt (French pronunciation: [imekuʁ]) is a commune in the Ardennes department in northern France.

== Population ==
Historical population
Year	Pop.	±% p.a.
1968	99	—
1975	86	−1.99%
1982	67	−3.50%
1990	69	+0.37%
1999	61	−1.36%
2007	62	+0.20%
2012	54	−2.73%
2017	49	−1.92%
2023	42	−2.54%
Source: INSEE

== See also ==
- Communes of the Ardennes department
