= Toges, Ardennes =

Toges
- Commune
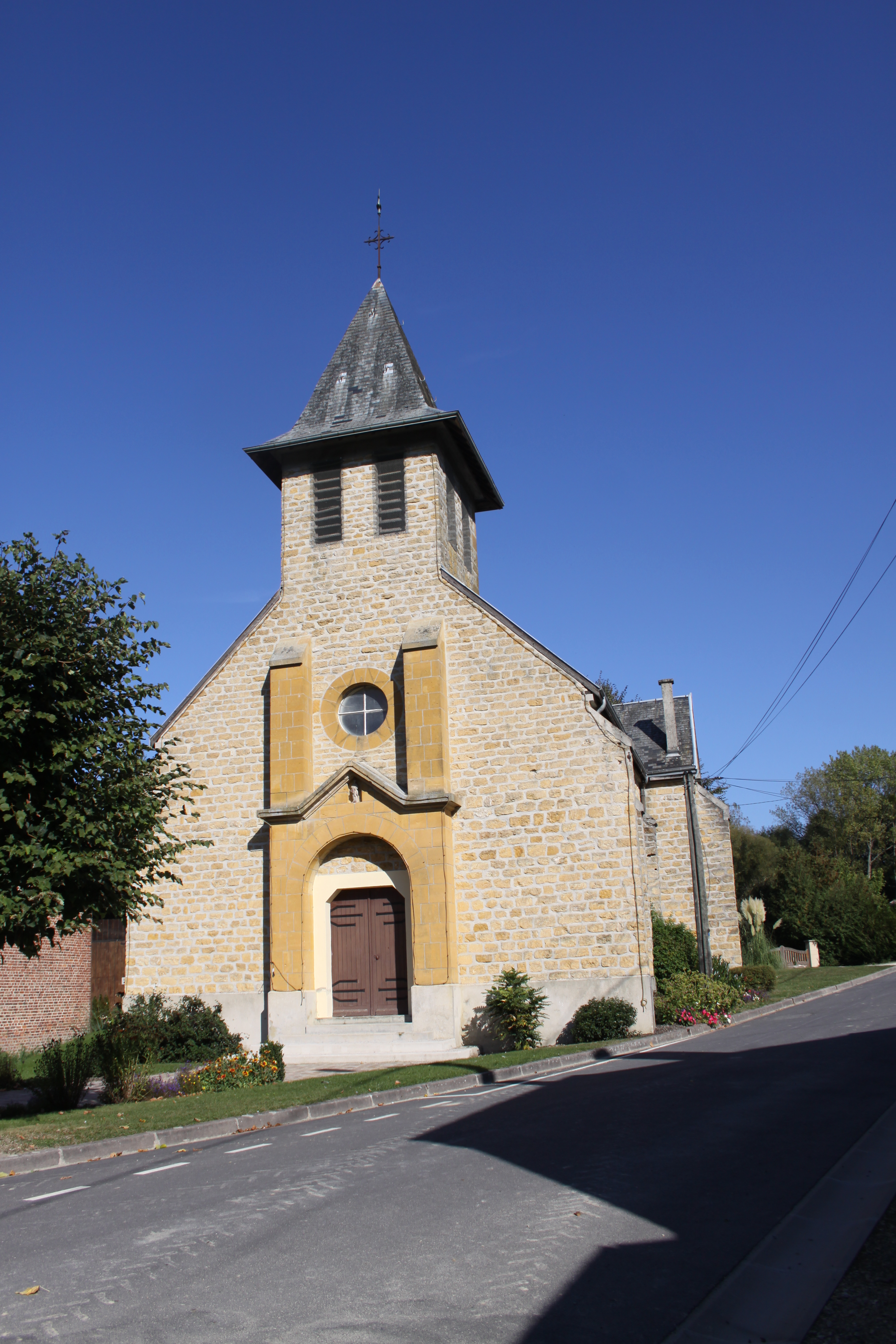
- The church in Toges

- Coat of arms
- Location of Toges
- Location within France Location within Grand Est
- Coordinates: 49°25′34″N 4°46′41″E
- Country: France
- Region: Grand Est
- Department: Ardennes
- Arrondissement: Vouziers
- Canton: Vouziers
- Intercommunality: Argonne Ardennaise

Government
  - Mayor (2020–2026): Roland Canivenq
- Area^{1}: 3.44 km^{2} (1.33 sq mi)
- Elevation: 165 m (541 ft)
- Population (2023): 90
  - Density: 26/km^{2} (68/sq mi)
- Time zone: UTC+01:00 (CET)
  - Summer (DST): UTC+02:00 (CEST)
- INSEE/Postal code: 08453 /08400
- ^{1} French Land Register data, which excludes lakes, ponds, glaciers > 1 km^{2} (0.386 sq mi or 247 acres) and river estuaries.

Toges (French pronunciation: [tɔʒ]) is a commune in the Ardennes department in northern France.

== Population ==
Historical population
Year	Pop.	±% p.a.
1968	134	—
1975	115	−2.16%
1982	105	−1.29%
1990	96	−1.11%
1999	94	−0.23%
2007	91	−0.40%
2012	97	+1.29%
2017	101	+0.81%
2023	90	−1.90%
Source: INSEE

== See also ==
- Communes of the Ardennes department
