= La Berlière =

- Commune
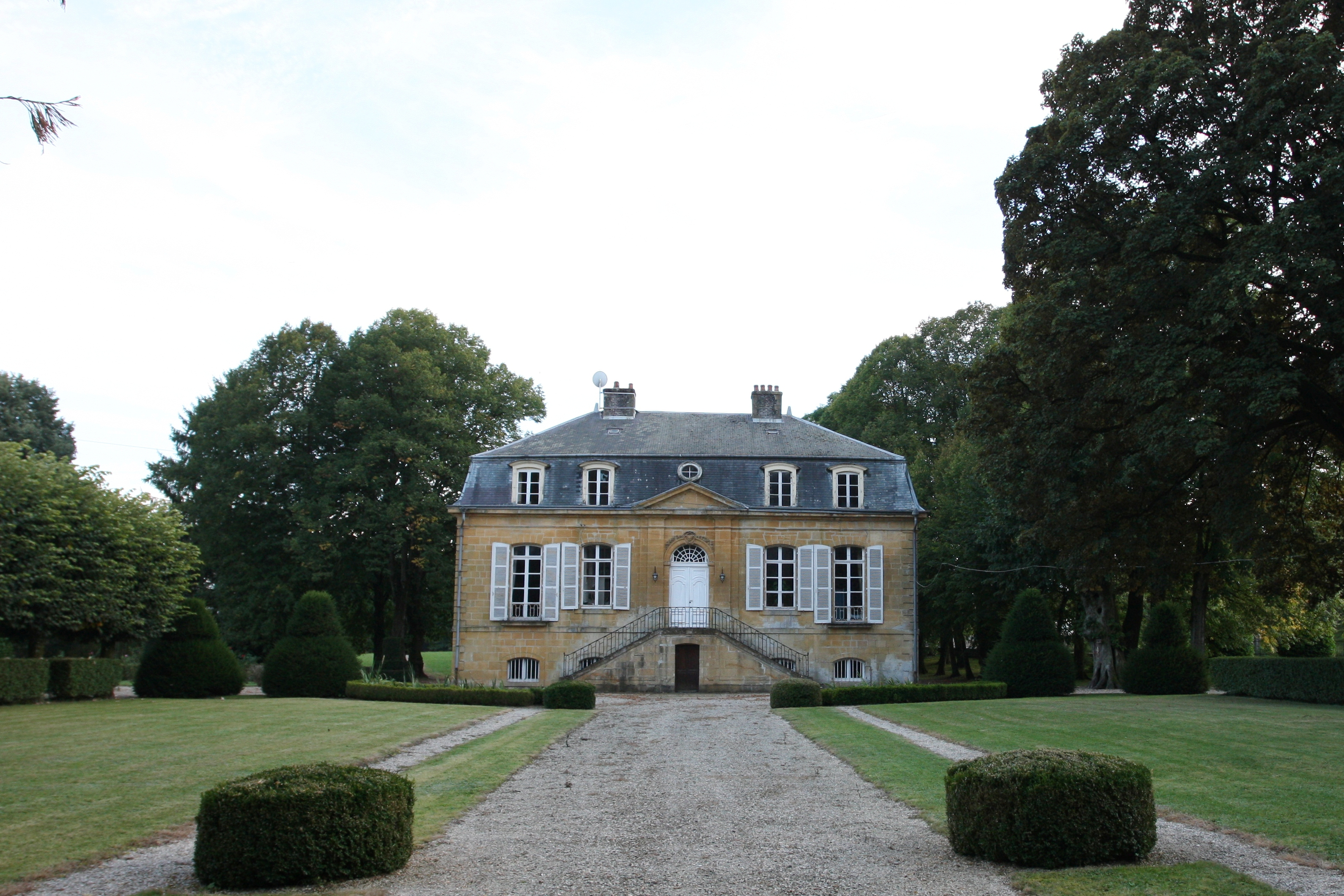
- Chateau
- Location of La Berlière
- Location within France Location within Grand Est
- Coordinates: 49°31′23″N 4°55′14″E
- Country: France
- Region: Grand Est
- Department: Ardennes
- Arrondissement: Vouziers
- Canton: Vouziers
- Intercommunality: Argonne Ardennaise

Government
  - Mayor (2020–2026): Jean-Marc Louis
- Area^{1}: 10.54 km^{2} (4.07 sq mi)
- Elevation: 200 m (660 ft)
- Highest elevation: 328 m (1,076 ft)
- Lowest elevation: 189 m (620 ft)
- Population (2023): 38
  - Density: 3.6/km^{2} (9.3/sq mi)
- Time zone: UTC+01:00 (CET)
  - Summer (DST): UTC+02:00 (CEST)
- INSEE/Postal code: 08061 /08240
- ^{1} French Land Register data, which excludes lakes, ponds, glaciers > 1 km^{2} (0.386 sq mi or 247 acres) and river estuaries.

La Berlière (French pronunciation: [la bɛʁljɛʁ]) is a commune in the Ardennes department in northern France.

== Population ==
Historical population
Year	Pop.	±% p.a.
1968	86	—
1975	66	−3.71%
1982	60	−1.35%
1990	41	−4.65%
1999	32	−2.72%
2007	45	+4.35%
2012	47	+0.87%
2017	40	−3.17%
2023	38	−0.85%
Source: INSEE

== See also ==
- Communes of the Ardennes department
