= Germont =

- Commune
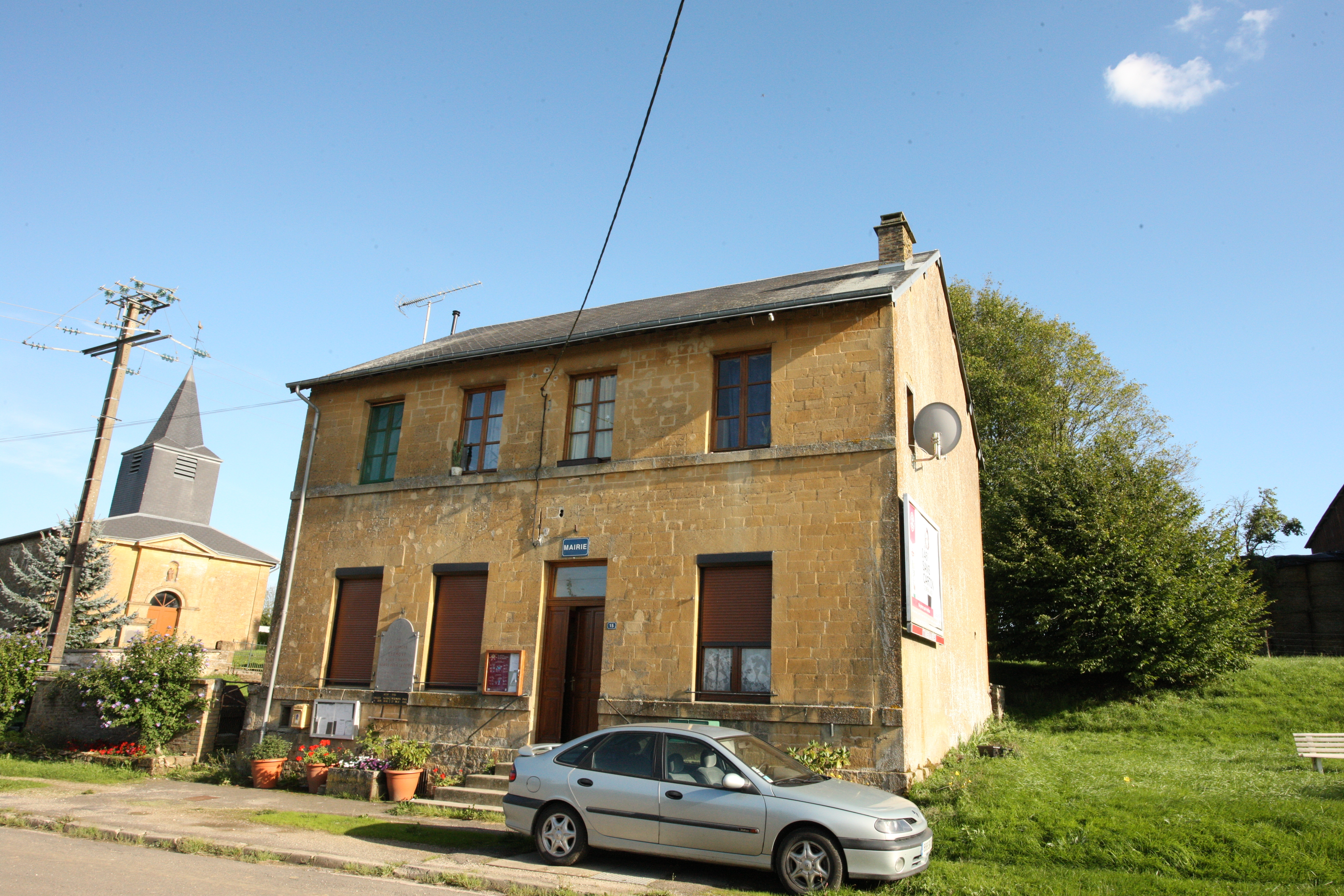
- Town hall

- Coat of arms
- Location of Germont
- Location within France Location within Grand Est
- Coordinates: 49°26′15″N 4°52′37″E
- Country: France
- Region: Grand Est
- Department: Ardennes
- Arrondissement: Vouziers
- Canton: Vouziers
- Intercommunality: Argonne Ardennaise

Government
  - Mayor (2023–2026): Michaël Kmita
- Area^{1}: 4.77 km^{2} (1.84 sq mi)
- Elevation: 180 m (590 ft)
- Highest elevation: 218 m (715 ft)
- Lowest elevation: 165 m (541 ft)
- Population (2023): 51
  - Density: 11/km^{2} (28/sq mi)
- Time zone: UTC+01:00 (CET)
  - Summer (DST): UTC+02:00 (CEST)
- INSEE/Postal code: 08186 /08240
- ^{1} French Land Register data, which excludes lakes, ponds, glaciers > 1 km^{2} (0.386 sq mi or 247 acres) and river estuaries.

Germont (French pronunciation: [ʒɛʁmɔ̃]) is a commune in the Ardennes department in northern France.

== Population ==
Historical population
Year	Pop.	±% p.a.
1968	61	—
1975	51	−2.53%
1982	52	+0.28%
1990	51	−0.24%
1999	35	−4.10%
2007	40	+1.68%
2012	46	+2.83%
2017	48	+0.85%
2023	51	+1.02%
Source: INSEE

== See also ==
- Communes of the Ardennes department
