= Oches =

- Commune
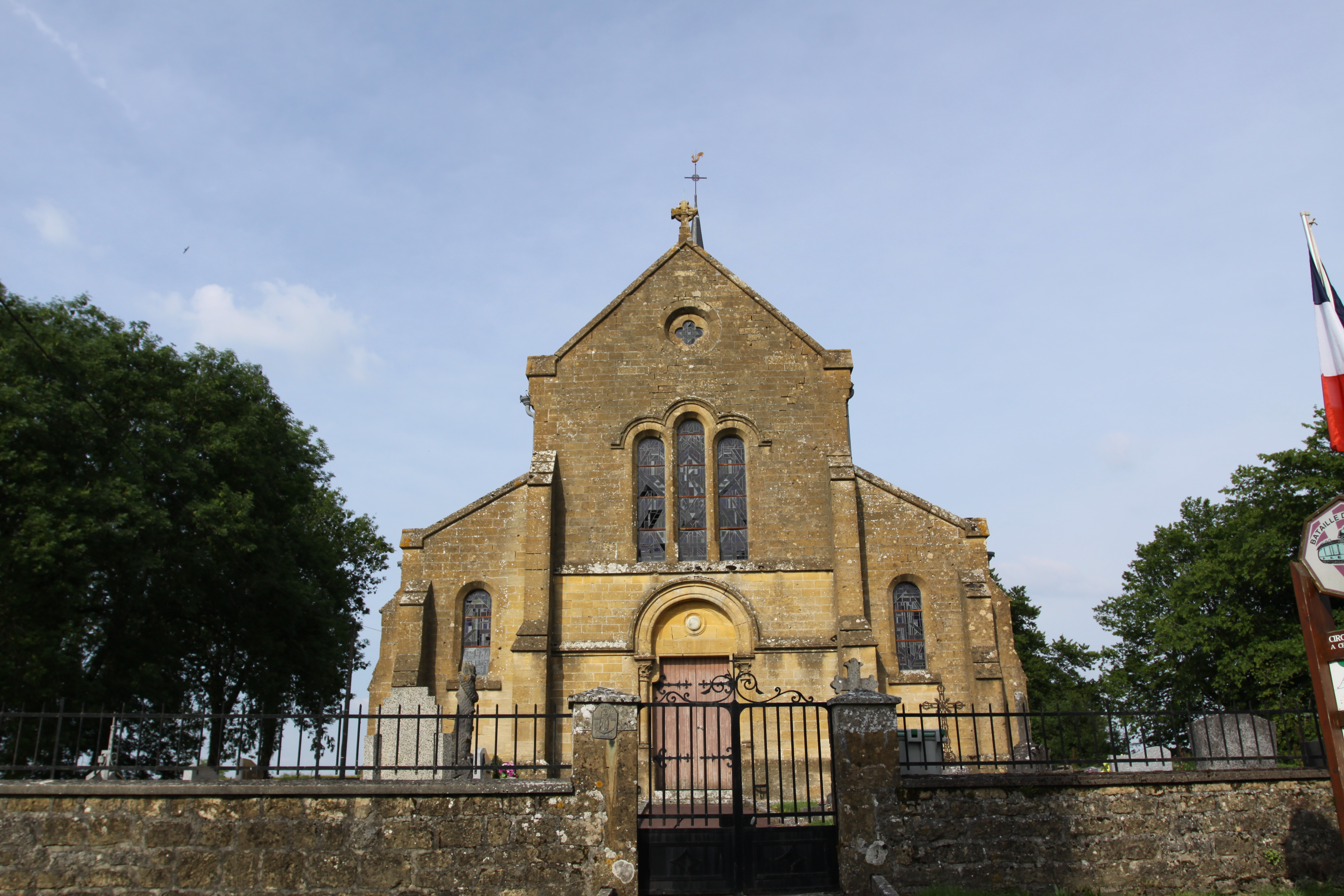
- The church in Oches
- Location of Oches
- Location within France Location within Grand Est
- Coordinates: 49°30′18″N 4°55′37″E
- Country: France
- Region: Grand Est
- Department: Ardennes
- Arrondissement: Vouziers
- Canton: Vouziers
- Intercommunality: Argonne Ardennaise

Government
  - Mayor (2020–2026): Michel Rataux
- Area^{1}: 6.76 km^{2} (2.61 sq mi)
- Elevation: 200 m (660 ft)
- Highest elevation: 270 m (890 ft)
- Lowest elevation: 182 m (597 ft)
- Population (2023): 33
  - Density: 4.9/km^{2} (13/sq mi)
- Time zone: UTC+01:00 (CET)
  - Summer (DST): UTC+02:00 (CEST)
- INSEE/Postal code: 08332 /08240
- ^{1} French Land Register data, which excludes lakes, ponds, glaciers > 1 km^{2} (0.386 sq mi or 247 acres) and river estuaries.

Oches (French pronunciation: [ɔʃ]) is a commune in the Ardennes department in northern France.

== Population ==
Historical population
| Year | Pop. | ±% p.a. |
|---|---|---|
| 1968 | 55 | — |
| 1975 | 48 | −1.93% |
| 1982 | 39 | −2.92% |
| 1990 | 43 | +1.23% |
| 1999 | 41 | −0.53% |
| 2007 | 31 | −3.43% |
| 2012 | 42 | +6.26% |
| 2017 | 44 | +0.93% |
| 2023 | 33 | −4.68% |
Source: INSEE

== See also ==
- Communes of the Ardennes department
