= Haraucourt, Ardennes =

Haraucourt
- Commune
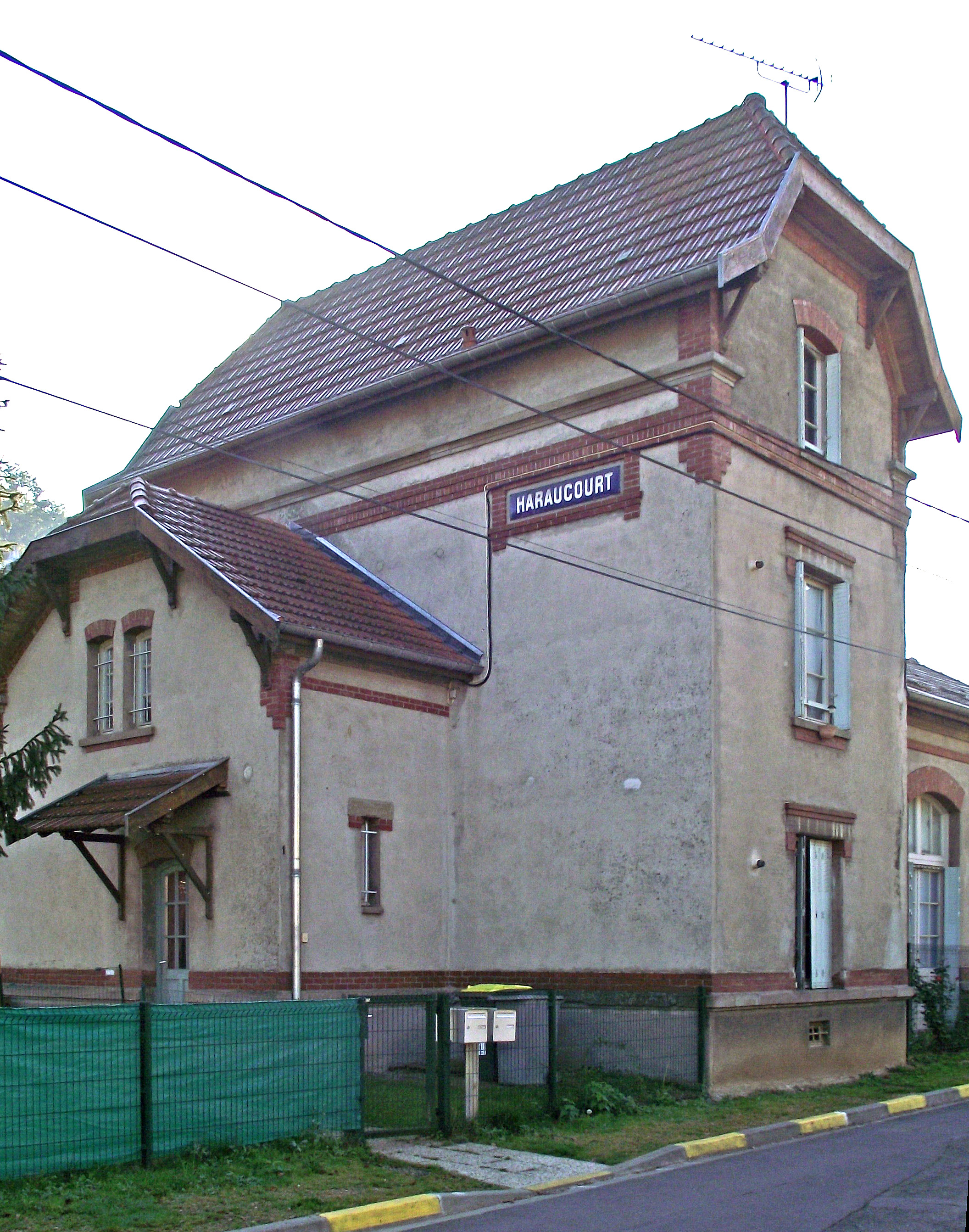
- Train station

- Coat of arms
- Location of Haraucourt
- Location within France Location within Grand Est
- Coordinates: 49°37′23″N 4°57′43″E
- Country: France
- Region: Grand Est
- Department: Ardennes
- Arrondissement: Sedan
- Canton: Vouziers

Government
  - Mayor (2020–2026): Frédéric Latour
- Area^{1}: 11.53 km^{2} (4.45 sq mi)
- Elevation: 178 m (584 ft)
- Population (2023): 699
  - Density: 60.6/km^{2} (157/sq mi)
- Time zone: UTC+01:00 (CET)
  - Summer (DST): UTC+02:00 (CEST)
- INSEE/Postal code: 08211 /08450
- ^{1} French Land Register data, which excludes lakes, ponds, glaciers > 1 km^{2} (0.386 sq mi or 247 acres) and river estuaries.

Haraucourt (French pronunciation: [aʁokuʁ]) is a commune in the Ardennes department in northern France.

== Population ==
Historical population
Year	Pop.	±% p.a.
1968	901	—
1975	889	−0.19%
1982	859	−0.49%
1990	841	−0.26%
1999	785	−0.76%
2007	772	−0.21%
2012	747	−0.66%
2017	731	−0.43%
2023	699	−0.74%
Source: INSEE

== See also ==
- Communes of the Ardennes department
