= Remaucourt =

Remaucourt may refer to the following places in France:

- Remaucourt, Aisne, a commune in the department of Aisne
- Remaucourt, Ardennes, a commune in the department of Ardennes
