= Gruyère (disambiguation) =

Gruyère is a hard yellow cheese made from cow's milk, named after the town of Gruyères.

Gruyère or Gruyere may also refer to:

- Gruyère (district), a district of the canton of Fribourg in Switzerland
- La Gruyère (newspaper), Swiss newspaper
- Gruyère cream, a cream from the Gruyère district
- Gruyères, a town in the Gruyère district, known for the cheese named after it
- Gruyères, Ardennes, a commune in France
- Gruyere, Victoria, a town in the Yarra Valley wine region east of Melbourne, Australia
- Gruyere Gold Mine, a mine in Western Australia
