= Saint-Jean-aux-Bois =

Saint-Jean-aux-Bois may refer to the following places in France:

- Saint-Jean-aux-Bois, Ardennes, a commune in the Ardennes department
- Saint-Jean-aux-Bois, Oise, a commune in the Oise department
