= Renneville =

Renneville may refer to:

- communes in France:
  - Renneville, Ardennes, in the Ardennes département
  - Renneville, Eure, in the Eure département
  - Renneville, Haute-Garonne, in the Haute-Garonne département
- René Auguste Constantin de Renneville (1650–1723), author and famous prisoner of the Bastille
