= Marlemont =

- Commune
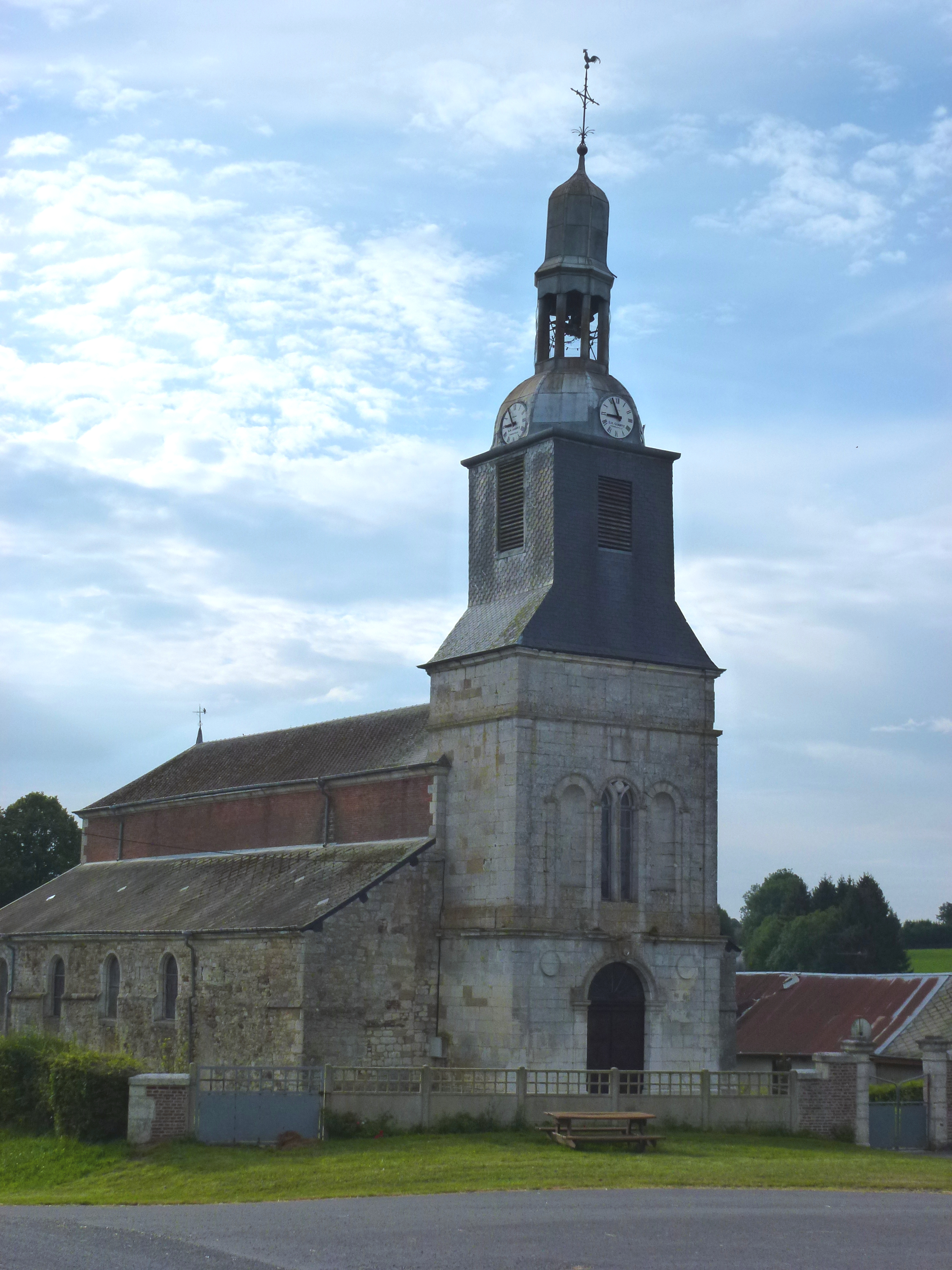
- The church in Marlemont

- Coat of arms
- Location of Marlemont
- Location within France Location within Grand Est
- Coordinates: 49°45′02″N 4°22′29″E
- Country: France
- Region: Grand Est
- Department: Ardennes
- Arrondissement: Charleville-Mézières
- Canton: Signy-l'Abbaye

Government
  - Mayor (2020–2026): Patrick Larue
- Area^{1}: 10.06 km^{2} (3.88 sq mi)
- Elevation: 292 m (958 ft)
- Population (2023): 126
  - Density: 12.5/km^{2} (32.4/sq mi)
- Time zone: UTC+01:00 (CET)
  - Summer (DST): UTC+02:00 (CEST)
- INSEE/Postal code: 08277 /08290
- ^{1} French Land Register data, which excludes lakes, ponds, glaciers > 1 km^{2} (0.386 sq mi or 247 acres) and river estuaries.

Marlemont (French pronunciation: [maʁləmɔ̃]) is a commune in the Ardennes department in northern France.

== Population ==
Historical population
| Year | Pop. | ±% p.a. |
|---|---|---|
| 1968 | 168 | — |
| 1975 | 156 | −1.05% |
| 1982 | 142 | −1.33% |
| 1990 | 112 | −2.92% |
| 1999 | 110 | −0.20% |
| 2007 | 141 | +3.15% |
| 2012 | 147 | +0.84% |
| 2017 | 140 | −0.97% |
| 2023 | 126 | −1.74% |
Source: INSEE

== See also ==
- Communes of the Ardennes department
