= Puiseux, Ardennes =

Puiseux
- Commune
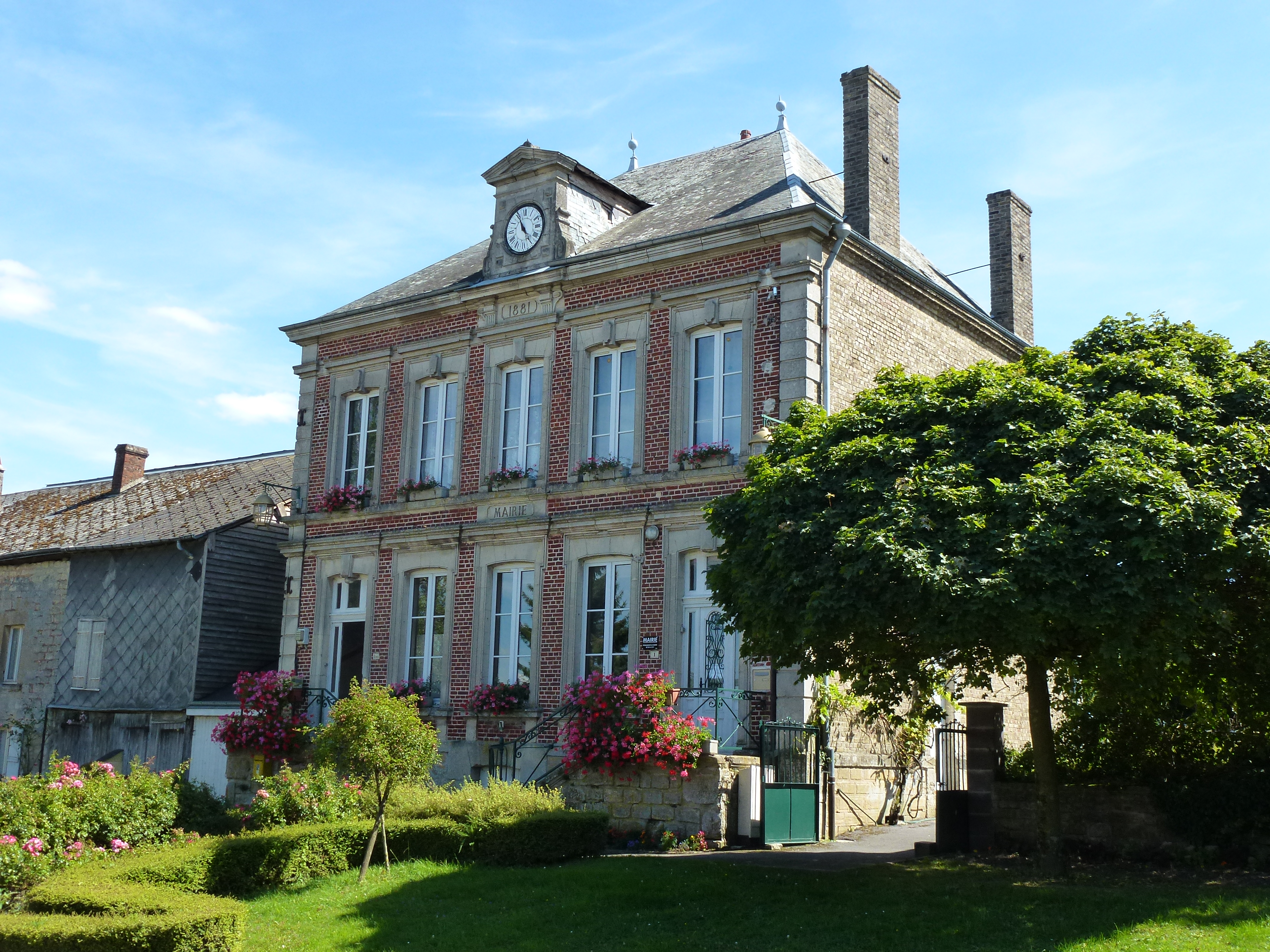
- The town hall in Puiseux

- Coat of arms
- Location of Puiseux
- Location within France Location within Grand Est
- Coordinates: 49°35′36″N 4°32′32″E
- Country: France
- Region: Grand Est
- Department: Ardennes
- Arrondissement: Rethel
- Canton: Signy-l'Abbaye
- Intercommunality: Crêtes Préardennaises

Government
  - Mayor (2020–2026): Arnaud Bocquillon
- Area^{1}: 3.41 km^{2} (1.32 sq mi)
- Elevation: 179 m (587 ft)
- Population (2023): 108
  - Density: 31.7/km^{2} (82.0/sq mi)
- Time zone: UTC+01:00 (CET)
  - Summer (DST): UTC+02:00 (CEST)
- INSEE/Postal code: 08348 /08270
- ^{1} French Land Register data, which excludes lakes, ponds, glaciers > 1 km^{2} (0.386 sq mi or 247 acres) and river estuaries.

Puiseux (French pronunciation: [pɥizø]) is a commune in the Ardennes department in northern France.

== Population ==
Historical population
Year	Pop.	±% p.a.
1968	102	—
1975	91	−1.62%
1982	84	−1.14%
1990	96	+1.68%
1999	80	−2.01%
2007	101	+2.96%
2012	117	+2.98%
2017	116	−0.17%
2023	108	−1.18%
Source: INSEE

== See also ==
- Communes of the Ardennes department
