= Dommery =

- Commune
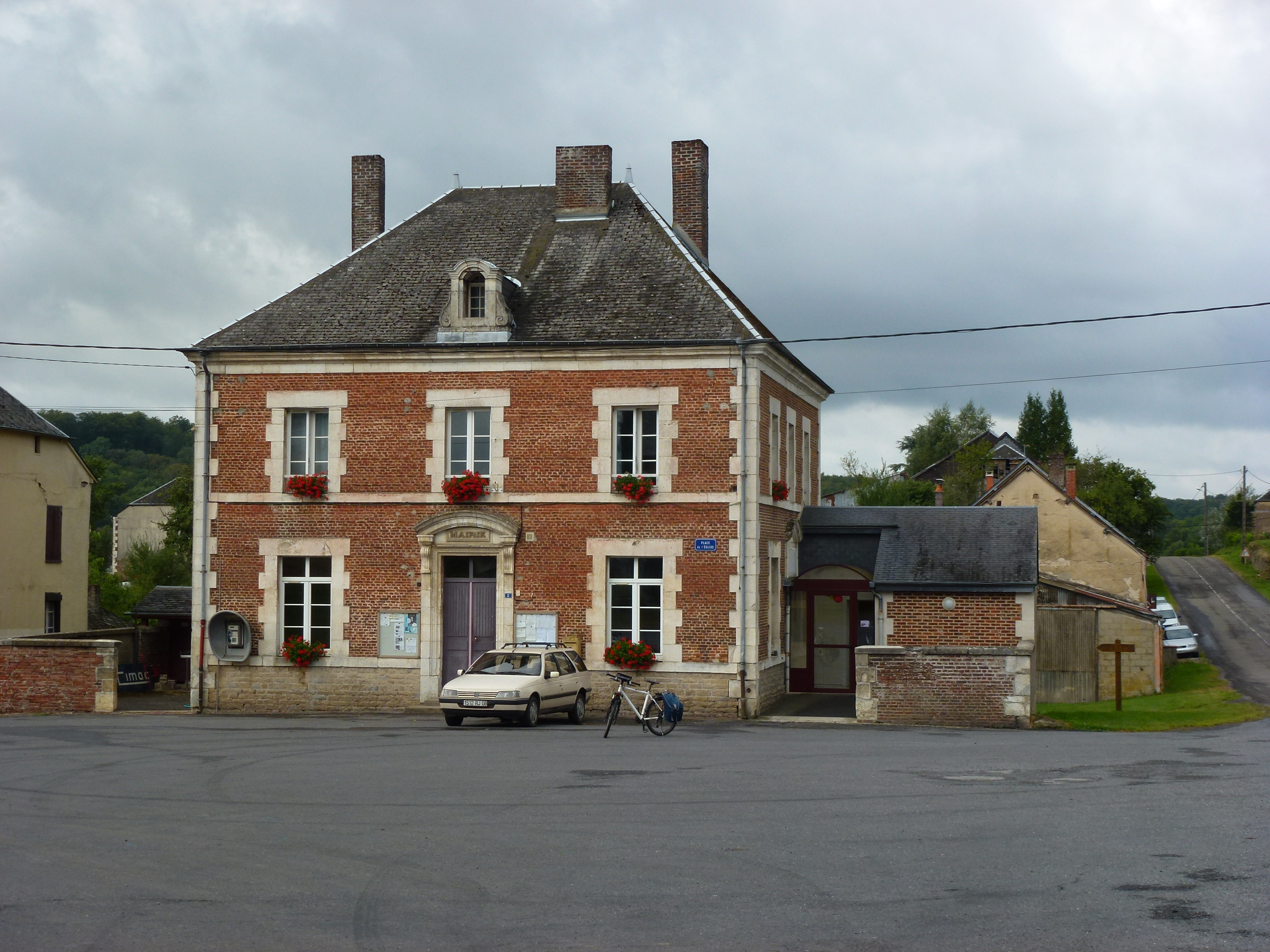
- The town hall in Dommery

- Coat of arms
- Location of Dommery
- Location within France Location within Grand Est
- Coordinates: 49°40′37″N 4°28′27″E
- Country: France
- Region: Grand Est
- Department: Ardennes
- Arrondissement: Charleville-Mézières
- Canton: Signy-l'Abbaye
- Intercommunality: Crêtes Préardennaises

Government
  - Mayor (2020–2026): Christelle Duquenois
- Area^{1}: 10.66 km^{2} (4.12 sq mi)
- Elevation: 220 m (720 ft)
- Population (2023): 186
  - Density: 17.4/km^{2} (45.2/sq mi)
- Time zone: UTC+01:00 (CET)
  - Summer (DST): UTC+02:00 (CEST)
- INSEE/Postal code: 08141 /08460
- ^{1} French Land Register data, which excludes lakes, ponds, glaciers > 1 km^{2} (0.386 sq mi or 247 acres) and river estuaries.

Dommery (French pronunciation: [dɔmʁi]) is a commune in the Ardennes department in northern France.

== Population ==
Historical population
| Year | Pop. | ±% p.a. |
|---|---|---|
| 1968 | 191 | — |
| 1975 | 164 | −2.15% |
| 1982 | 150 | −1.27% |
| 1990 | 166 | +1.27% |
| 1999 | 175 | +0.59% |
| 2007 | 187 | +0.83% |
| 2012 | 186 | −0.11% |
| 2017 | 181 | −0.54% |
| 2023 | 186 | +0.46% |
Source: INSEE

== See also ==
- Communes of the Ardennes department
