= Canton of Signy-l'Abbaye =

Coordinates: 49.70°N 4.42°E

- Canton
- Situation of the canton of Signy-l'Abbaye in the department of Ardennes
- Country: France
- Region: Grand Est
- Department: Ardennes
- No. of communes: {{{nbcomm}}}
- Population (2023): 15,213
- INSEE code: 0817

The canton of Signy-l'Abbaye is an administrative division of the Ardennes department, northern France. Its borders were modified at the French canton reorganisation which came into effect in March 2015. Its seat is in Signy-l'Abbaye.

It consists of the following communes:

1. Antheny
2. Aouste
3. Aubigny-les-Pothées
4. Auboncourt-Vauzelles
5. Barbaise
6. Blanchefosse-et-Bay
7. Bossus-lès-Rumigny
8. Cernion
9. Champlin
10. Chappes
11. Chaumont-Porcien
12. Chesnois-Auboncourt
13. Clavy-Warby
14. Dommery
15. Doumely-Bégny
16. Draize
17. L'Échelle
18. Estrebay
19. Faissault
20. Faux
21. La Férée
22. Flaignes-Havys
23. Fraillicourt
24. Le Fréty
25. Girondelle
26. Givron
27. Grandchamp
28. Gruyères
29. Hagnicourt
30. Hannappes
31. Jandun
32. Justine-Herbigny
33. Lalobbe
34. Launois-sur-Vence
35. Lépron-les-Vallées
36. Liart
37. Logny-Bogny
38. Lucquy
39. Maranwez
40. Marby
41. Marlemont
42. Mesmont
43. Montmeillant
44. Neufmaison
45. La Neuville-lès-Wasigny
46. Neuvizy
47. Novion-Porcien
48. Prez
49. Puiseux
50. Raillicourt
51. Remaucourt
52. Renneville
53. Rocquigny
54. La Romagne
55. Rouvroy-sur-Audry
56. Rubigny
57. Rumigny
58. Saint-Jean-aux-Bois
59. Saulces-Monclin
60. Sery
61. Signy-l'Abbaye
62. Sorcy-Bauthémont
63. Thin-le-Moutier
64. Vaux-lès-Rubigny
65. Vaux-Montreuil
66. Vaux-Villaine
67. Viel-Saint-Remy
68. Villers-le-Tourneur
69. Wagnon
70. Wasigny
71. Wignicourt
