= Wagnon =

- Commune
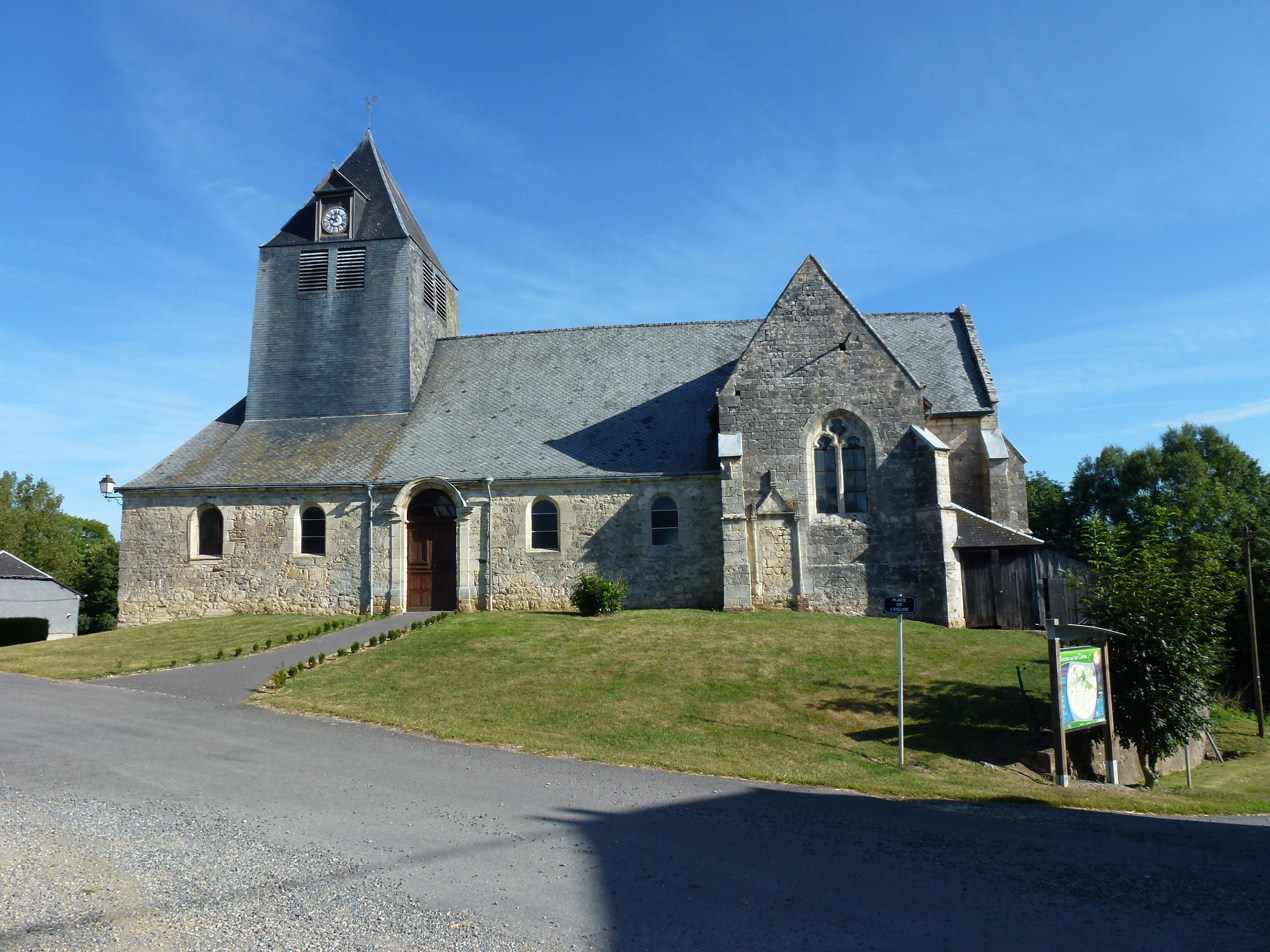
- The church in Wagnon

- Coat of arms
- Location of Wagnon
- Location within France Location within Grand Est
- Coordinates: 49°37′48″N 4°25′46″E
- Country: France
- Region: Grand Est
- Department: Ardennes
- Arrondissement: Rethel
- Canton: Signy-l'Abbaye
- Intercommunality: Crêtes Préardennaises

Government
  - Mayor (2020–2026): Jérôme Lopez
- Area^{1}: 15.28 km^{2} (5.90 sq mi)
- Elevation: 160 m (520 ft)
- Population (2023): 106
  - Density: 6.94/km^{2} (18.0/sq mi)
- Time zone: UTC+01:00 (CET)
  - Summer (DST): UTC+02:00 (CEST)
- INSEE/Postal code: 08496 /08270
- ^{1} French Land Register data, which excludes lakes, ponds, glaciers > 1 km^{2} (0.386 sq mi or 247 acres) and river estuaries.

Wagnon is a commune in the Ardennes department in northern France.

== Population ==
Historical population
Year	Pop.	±% p.a.
1968	157	—
1975	149	−0.74%
1982	118	−3.28%
1990	96	−2.55%
1999	96	+0.00%
2007	106	+1.25%
2012	122	+2.85%
2017	128	+0.96%
2023	106	−3.09%
Source: INSEE

== See also ==
- Communes of the Ardennes department
