= Raillicourt =

- Commune
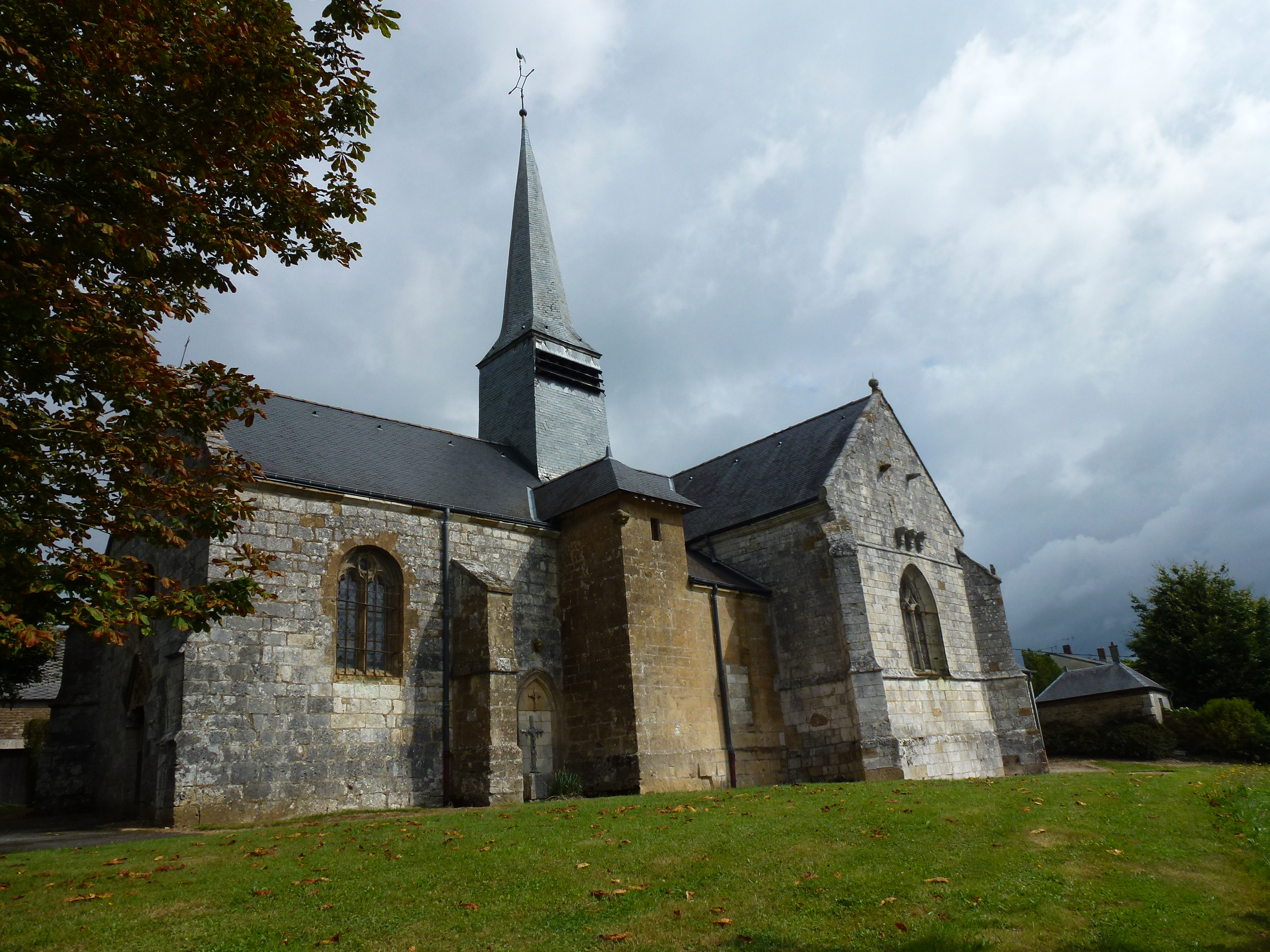
- The church in Raillicourt
- Location of Raillicourt
- Location within France Location within Grand Est
- Coordinates: 49°39′08″N 4°35′13″E
- Country: France
- Region: Grand Est
- Department: Ardennes
- Arrondissement: Charleville-Mézières
- Canton: Signy-l'Abbaye
- Intercommunality: Crêtes Préardennaises

Government
  - Mayor (2020–2026): Jacques Vincent
- Area^{1}: 6.87 km^{2} (2.65 sq mi)
- Elevation: 192 m (630 ft)
- Population (2023): 229
  - Density: 33.3/km^{2} (86.3/sq mi)
- Time zone: UTC+01:00 (CET)
  - Summer (DST): UTC+02:00 (CEST)
- INSEE/Postal code: 08352 /08430
- ^{1} French Land Register data, which excludes lakes, ponds, glaciers > 1 km^{2} (0.386 sq mi or 247 acres) and river estuaries.

Raillicourt is a commune in the Ardennes department in northern France. It lies on the river Vence.

== Population ==
Historical population
Year	Pop.	±% p.a.
1968	139	—
1975	141	+0.20%
1982	192	+4.51%
1990	200	+0.51%
1999	179	−1.23%
2007	213	+2.20%
2012	218	+0.47%
2017	202	−1.51%
2023	229	+2.11%
Source: INSEE

== See also ==
- Communes of the Ardennes department
