= Lépron-les-Vallées =

- Commune
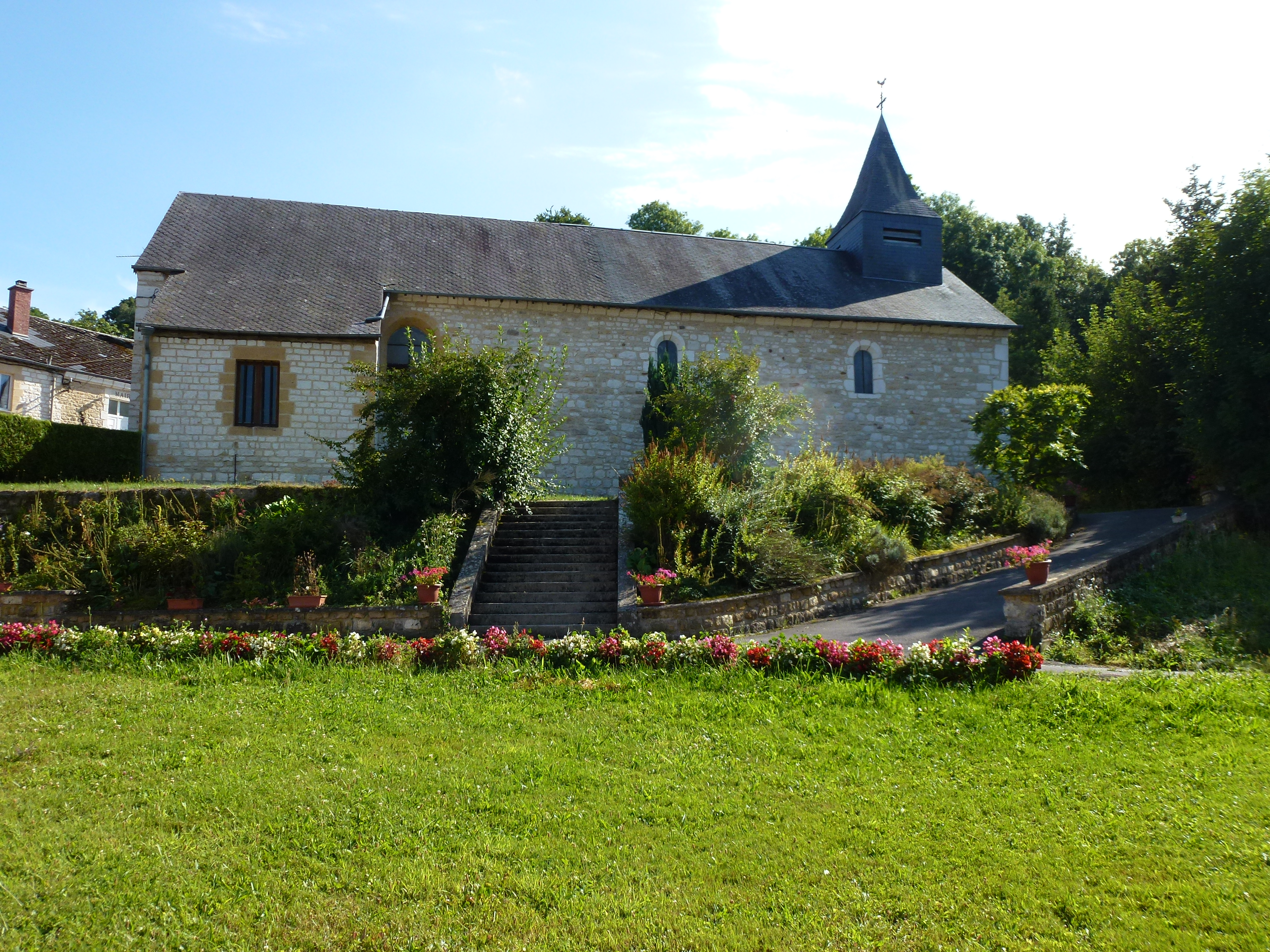
- The church in Lépron-les-Vallées

- Coat of arms
- Location of Lépron-les-Vallées
- Location within France Location within Grand Est
- Coordinates: 49°45′42″N 4°27′10″E
- Country: France
- Region: Grand Est
- Department: Ardennes
- Arrondissement: Charleville-Mézières
- Canton: Signy-l'Abbaye

Government
  - Mayor (2020–2026): Régis Taton
- Area^{1}: 6.42 km^{2} (2.48 sq mi)
- Elevation: 240 m (790 ft)
- Population (2023): 61
  - Density: 9.5/km^{2} (25/sq mi)
- Time zone: UTC+01:00 (CET)
  - Summer (DST): UTC+02:00 (CEST)
- INSEE/Postal code: 08251 /08150
- ^{1} French Land Register data, which excludes lakes, ponds, glaciers > 1 km^{2} (0.386 sq mi or 247 acres) and river estuaries.

Lépron-les-Vallées (French pronunciation: [lepʁɔ̃ le vale]) is a commune in the Ardennes department in northern France.

== Population ==
Historical population
Year	Pop.	±% p.a.
1968	72	—
1975	59	−2.80%
1982	61	+0.48%
1990	50	−2.45%
1999	59	+1.86%
2007	84	+4.51%
2012	98	+3.13%
2017	78	−4.46%
2023	61	−4.01%
Source: INSEE

== See also ==
- Communes of the Ardennes department
