= Villers-le-Tourneur =

- Commune
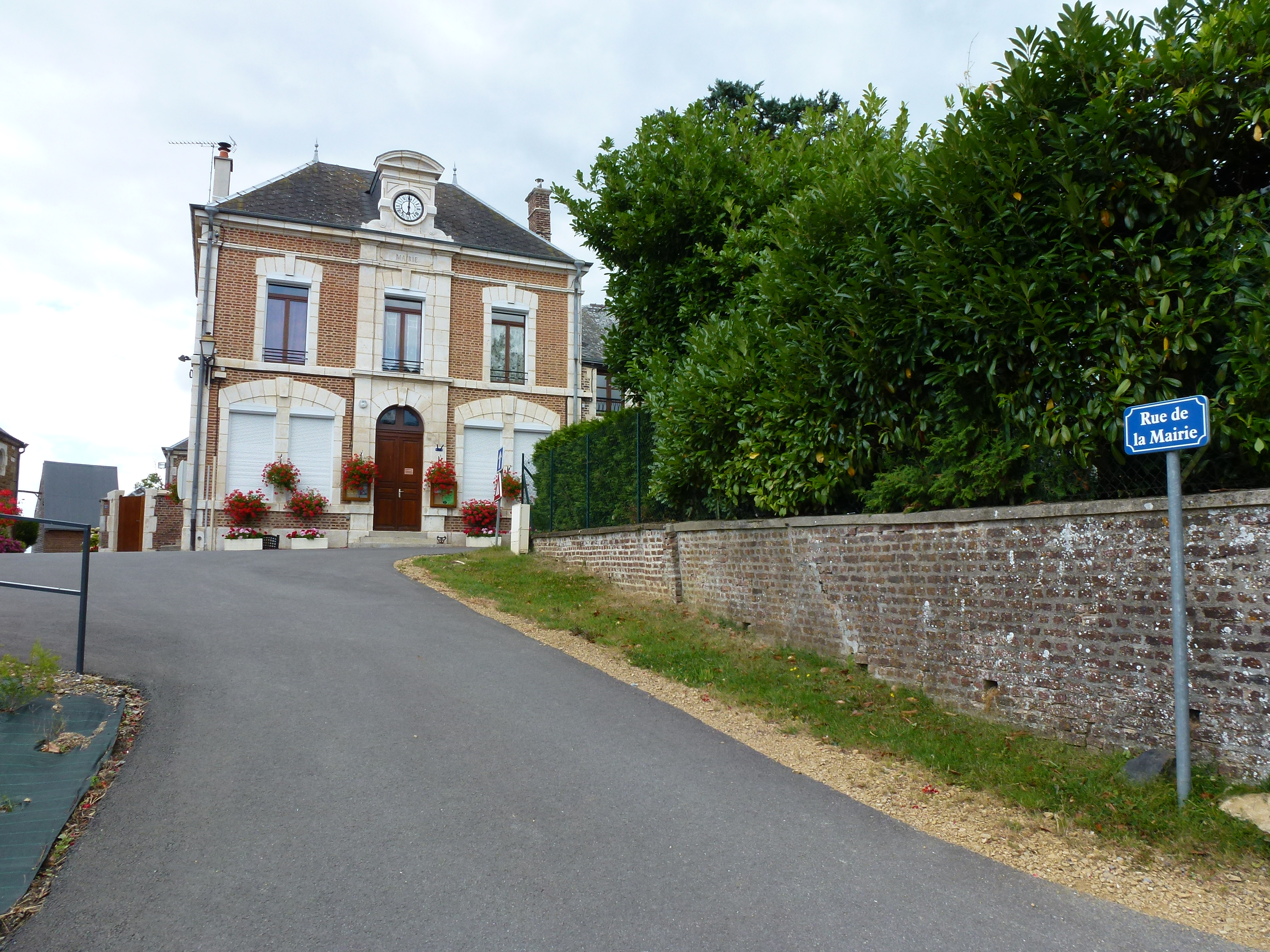
- Town hall
- Location of Villers-le-Tourneur
- Location within France Location within Grand Est
- Coordinates: 49°37′38″N 4°34′04″E
- Country: France
- Region: Grand Est
- Department: Ardennes
- Arrondissement: Rethel
- Canton: Signy-l'Abbaye
- Intercommunality: Crêtes Préardennaises

Government
  - Mayor (2020–2026): Jean-François Derrière
- Area^{1}: 7.85 km^{2} (3.03 sq mi)
- Elevation: 222 m (728 ft)
- Population (2023): 217
  - Density: 27.6/km^{2} (71.6/sq mi)
- Time zone: UTC+01:00 (CET)
  - Summer (DST): UTC+02:00 (CEST)
- INSEE/Postal code: 08479 /08430
- ^{1} French Land Register data, which excludes lakes, ponds, glaciers > 1 km^{2} (0.386 sq mi or 247 acres) and river estuaries.

Villers-le-Tourneur is a commune in the Ardennes department and Grand Est region of north-eastern France.

== Population ==
Historical population
Year	Pop.	±% p.a.
1968	197	—
1975	171	−2.00%
1982	165	−0.51%
1990	141	−1.95%
1999	161	+1.48%
2007	184	+1.68%
2012	174	−1.11%
2017	194	+2.20%
2023	217	+1.88%
Source: INSEE

== See also ==
- Communes of the Ardennes department
