= Lucquy =

- Commune
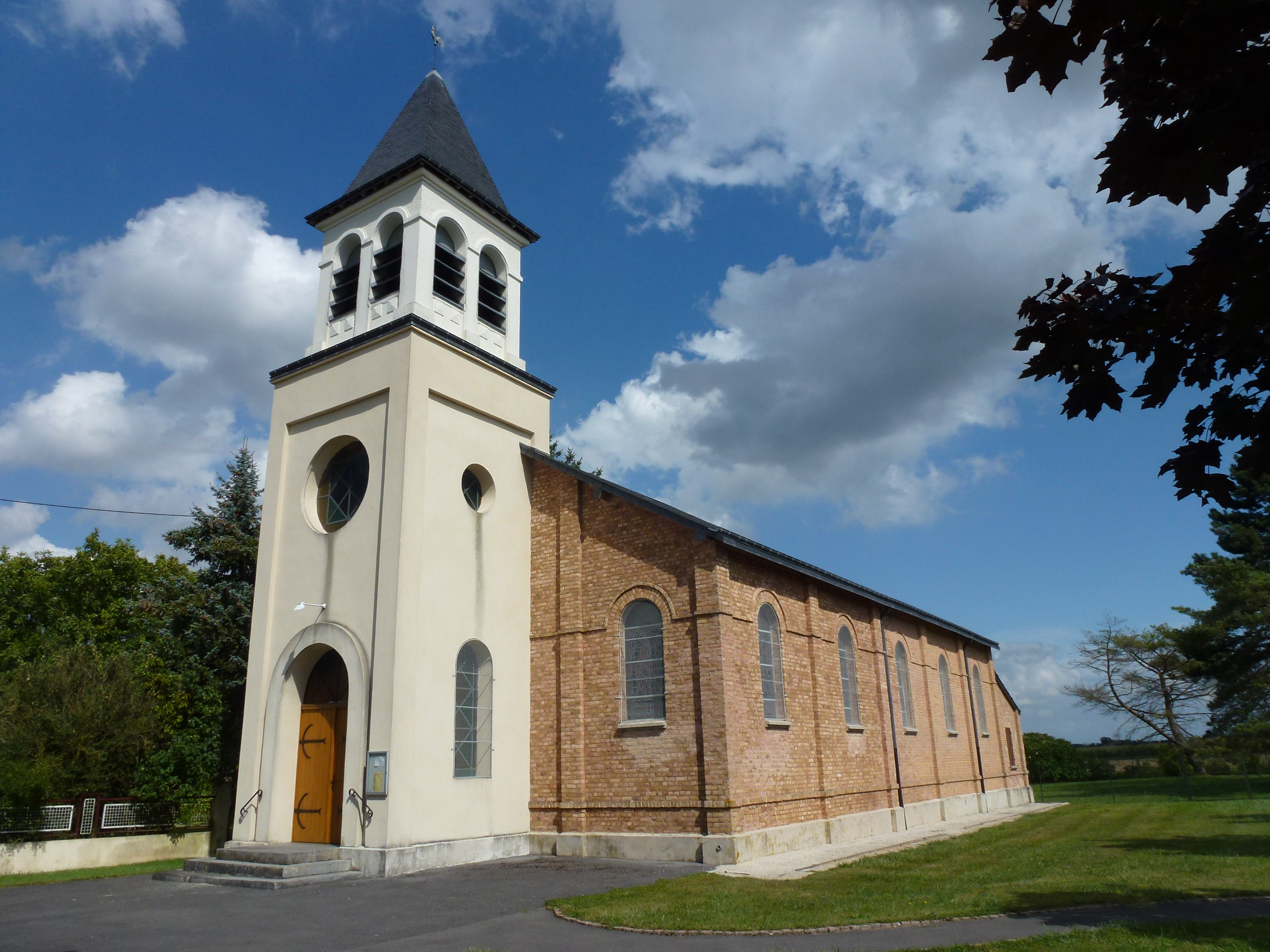
- The church in Lucquy

- Coat of arms
- Location of Lucquy
- Location within France Location within Grand Est
- Coordinates: 49°32′00″N 4°28′43″E
- Country: France
- Region: Grand Est
- Department: Ardennes
- Arrondissement: Rethel
- Canton: Signy-l'Abbaye
- Intercommunality: Crêtes Préardennaises

Government
  - Mayor (2020–2026): Alain Lamorlette
- Area^{1}: 5.07 km^{2} (1.96 sq mi)
- Elevation: 99 m (325 ft)
- Highest elevation: 124 m (407 ft)
- Lowest elevation: 78 m (256 ft)
- Population (2023): 584
  - Density: 115/km^{2} (298/sq mi)
- Time zone: UTC+01:00 (CET)
  - Summer (DST): UTC+02:00 (CEST)
- INSEE/Postal code: 08262 /08300
- ^{1} French Land Register data, which excludes lakes, ponds, glaciers > 1 km^{2} (0.386 sq mi or 247 acres) and river estuaries.

Lucquy (French pronunciation: [lyki]) is a commune in the Ardennes department in northern France.

== Population ==
Historical population
Year	Pop.	±% p.a.
1968	631	—
1975	607	−0.55%
1982	501	−2.70%
1990	455	−1.20%
1999	489	+0.80%
2007	528	+0.96%
2012	613	+3.03%
2017	580	−1.10%
2023	584	+0.11%
Source: INSEE

== See also ==
- Communes of the Ardennes department
