= Lalobbe =

- Commune
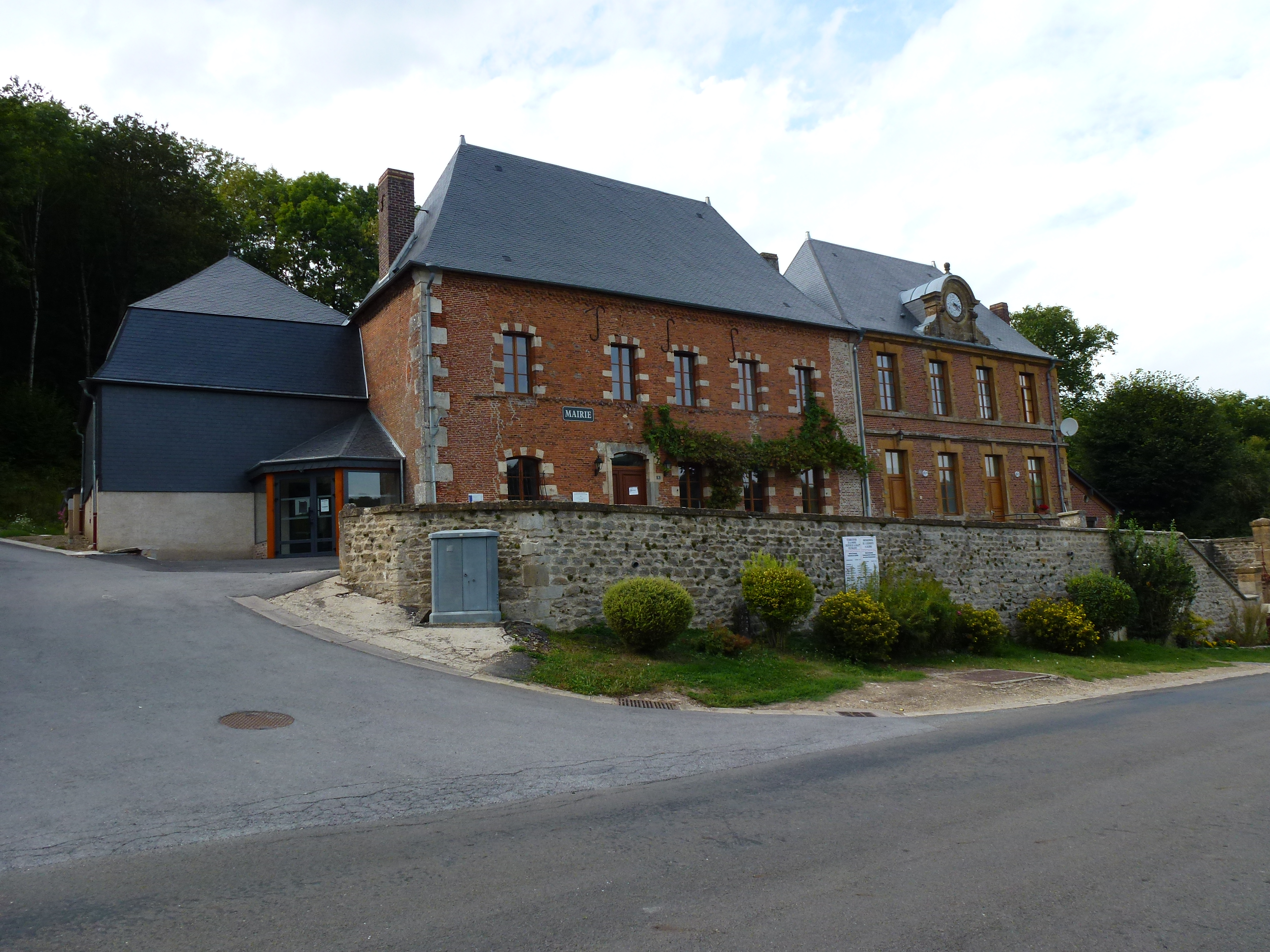
- The town hall in Lalobbe
- Location of Lalobbe
- Location within France Location within Grand Est
- Coordinates: 49°40′12″N 4°22′39″E
- Country: France
- Region: Grand Est
- Department: Ardennes
- Arrondissement: Charleville-Mézières
- Canton: Signy-l'Abbaye
- Intercommunality: Crêtes Préardennaises

Government
  - Mayor (2020–2026): Daniel Colas
- Area^{1}: 9.96 km^{2} (3.85 sq mi)
- Elevation: 138 m (453 ft)
- Population (2023): 166
  - Density: 16.7/km^{2} (43.2/sq mi)
- Time zone: UTC+01:00 (CET)
  - Summer (DST): UTC+02:00 (CEST)
- INSEE/Postal code: 08243 /08460
- ^{1} French Land Register data, which excludes lakes, ponds, glaciers > 1 km^{2} (0.386 sq mi or 247 acres) and river estuaries.

Lalobbe is a commune in the Ardennes department in northern France.

== Population ==
Historical population
Year	Pop.	±% p.a.
1968	264	—
1975	254	−0.55%
1982	240	−0.81%
1990	236	−0.21%
1999	206	−1.50%
2007	193	−0.81%
2012	183	−1.06%
2017	169	−1.58%
2023	166	−0.30%
Source: INSEE

== See also ==
- Communes of the Ardennes department
