= Le Fréty =

- Commune
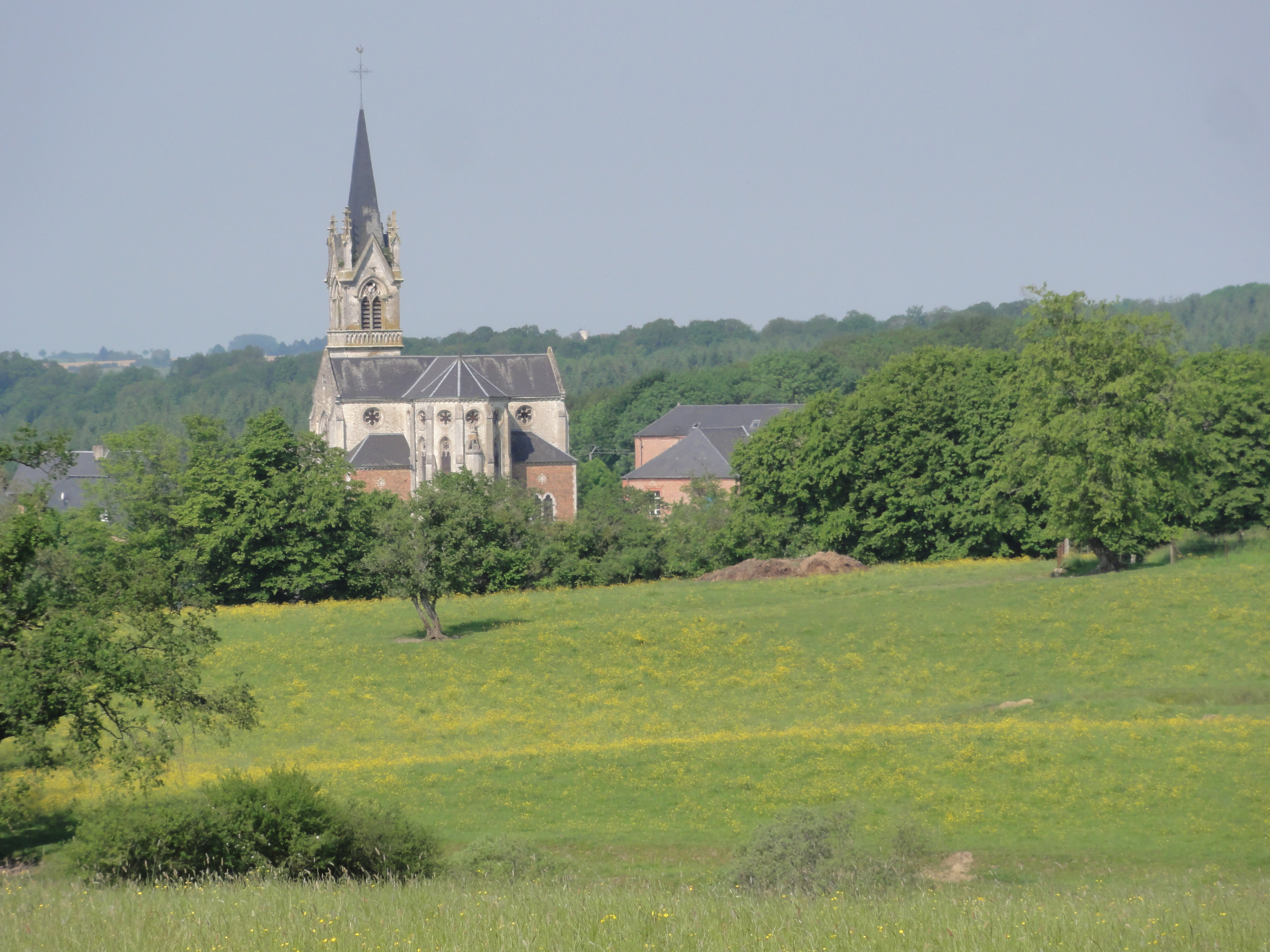
- The church in Le Fréty
- Location of Le Fréty
- Location within France Location within Grand Est
- Coordinates: 49°44′24″N 4°16′59″E
- Country: France
- Region: Grand Est
- Department: Ardennes
- Arrondissement: Charleville-Mézières
- Canton: Signy-l'Abbaye

Government
  - Mayor (2020–2026): Gilbert Clarat
- Area^{1}: 7.09 km^{2} (2.74 sq mi)
- Elevation: 230 m (750 ft)
- Population (2023): 61
  - Density: 8.6/km^{2} (22/sq mi)
- Time zone: UTC+01:00 (CET)
  - Summer (DST): UTC+02:00 (CEST)
- INSEE/Postal code: 08182 /08290
- ^{1} French Land Register data, which excludes lakes, ponds, glaciers > 1 km^{2} (0.386 sq mi or 247 acres) and river estuaries.

Le Fréty (French pronunciation: [lə fʁeti]) is a commune in the Ardennes department in northern France.

== Population ==
Historical population
Year	Pop.	±% p.a.
1968	104	—
1975	72	−5.12%
1982	77	+0.96%
1990	72	−0.84%
1999	71	−0.16%
2007	71	+0.00%
2012	62	−2.67%
2017	58	−1.32%
2023	61	+0.84%
Source: INSEE

== See also ==
- Communes of the Ardennes department
