= Fraillicourt =

- Commune
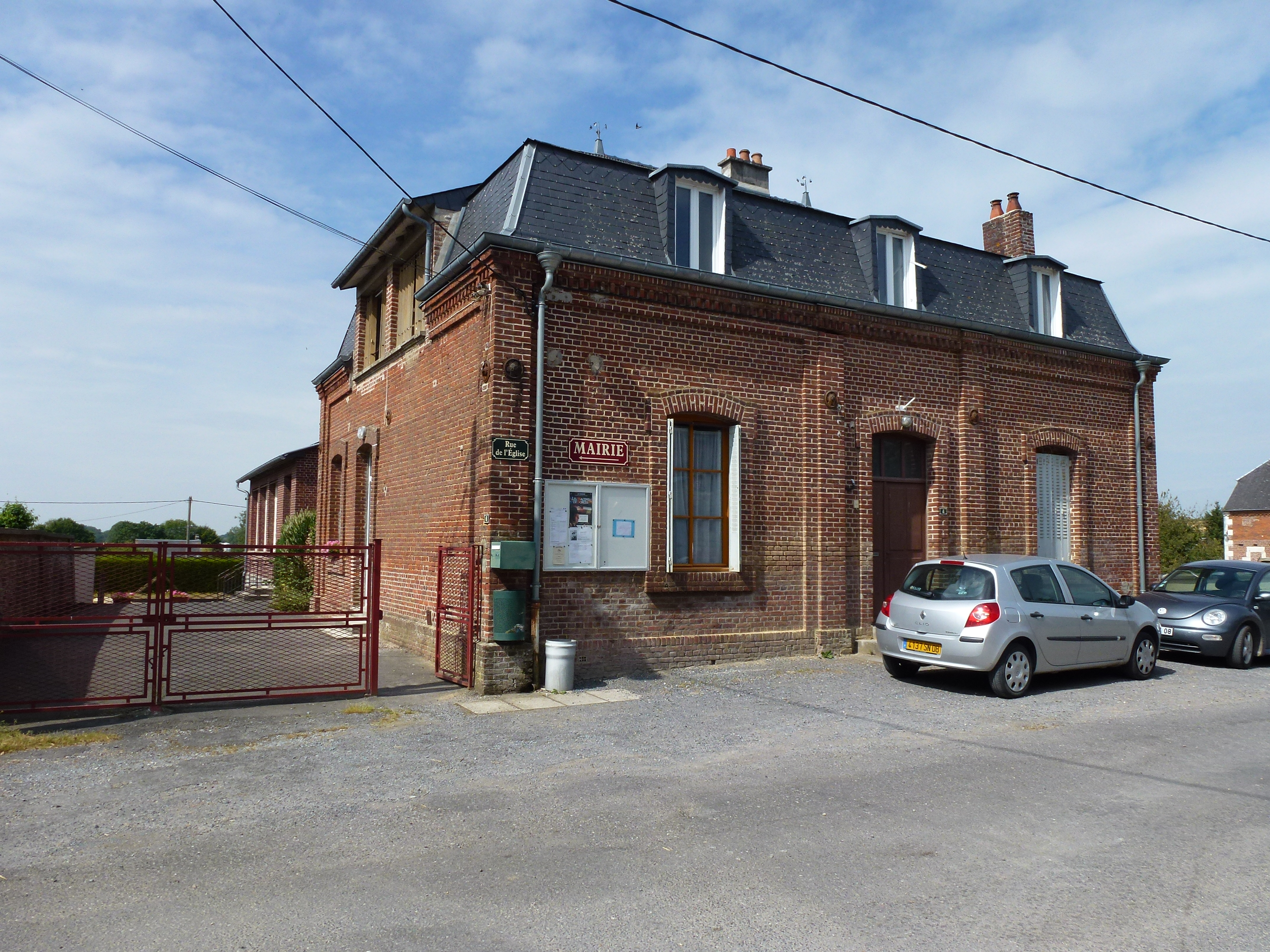
- The town hall in Fraillicourt
- Location of Fraillicourt
- Location within France Location within Grand Est
- Coordinates: 49°40′02″N 4°09′49″E
- Country: France
- Region: Grand Est
- Department: Ardennes
- Arrondissement: Rethel
- Canton: Signy-l'Abbaye
- Intercommunality: Crêtes Préardennaises

Government
  - Mayor (2020–2026): Catherine Vicet
- Area^{1}: 14.39 km^{2} (5.56 sq mi)
- Elevation: 142 m (466 ft)
- Population (2023): 164
  - Density: 11.4/km^{2} (29.5/sq mi)
- Time zone: UTC+01:00 (CET)
  - Summer (DST): UTC+02:00 (CEST)
- INSEE/Postal code: 08178 /08220
- ^{1} French Land Register data, which excludes lakes, ponds, glaciers > 1 km^{2} (0.386 sq mi or 247 acres) and river estuaries.

Fraillicourt (French pronunciation: [fʁajikuʁ]) is a commune in the Ardennes department in northern France.

== Population ==
Historical population
Year	Pop.	±% p.a.
1968	300	—
1975	257	−2.19%
1982	226	−1.82%
1990	212	−0.80%
1999	204	−0.43%
2007	219	+0.89%
2012	192	−2.60%
2017	189	−0.31%
2023	164	−2.34%
Source: INSEE

== See also ==
- Communes of the Ardennes department
