= Cernion =

- Commune
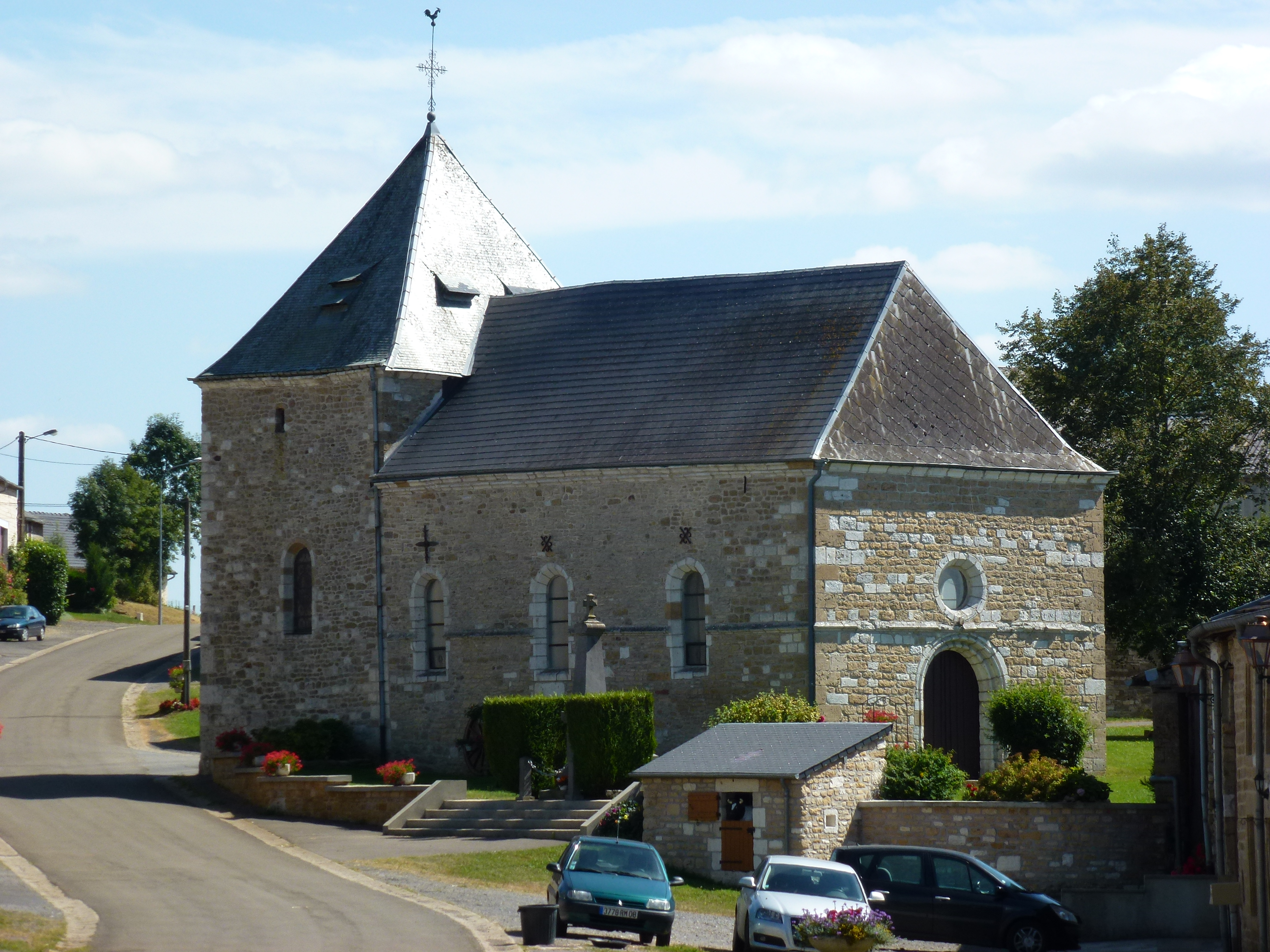
- The church in Cernion

- Coat of arms
- Location of Cernion
- Location within France Location within Grand Est
- Coordinates: 49°47′54″N 4°25′53″E
- Country: France
- Region: Grand Est
- Department: Ardennes
- Arrondissement: Charleville-Mézières
- Canton: Signy-l'Abbaye
- Intercommunality: Ardennes Thiérache

Government
  - Mayor (2020–2026): Patricia Felix
- Area^{1}: 6.58 km^{2} (2.54 sq mi)
- Elevation: 285 m (935 ft)
- Population (2023): 54
  - Density: 8.2/km^{2} (21/sq mi)
- Time zone: UTC+01:00 (CET)
  - Summer (DST): UTC+02:00 (CEST)
- INSEE/Postal code: 08094 /08260
- ^{1} French Land Register data, which excludes lakes, ponds, glaciers > 1 km^{2} (0.386 sq mi or 247 acres) and river estuaries.

Cernion is a commune in the Ardennes department in northern France.

== Population ==
Historical population
Year	Pop.	±% p.a.
1968	56	—
1975	58	+0.50%
1982	55	−0.76%
1990	51	−0.94%
1999	46	−1.14%
2007	53	+1.79%
2012	61	+2.85%
2017	58	−1.00%
2023	54	−1.18%
Source: INSEE

== See also ==
- Communes of the Ardennes department
