= Draize =

- Commune
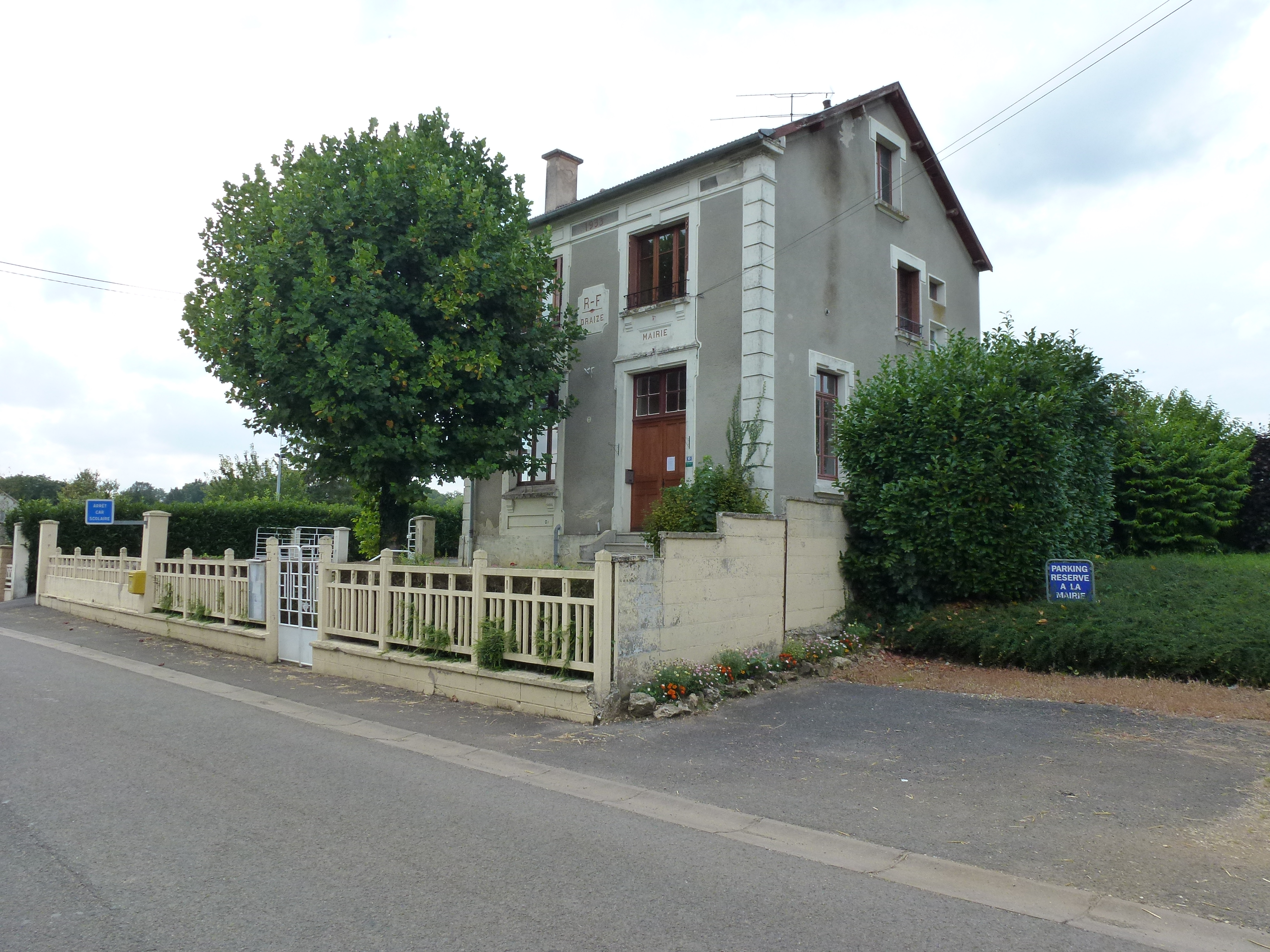
- The town hall in Draize
- Location of Draize
- Location within France Location within Grand Est
- Coordinates: 49°39′29″N 4°20′09″E
- Country: France
- Region: Grand Est
- Department: Ardennes
- Arrondissement: Rethel
- Canton: Signy-l'Abbaye
- Intercommunality: Crêtes Préardennaises

Government
  - Mayor (2020–2026): Marinette Manceaux
- Area^{1}: 6.79 km^{2} (2.62 sq mi)
- Elevation: 130 m (430 ft)
- Population (2023): 89
  - Density: 13/km^{2} (34/sq mi)
- Time zone: UTC+01:00 (CET)
  - Summer (DST): UTC+02:00 (CEST)
- INSEE/Postal code: 08146 /08220
- ^{1} French Land Register data, which excludes lakes, ponds, glaciers > 1 km^{2} (0.386 sq mi or 247 acres) and river estuaries.

Draize (French pronunciation: [dʁɛz]) is a commune in the Ardennes department in northern France.

== Population ==
Historical population
Year	Pop.	±% p.a.
1968	149	—
1975	115	−3.63%
1982	118	+0.37%
1990	117	−0.11%
1999	100	−1.73%
2007	102	+0.25%
2012	101	−0.20%
2017	103	+0.39%
2023	89	−2.41%
Source: INSEE

== See also ==
- Communes of the Ardennes department
