= Neufmaison =

- Commune
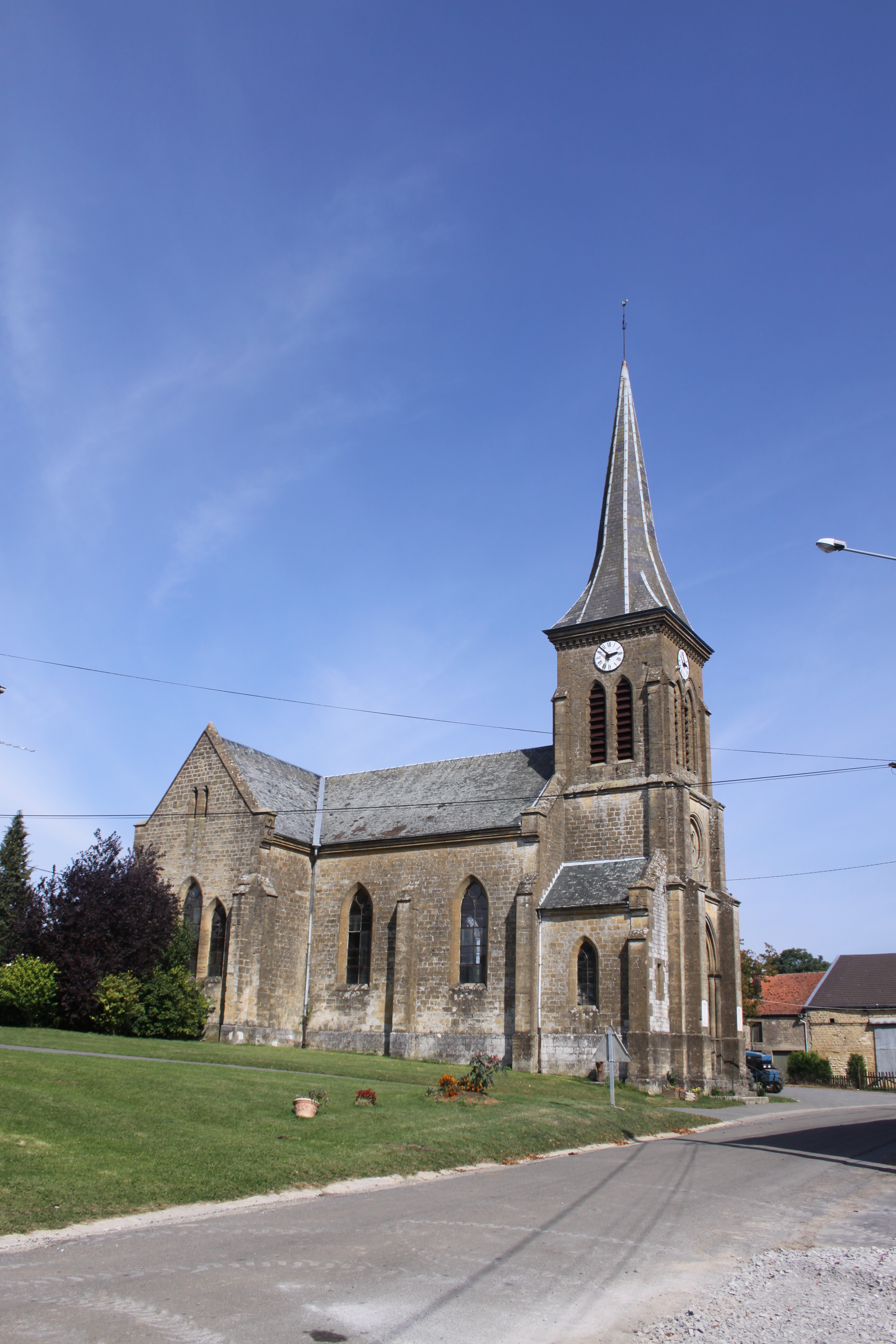
- The church in Neufmaison
- Location of Neufmaison
- Location within France Location within Grand Est
- Coordinates: 49°45′43″N 4°30′35″E
- Country: France
- Region: Grand Est
- Department: Ardennes
- Arrondissement: Charleville-Mézières
- Canton: Signy-l'Abbaye
- Intercommunality: Crêtes Préardennaises

Government
  - Mayor (2020–2026): Justin Demely
- Area^{1}: 7.06 km^{2} (2.73 sq mi)
- Elevation: 285 m (935 ft)
- Population (2023): 65
  - Density: 9.2/km^{2} (24/sq mi)
- Time zone: UTC+01:00 (CET)
  - Summer (DST): UTC+02:00 (CEST)
- INSEE/Postal code: 08315 /08460
- ^{1} French Land Register data, which excludes lakes, ponds, glaciers > 1 km^{2} (0.386 sq mi or 247 acres) and river estuaries.

Neufmaison is a commune in the Ardennes department in northern France.

== Population ==
Historical population
Year	Pop.	±% p.a.
1968	77	—
1975	67	−1.97%
1982	57	−2.28%
1990	50	−1.62%
1999	61	+2.23%
2007	60	−0.21%
2012	60	+0.00%
2017	69	+2.83%
2023	65	−0.99%
Source: INSEE

== See also ==
- Communes of the Ardennes department
