= Estrebay =

- Commune
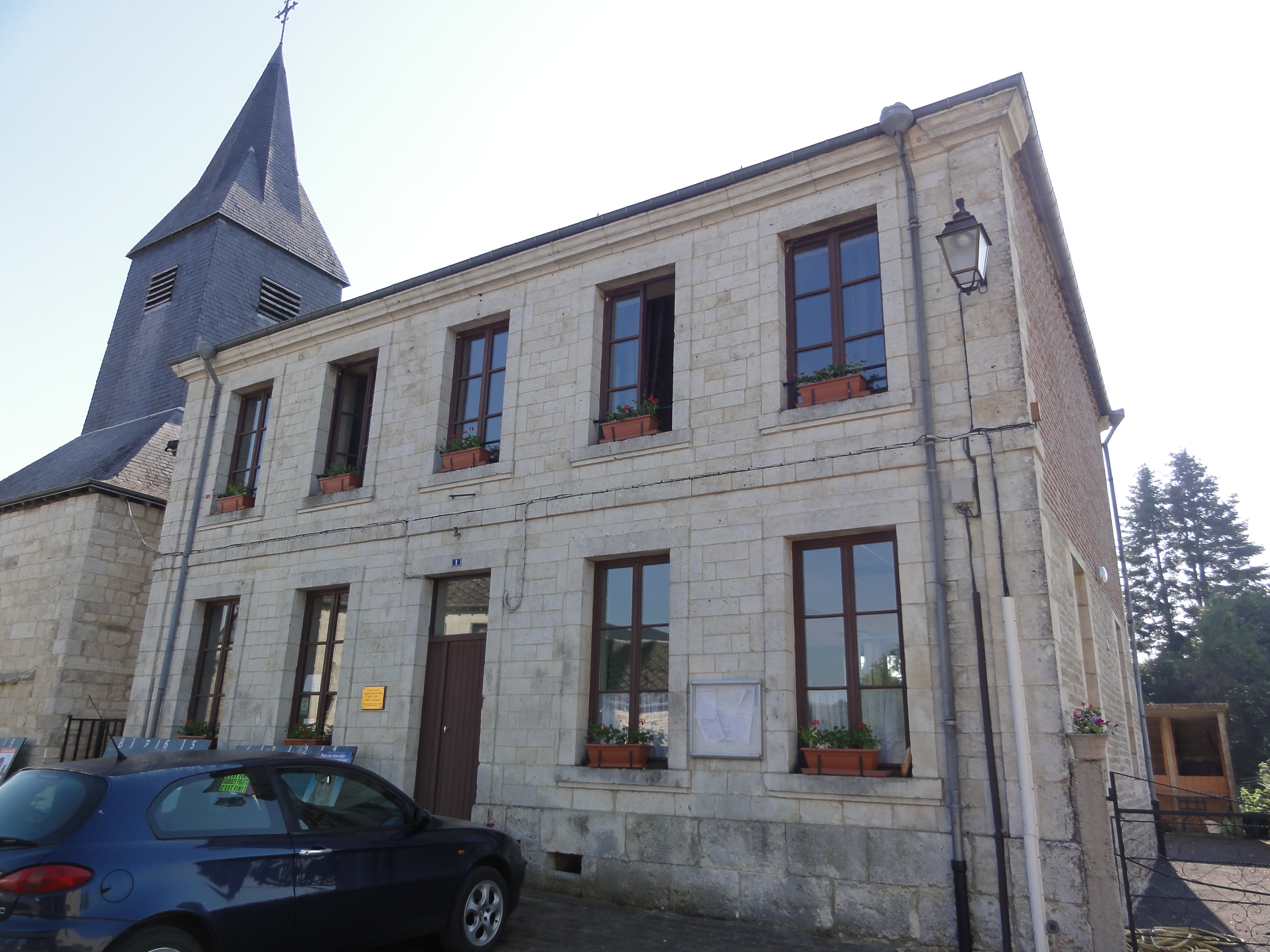
- Town hall

- Coat of arms
- Location of Estrebay
- Location within France Location within Grand Est
- Coordinates: 49°49′49″N 4°21′21″E
- Country: France
- Region: Grand Est
- Department: Ardennes
- Arrondissement: Charleville-Mézières
- Canton: Signy-l'Abbaye
- Intercommunality: Ardennes Thiérache

Government
  - Mayor (2020–2026): Mireille Blain
- Area^{1}: 9.37 km^{2} (3.62 sq mi)
- Elevation: 265 m (869 ft)
- Population (2023): 84
  - Density: 9.0/km^{2} (23/sq mi)
- Time zone: UTC+01:00 (CET)
  - Summer (DST): UTC+02:00 (CEST)
- INSEE/Postal code: 08154 /08260
- ^{1} French Land Register data, which excludes lakes, ponds, glaciers > 1 km^{2} (0.386 sq mi or 247 acres) and river estuaries.

Estrebay is a commune in the Ardennes department in northern France.

== Population ==
Historical population
Year	Pop.	±% p.a.
1968	130	—
1975	98	−3.96%
1982	81	−2.68%
1990	66	−2.53%
1999	69	+0.50%
2007	84	+2.49%
2012	72	−3.04%
2017	74	+0.55%
2023	84	+2.14%
Source: INSEE

== See also ==
- Communes of the Ardennes department
