= Justine-Herbigny =

- Commune
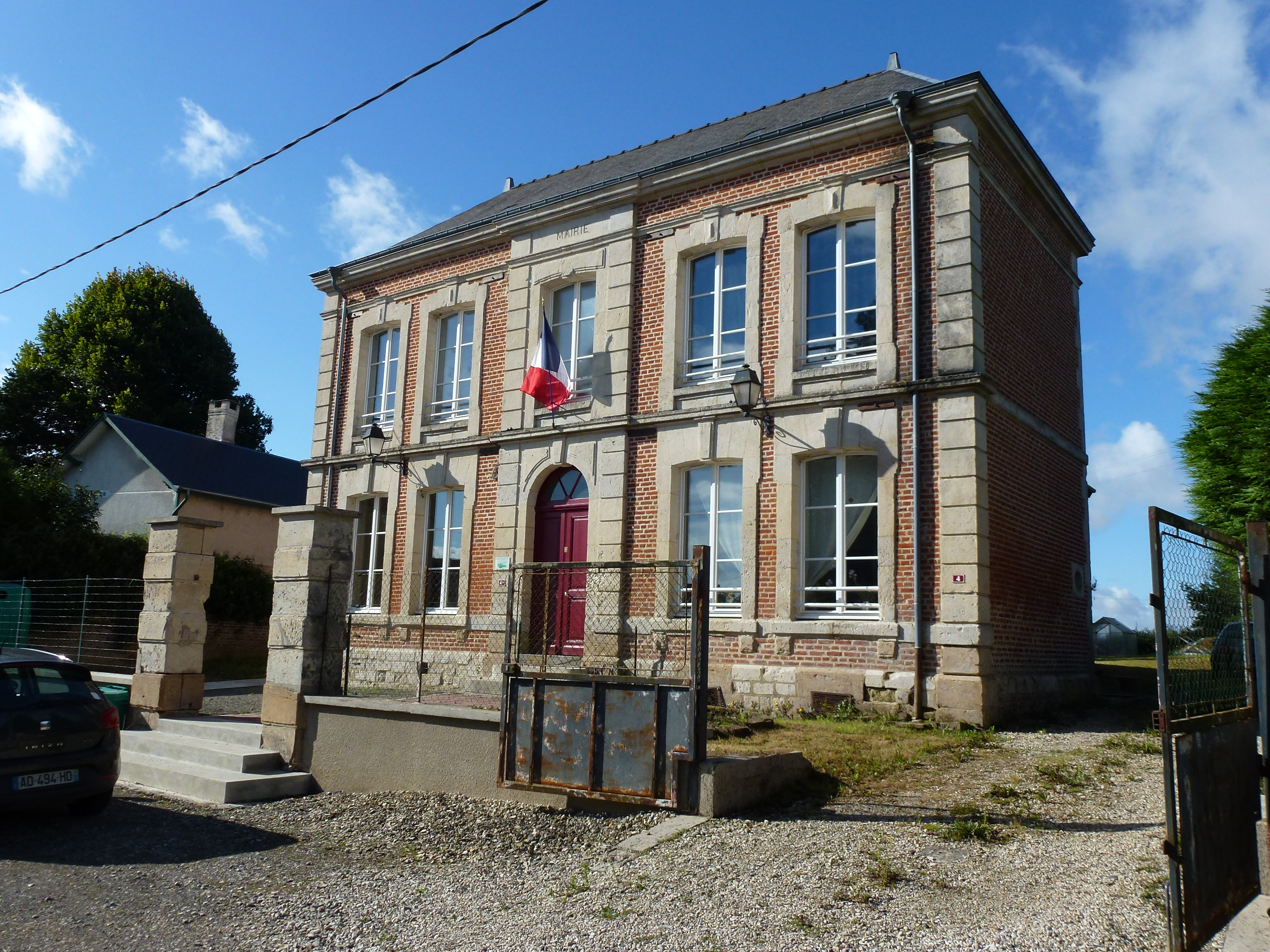
- The town hall in Justine-Herbigny
- Location of Justine-Herbigny
- Location within France Location within Grand Est
- Coordinates: 49°35′54″N 4°19′33″E
- Country: France
- Region: Grand Est
- Department: Ardennes
- Arrondissement: Rethel
- Canton: Signy-l'Abbaye
- Intercommunality: Crêtes Préardennaises

Government
  - Mayor (2020–2026): Brice Hubert
- Area^{1}: 11.77 km^{2} (4.54 sq mi)
- Elevation: 90 m (300 ft)
- Highest elevation: 179 m (587 ft)
- Lowest elevation: 79 m (259 ft)
- Population (2023): 161
  - Density: 13.7/km^{2} (35.4/sq mi)
- Time zone: UTC+01:00 (CET)
  - Summer (DST): UTC+02:00 (CEST)
- INSEE/Postal code: 08240 /08270
- ^{1} French Land Register data, which excludes lakes, ponds, glaciers > 1 km^{2} (0.386 sq mi or 247 acres) and river estuaries.

Justine-Herbigny (French pronunciation: [ʒystin ɛʁbiɲi]) is a commune in the Ardennes department in northern France. The commune was formed in 1965 by the merger of the former communes Justine and Herbigny.

== Population ==
Historical population
Year	Pop.	±% p.a.
1968	199	—
1975	169	−2.31%
1982	159	−0.87%
1990	135	−2.02%
1999	114	−1.86%
2007	166	+4.81%
2012	168	+0.24%
2017	175	+0.82%
2023	161	−1.38%
Source: INSEE

== See also ==
- Communes of the Ardennes department
