= Bossus-lès-Rumigny =

- Commune
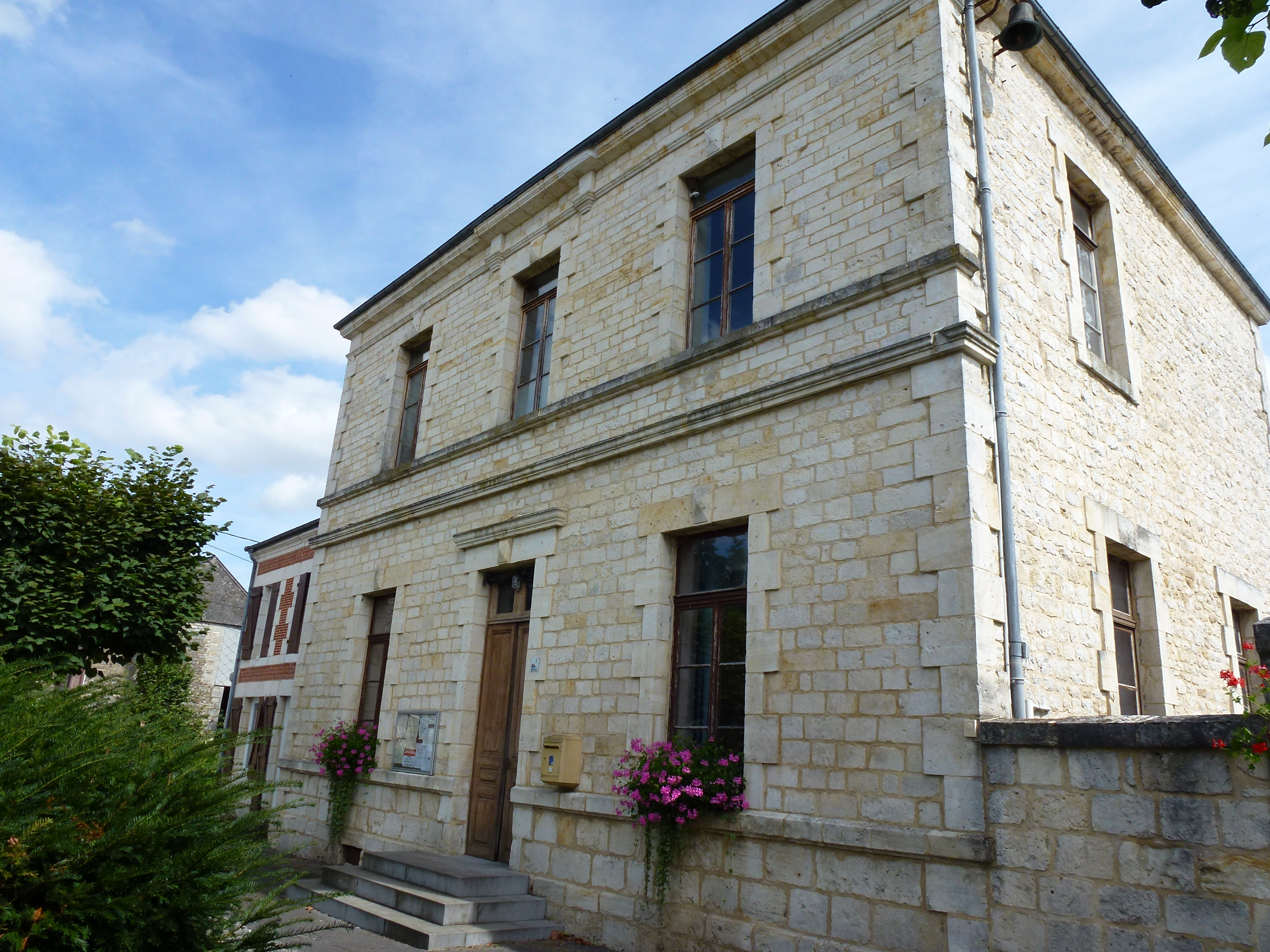
- Town hall

- Coat of arms
- Location of Bossus-lès-Rumigny
- Location within France Location within Grand Est
- Coordinates: 49°50′22″N 4°15′27″E
- Country: France
- Region: Grand Est
- Department: Ardennes
- Arrondissement: Charleville-Mézières
- Canton: Signy-l'Abbaye
- Intercommunality: Ardennes Thiérache

Government
  - Mayor (2020–2026): Patrice Champion
- Area^{1}: 8.14 km^{2} (3.14 sq mi)
- Elevation: 200 m (660 ft)
- Highest elevation: 241 m (791 ft)
- Lowest elevation: 178 m (584 ft)
- Population (2023): 94
  - Density: 12/km^{2} (30/sq mi)
- Time zone: UTC+01:00 (CET)
  - Summer (DST): UTC+02:00 (CEST)
- INSEE/Postal code: 08073 /08290
- ^{1} French Land Register data, which excludes lakes, ponds, glaciers > 1 km^{2} (0.386 sq mi or 247 acres) and river estuaries.

Bossus-lès-Rumigny is a commune in the Ardennes department in northern France.

== Population ==
Historical population
Year	Pop.	±% p.a.
1968	144	—
1975	134	−1.02%
1982	134	+0.00%
1990	136	+0.19%
1999	94	−4.02%
2007	89	−0.68%
2012	101	+2.56%
2017	103	+0.39%
2023	94	−1.51%
Source: INSEE

== See also ==
- Communes of the Ardennes department
