= Vaux-Villaine =

- Commune
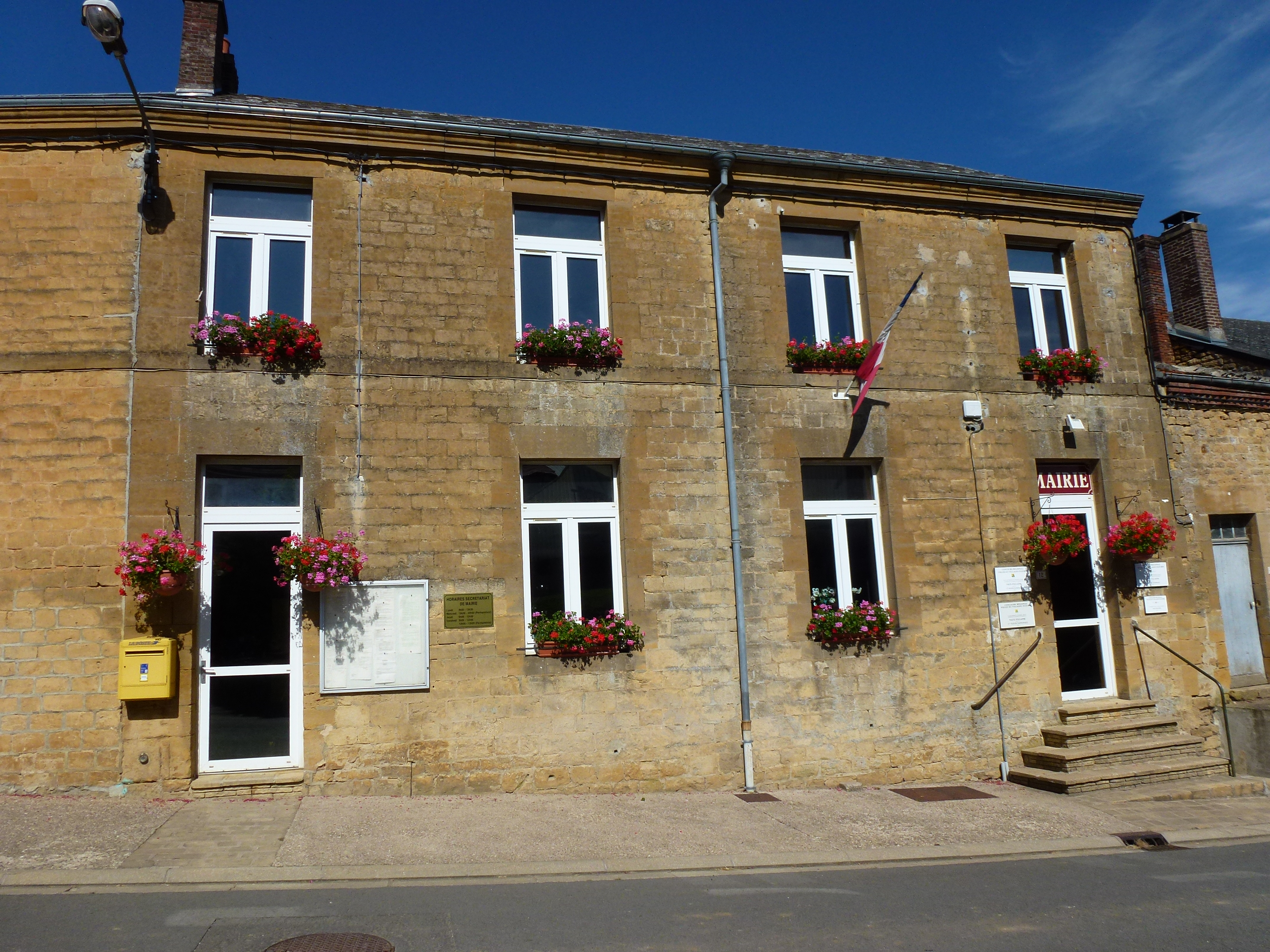
- The town hall in Vaux-Villaine

- Coat of arms
- Location of Vaux-Villaine
- Location within France Location within Grand Est
- Coordinates: 49°46′17″N 4°28′23″E
- Country: France
- Region: Grand Est
- Department: Ardennes
- Arrondissement: Charleville-Mézières
- Canton: Signy-l'Abbaye

Government
  - Mayor (2020–2026): Jean-Marc Rousseaux
- Area^{1}: 9.96 km^{2} (3.85 sq mi)
- Elevation: 198 m (650 ft)
- Population (2023): 186
  - Density: 18.7/km^{2} (48.4/sq mi)
- Time zone: UTC+01:00 (CET)
  - Summer (DST): UTC+02:00 (CEST)
- INSEE/Postal code: 08468 /08150
- ^{1} French Land Register data, which excludes lakes, ponds, glaciers > 1 km^{2} (0.386 sq mi or 247 acres) and river estuaries.

Vaux-Villaine is a commune in the Ardennes department in northern France.

== Population ==
Historical population
Year	Pop.	±% p.a.
1968	139	—
1975	147	+0.80%
1982	145	−0.20%
1990	160	+1.24%
1999	186	+1.69%
2007	182	−0.27%
2012	197	+1.60%
2017	195	−0.20%
2023	186	−0.78%
Source: INSEE

== See also ==
- Communes of the Ardennes department
