= Sorcy-Bauthémont =

- Commune
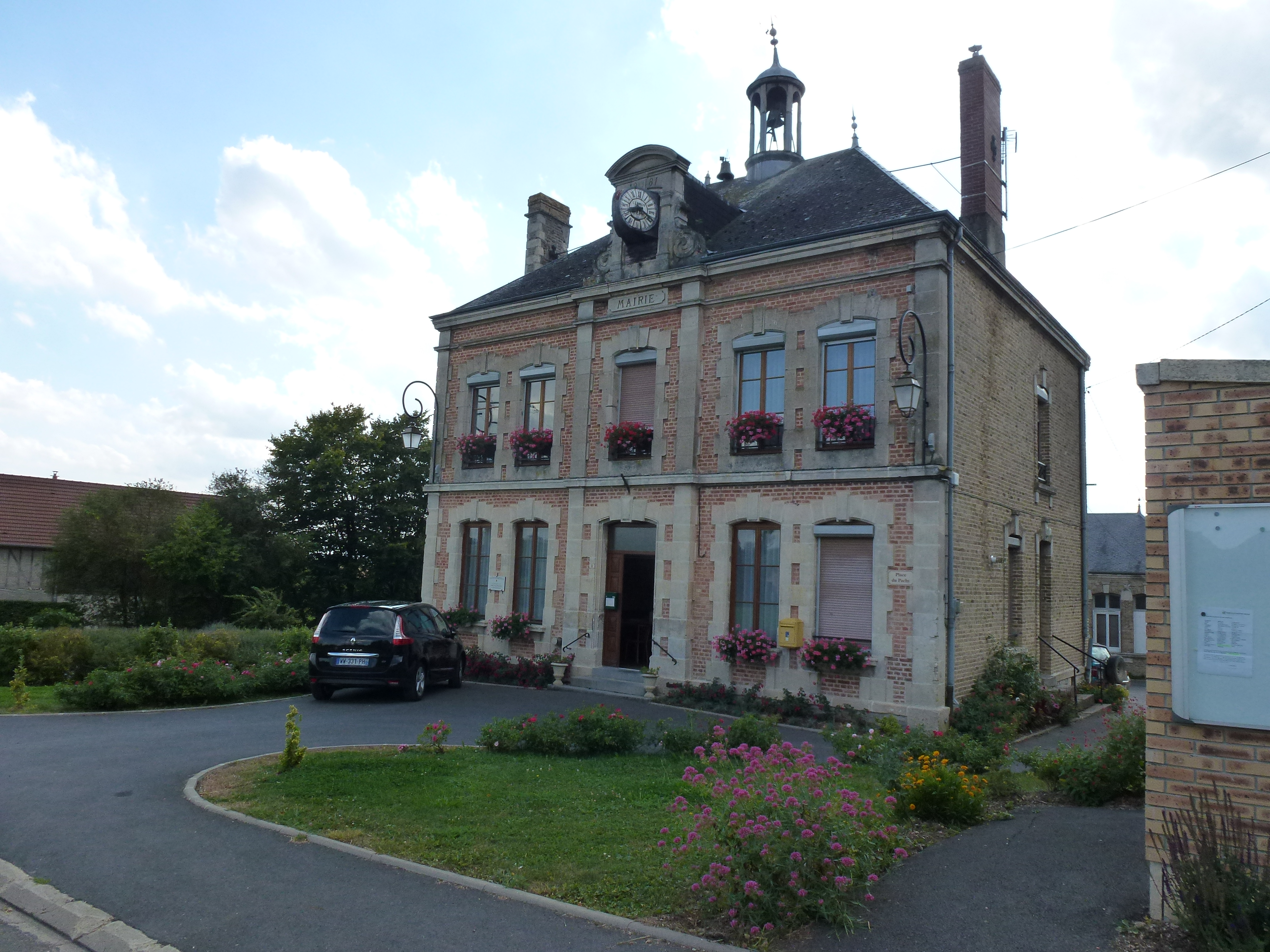
- Town hall
- Location of Sorcy-Bauthémont
- Location within France Location within Grand Est
- Coordinates: 49°32′19″N 4°32′12″E
- Country: France
- Region: Grand Est
- Department: Ardennes
- Arrondissement: Rethel
- Canton: Signy-l'Abbaye
- Intercommunality: Crêtes Préardennaises

Government
  - Mayor (2022–2026): Marion Canat
- Area^{1}: 11.14 km^{2} (4.30 sq mi)
- Elevation: 100 m (330 ft)
- Highest elevation: 151 m (495 ft)
- Lowest elevation: 82 m (269 ft)
- Population (2023): 146
  - Density: 13.1/km^{2} (33.9/sq mi)
- Time zone: UTC+01:00 (CET)
  - Summer (DST): UTC+02:00 (CEST)
- INSEE/Postal code: 08428 /08270
- ^{1} French Land Register data, which excludes lakes, ponds, glaciers > 1 km^{2} (0.386 sq mi or 247 acres) and river estuaries.

Sorcy-Bauthémont (French pronunciation: [sɔʁsi botemɔ̃]) is a commune in the Ardennes department in northern France.

== Population ==
Historical population
Year	Pop.	±% p.a.
1968	169	—
1975	152	−1.50%
1982	124	−2.87%
1990	127	+0.30%
1999	139	+1.01%
2007	140	+0.09%
2012	144	+0.57%
2017	151	+0.95%
2023	146	−0.56%
Source: INSEE

== See also ==
- Communes of the Ardennes department
