= Montmeillant =

- Commune
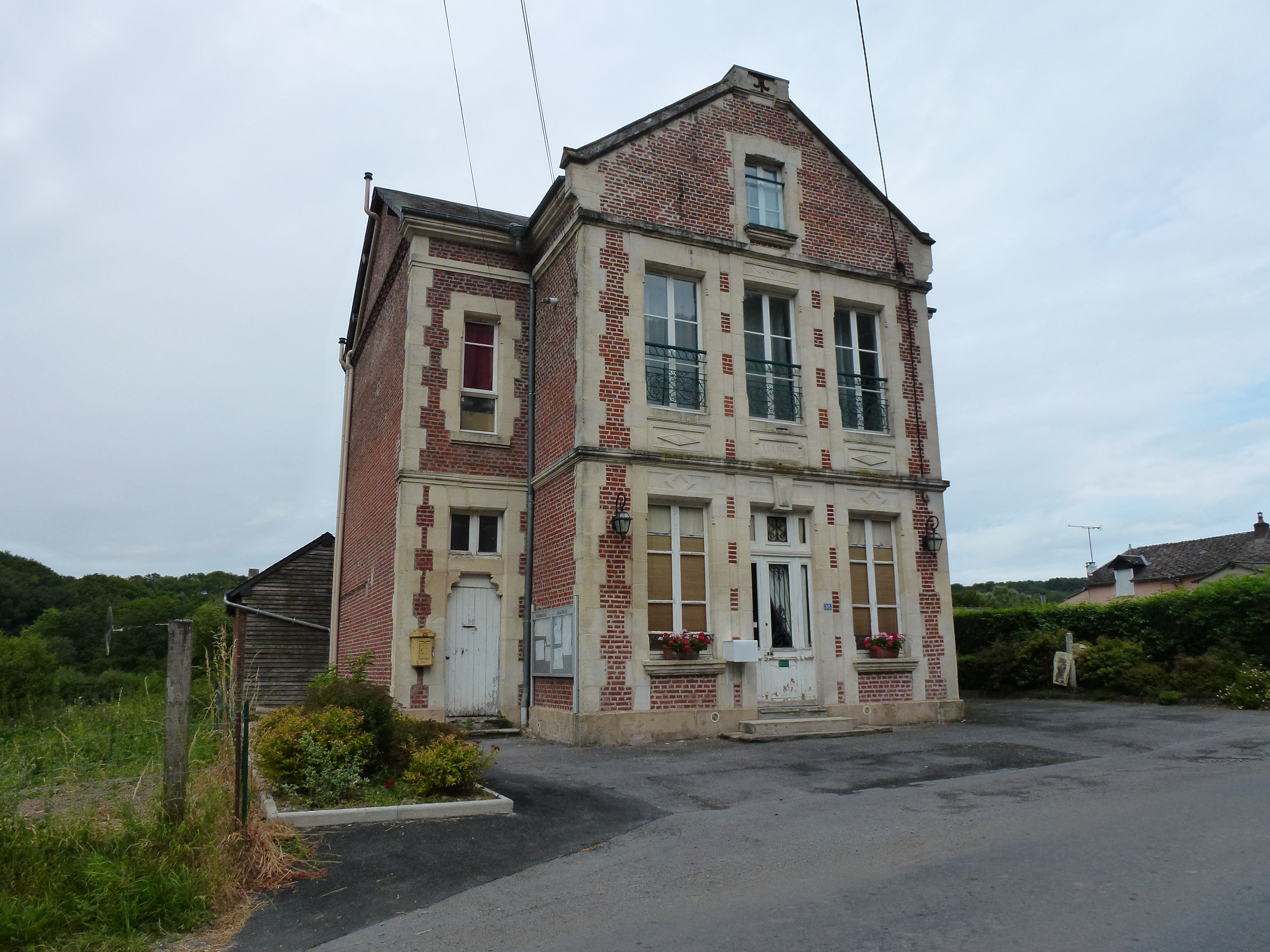
- Town hall
- Location of Montmeillant
- Location within France Location within Grand Est
- Coordinates: 49°41′35″N 4°19′52″E
- Country: France
- Region: Grand Est
- Department: Ardennes
- Arrondissement: Rethel
- Canton: Signy-l'Abbaye
- Intercommunality: Crêtes Préardennaises

Government
  - Mayor (2020–2026): Raphaël Lacaille
- Area^{1}: 7.02 km^{2} (2.71 sq mi)
- Elevation: 204 m (669 ft)
- Population (2023): 78
  - Density: 11/km^{2} (29/sq mi)
- Time zone: UTC+01:00 (CET)
  - Summer (DST): UTC+02:00 (CEST)
- INSEE/Postal code: 08307 /08220
- ^{1} French Land Register data, which excludes lakes, ponds, glaciers > 1 km^{2} (0.386 sq mi or 247 acres) and river estuaries.

Montmeillant (French pronunciation: [mɔ̃mɛjɑ̃]) is a commune in the Ardennes department in northern France.

== Population ==
Historical population
| Year | Pop. | ±% p.a. |
|---|---|---|
| 1968 | 122 | — |
| 1975 | 105 | −2.12% |
| 1982 | 82 | −3.47% |
| 1990 | 87 | +0.74% |
| 1999 | 84 | −0.39% |
| 2007 | 99 | +2.08% |
| 2012 | 89 | −2.11% |
| 2017 | 83 | −1.39% |
| 2023 | 78 | −1.03% |
Source: INSEE

== See also ==
- Communes of the Ardennes department
