= Hagnicourt =

- Commune
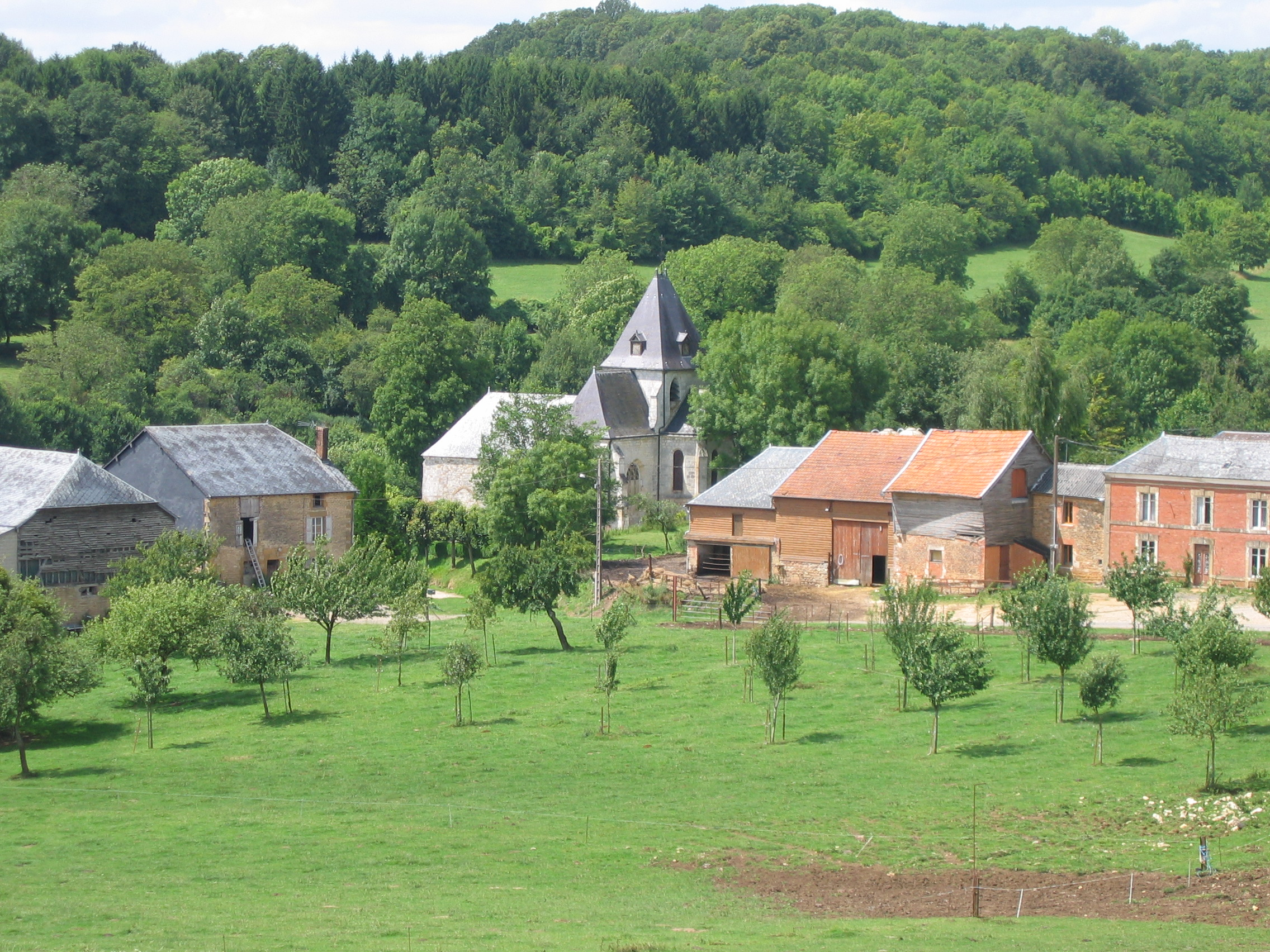
- The church and surroundings in Hagnicourt

- Coat of arms
- Location of Hagnicourt
- Location within France Location within Grand Est
- Coordinates: 49°36′34″N 4°35′09″E
- Country: France
- Region: Grand Est
- Department: Ardennes
- Arrondissement: Rethel
- Canton: Signy-l'Abbaye
- Intercommunality: Crêtes Préardennaises

Government
  - Mayor (2020–2026): Olivier Lambert
- Area^{1}: 5.75 km^{2} (2.22 sq mi)
- Elevation: 234 m (768 ft)
- Population (2023): 67
  - Density: 12/km^{2} (30/sq mi)
- Time zone: UTC+01:00 (CET)
  - Summer (DST): UTC+02:00 (CEST)
- INSEE/Postal code: 08205 /08430
- ^{1} French Land Register data, which excludes lakes, ponds, glaciers > 1 km^{2} (0.386 sq mi or 247 acres) and river estuaries.

Hagnicourt (French pronunciation: [aɲikuʁ]) is a commune in the Ardennes department and Grand Est region of north-eastern France.

== Population ==
Historical population
Year	Pop.	±% p.a.
1968	82	—
1975	69	−2.44%
1982	72	+0.61%
1990	59	−2.46%
1999	64	+0.91%
2007	59	−1.01%
2012	76	+5.19%
2017	80	+1.03%
2023	67	−2.91%
Source: INSEE

== See also ==
- Communes of the Ardennes department
