= Givron =

- Commune
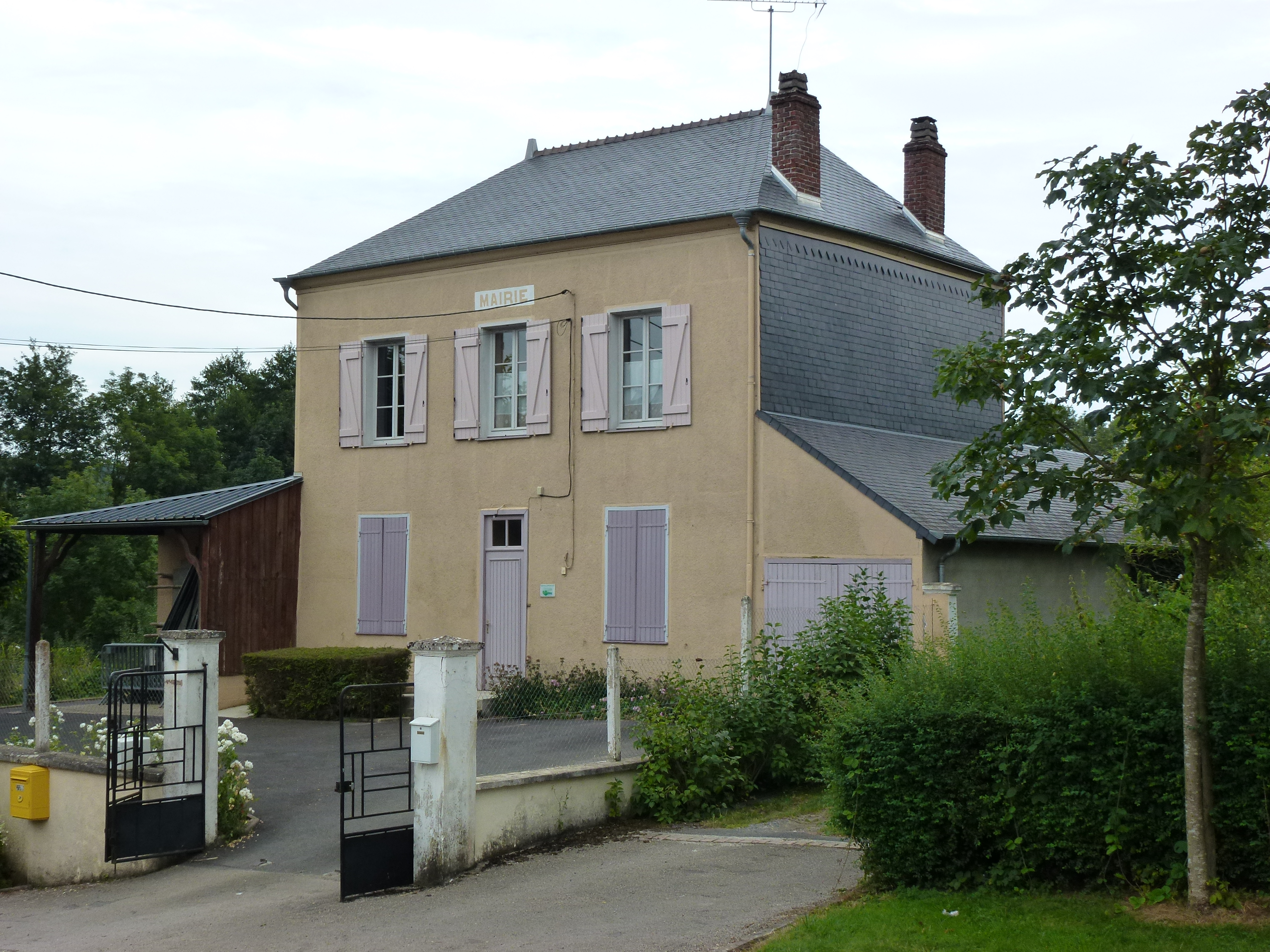
- Town hall
- Location of Givron
- Location within France Location within Grand Est
- Coordinates: 49°38′57″N 4°17′27″E
- Country: France
- Region: Grand Est
- Department: Ardennes
- Arrondissement: Rethel
- Canton: Signy-l'Abbaye
- Intercommunality: Crêtes Préardennaises

Government
  - Mayor (2020–2026): Gilles Duant
- Area^{1}: 7.15 km^{2} (2.76 sq mi)
- Elevation: 115 m (377 ft)
- Population (2023): 95
  - Density: 13/km^{2} (34/sq mi)
- Time zone: UTC+01:00 (CET)
  - Summer (DST): UTC+02:00 (CEST)
- INSEE/Postal code: 08192 /08220
- ^{1} French Land Register data, which excludes lakes, ponds, glaciers > 1 km^{2} (0.386 sq mi or 247 acres) and river estuaries.

Givron (French pronunciation: [ʒivʁɔ̃]) is a commune in the Ardennes department in northern France.

== Population ==
Historical population
Year	Pop.	±% p.a.
1968	119	—
1975	95	−3.17%
1982	99	+0.59%
1990	95	−0.51%
1999	85	−1.23%
2007	74	−1.72%
2012	98	+5.78%
2017	86	−2.58%
2023	95	+1.67%
Source: INSEE

== See also ==
- Communes of the Ardennes department
