= Maranwez =

- Commune
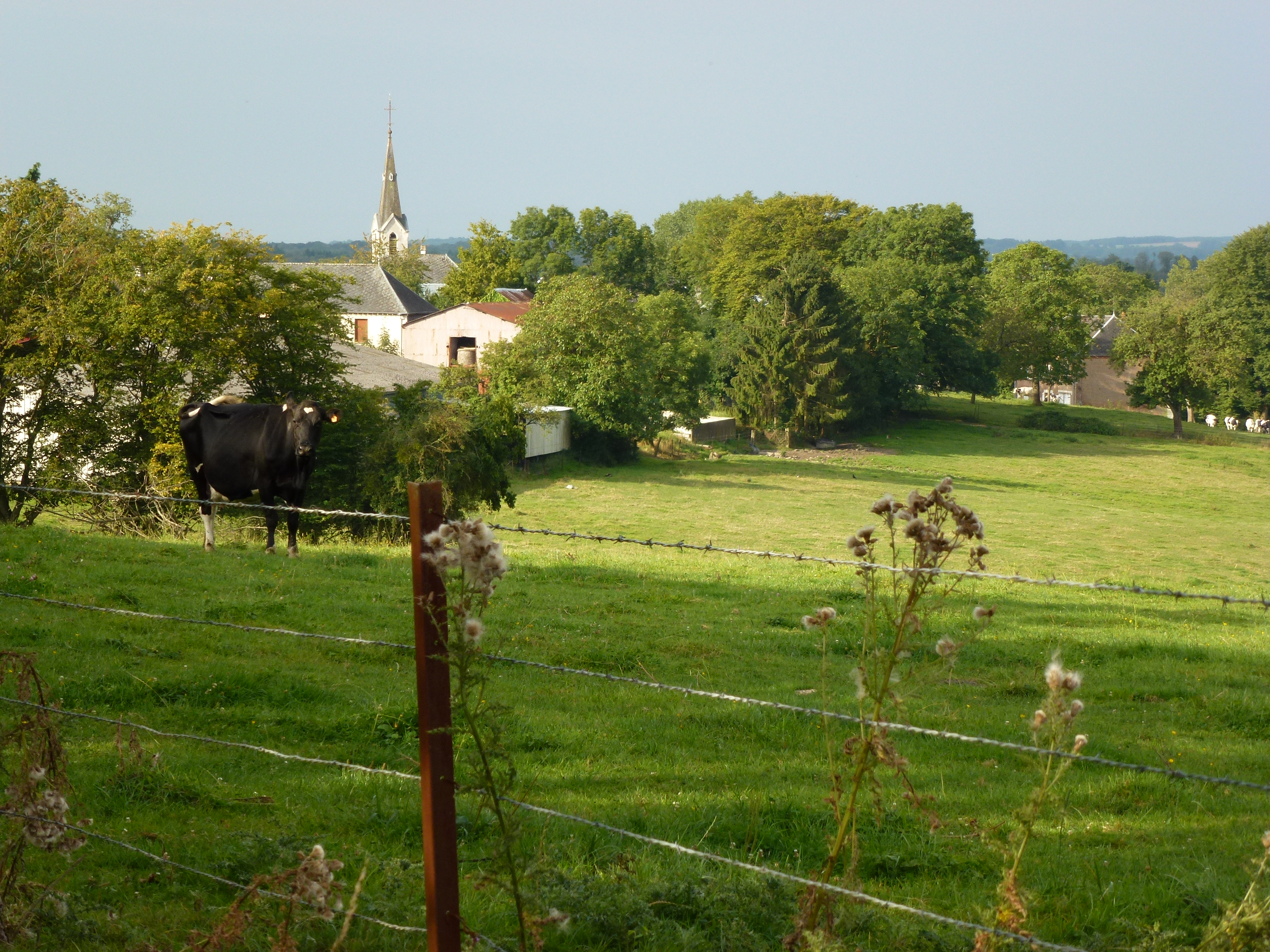
- A general view of Maranwez

- Coat of arms
- Location of Maranwez
- Location within France Location within Grand Est
- Coordinates: 49°43′47″N 4°20′36″E
- Country: France
- Region: Grand Est
- Department: Ardennes
- Arrondissement: Charleville-Mézières
- Canton: Signy-l'Abbaye
- Intercommunality: Crêtes Préardennaises

Government
  - Mayor (2020–2026): Romain Bos
- Area^{1}: 3.03 km^{2} (1.17 sq mi)
- Elevation: 220 m (720 ft)
- Population (2023): 55
  - Density: 18/km^{2} (47/sq mi)
- Time zone: UTC+01:00 (CET)
  - Summer (DST): UTC+02:00 (CEST)
- INSEE/Postal code: 08272 /08460
- ^{1} French Land Register data, which excludes lakes, ponds, glaciers > 1 km^{2} (0.386 sq mi or 247 acres) and river estuaries.

Maranwez (French pronunciation: [maʁɑ̃ve]) is a commune in the Ardennes department in northern France.

== Population ==
Historical population
Year	Pop.	±% p.a.
1968	84	—
1975	65	−3.60%
1982	51	−3.41%
1990	57	+1.40%
1999	59	+0.38%
2007	56	−0.65%
2012	50	−2.24%
2017	61	+4.06%
2023	55	−1.71%
Source: INSEE

== See also ==
- Communes of the Ardennes department
