= Doumely-Bégny =

- Commune
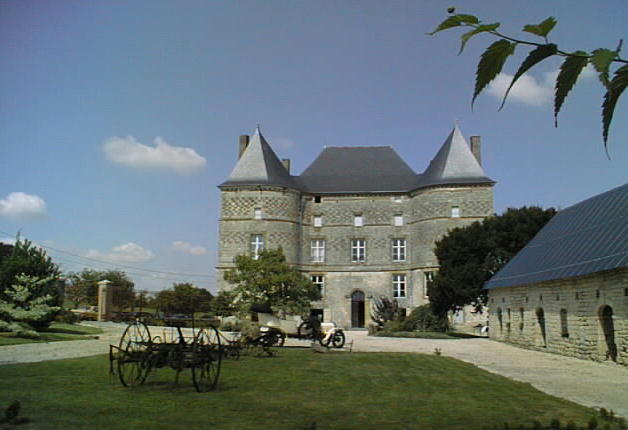
- The chateau in Doumely
- Location of Doumely-Bégny
- Location within France Location within Grand Est
- Coordinates: 49°37′46″N 4°18′04″E
- Country: France
- Region: Grand Est
- Department: Ardennes
- Arrondissement: Rethel
- Canton: Signy-l'Abbaye
- Intercommunality: Crêtes Préardennaises

Government
  - Mayor (2020–2026): Alain Masseau
- Area^{1}: 7.8 km^{2} (3.0 sq mi)
- Elevation: 104 m (341 ft)
- Population (2023): 83
  - Density: 11/km^{2} (28/sq mi)
- Time zone: UTC+01:00 (CET)
  - Summer (DST): UTC+02:00 (CEST)
- INSEE/Postal code: 08143 /08220
- ^{1} French Land Register data, which excludes lakes, ponds, glaciers > 1 km^{2} (0.386 sq mi or 247 acres) and river estuaries.

Doumely-Bégny (French pronunciation: [dumli beɲi]) is a commune in the Ardennes department in northern France.

== Population ==
Historical population
Year	Pop.	±% p.a.
1968	138	—
1975	81	−7.33%
1982	78	−0.54%
1990	77	−0.16%
1999	86	+1.24%
2007	95	+1.25%
2012	90	−1.08%
2017	76	−3.32%
2023	83	+1.48%
Source: INSEE

== See also ==
- Communes of the Ardennes department
