= Wignicourt =

- Commune
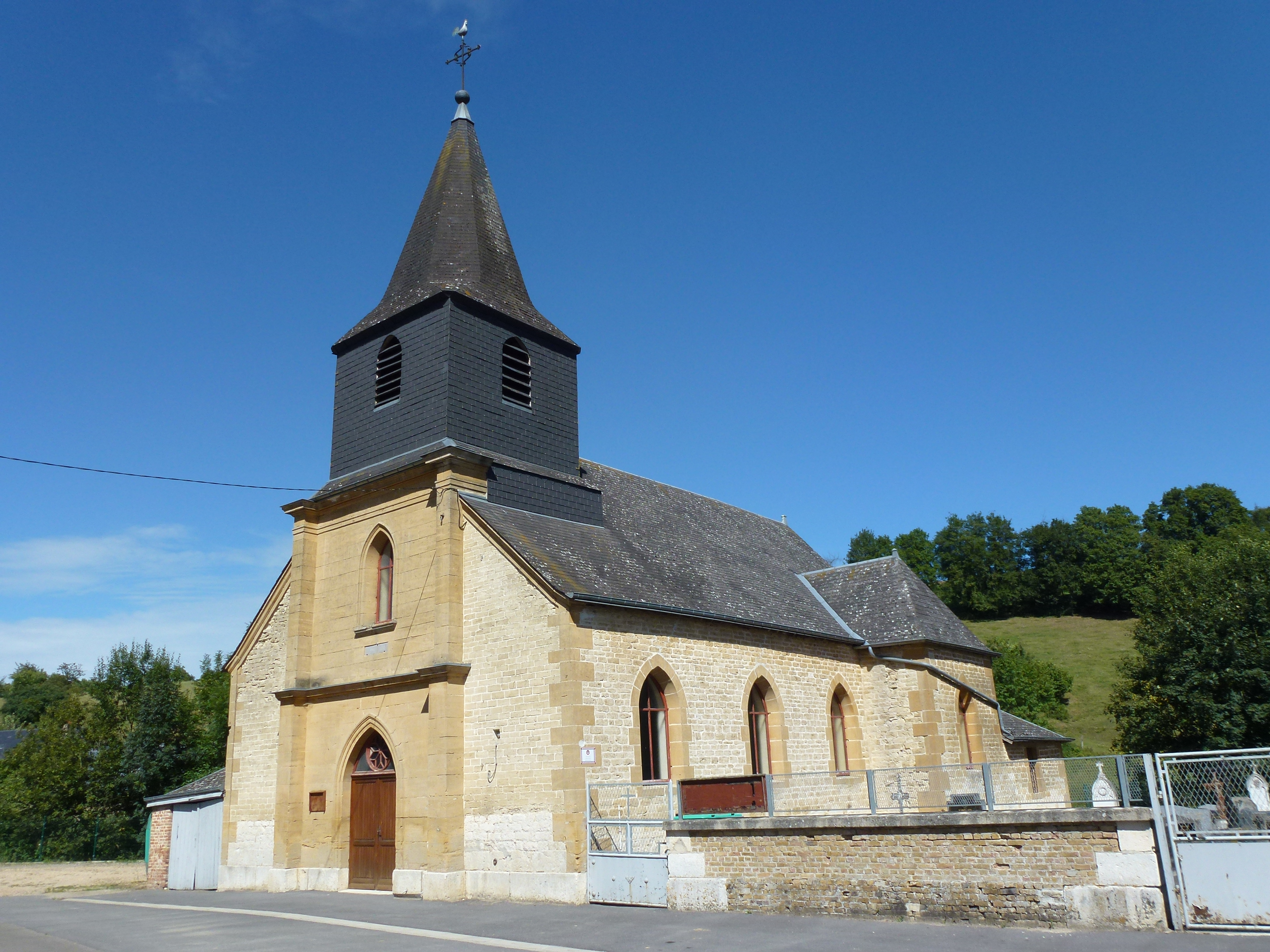
- The church in Wignicourt
- Location of Wignicourt
- Location within France Location within Grand Est
- Coordinates: 49°34′44″N 4°34′46″E
- Country: France
- Region: Grand Est
- Department: Ardennes
- Arrondissement: Rethel
- Canton: Signy-l'Abbaye
- Intercommunality: Crêtes Préardennaises

Government
  - Mayor (2022–2026): Matthieu Lamoureux
- Area^{1}: 4.49 km^{2} (1.73 sq mi)
- Elevation: 145 m (476 ft)
- Population (2023): 57
  - Density: 13/km^{2} (33/sq mi)
- Time zone: UTC+01:00 (CET)
  - Summer (DST): UTC+02:00 (CEST)
- INSEE/Postal code: 08500 /08270
- ^{1} French Land Register data, which excludes lakes, ponds, glaciers > 1 km^{2} (0.386 sq mi or 247 acres) and river estuaries.

Wignicourt is a commune in the Ardennes department in northern France.

== Population ==
Historical population
Year	Pop.	±% p.a.
1968	61	—
1975	61	+0.00%
1982	44	−4.56%
1990	52	+2.11%
1999	61	+1.79%
2007	66	+0.99%
2012	64	−0.61%
2017	58	−1.95%
2023	57	−0.29%
Source: INSEE

== See also ==
- Communes of the Ardennes department
