= Vaux-Montreuil =

- Commune
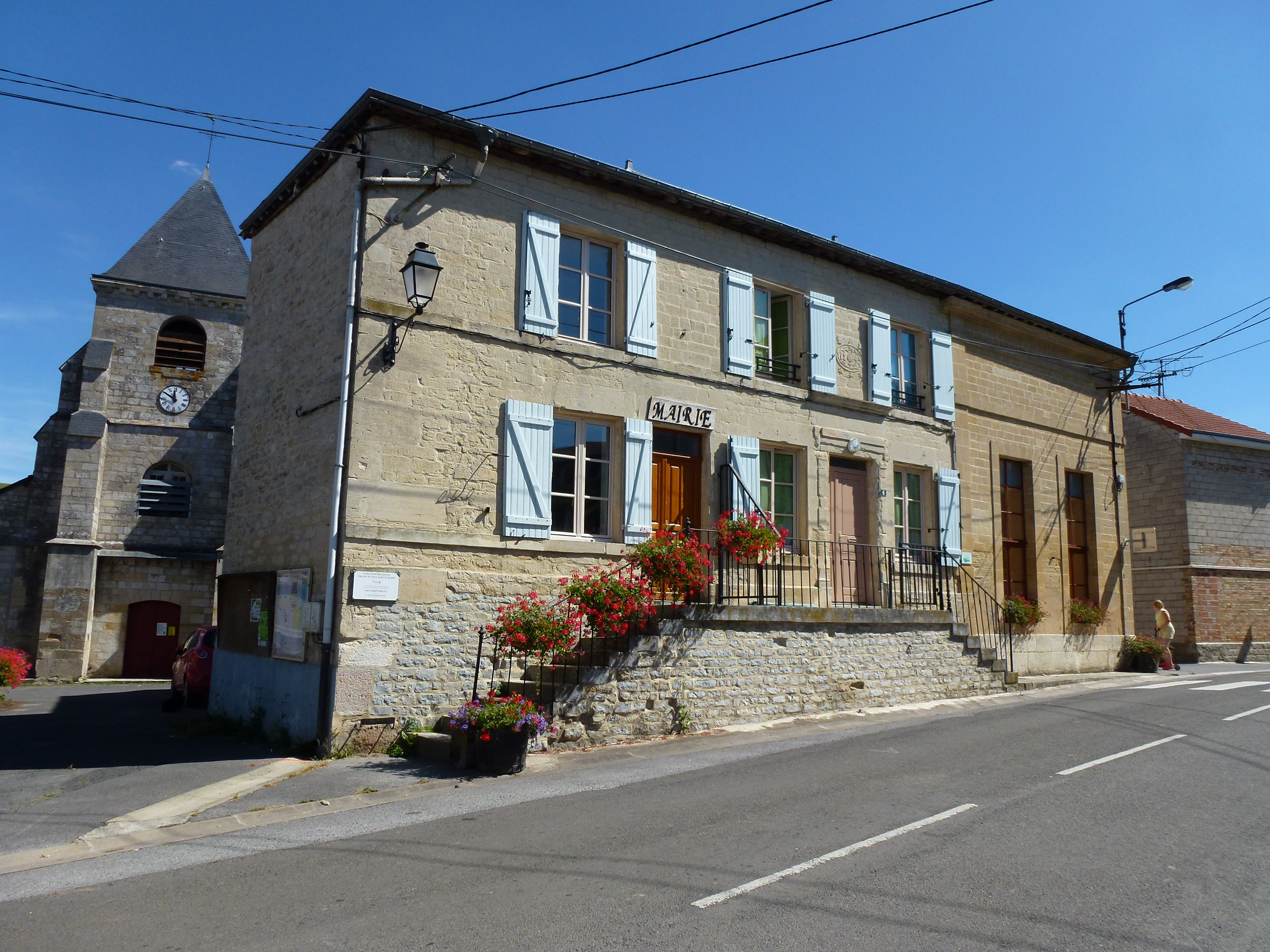
- The town hall in Vaux-Montreuil
- Location of Vaux-Montreuil
- Location within France Location within Grand Est
- Coordinates: 49°34′40″N 4°33′50″E
- Country: France
- Region: Grand Est
- Department: Ardennes
- Arrondissement: Rethel
- Canton: Signy-l'Abbaye
- Intercommunality: Crêtes Préardennaises

Government
  - Mayor (2020–2026): François-Pierre Avril
- Area^{1}: 8.35 km^{2} (3.22 sq mi)
- Elevation: 147 m (482 ft)
- Population (2023): 110
  - Density: 13/km^{2} (34/sq mi)
- Time zone: UTC+01:00 (CET)
  - Summer (DST): UTC+02:00 (CEST)
- INSEE/Postal code: 08467 /08270
- ^{1} French Land Register data, which excludes lakes, ponds, glaciers > 1 km^{2} (0.386 sq mi or 247 acres) and river estuaries.

Vaux-Montreuil (French pronunciation: [vo mɔ̃tʁœj]) is a commune in the Ardennes department in northern France.

== Population ==
Historical population
Year	Pop.	±% p.a.
1968	101	—
1975	98	−0.43%
1982	88	−1.53%
1990	79	−1.34%
1999	102	+2.88%
2007	104	+0.24%
2012	110	+1.13%
2017	108	−0.37%
2023	110	+0.31%
Source: INSEE

== See also ==
- Communes of the Ardennes department
