= Gruyères, Ardennes =

Gruyères
- Commune
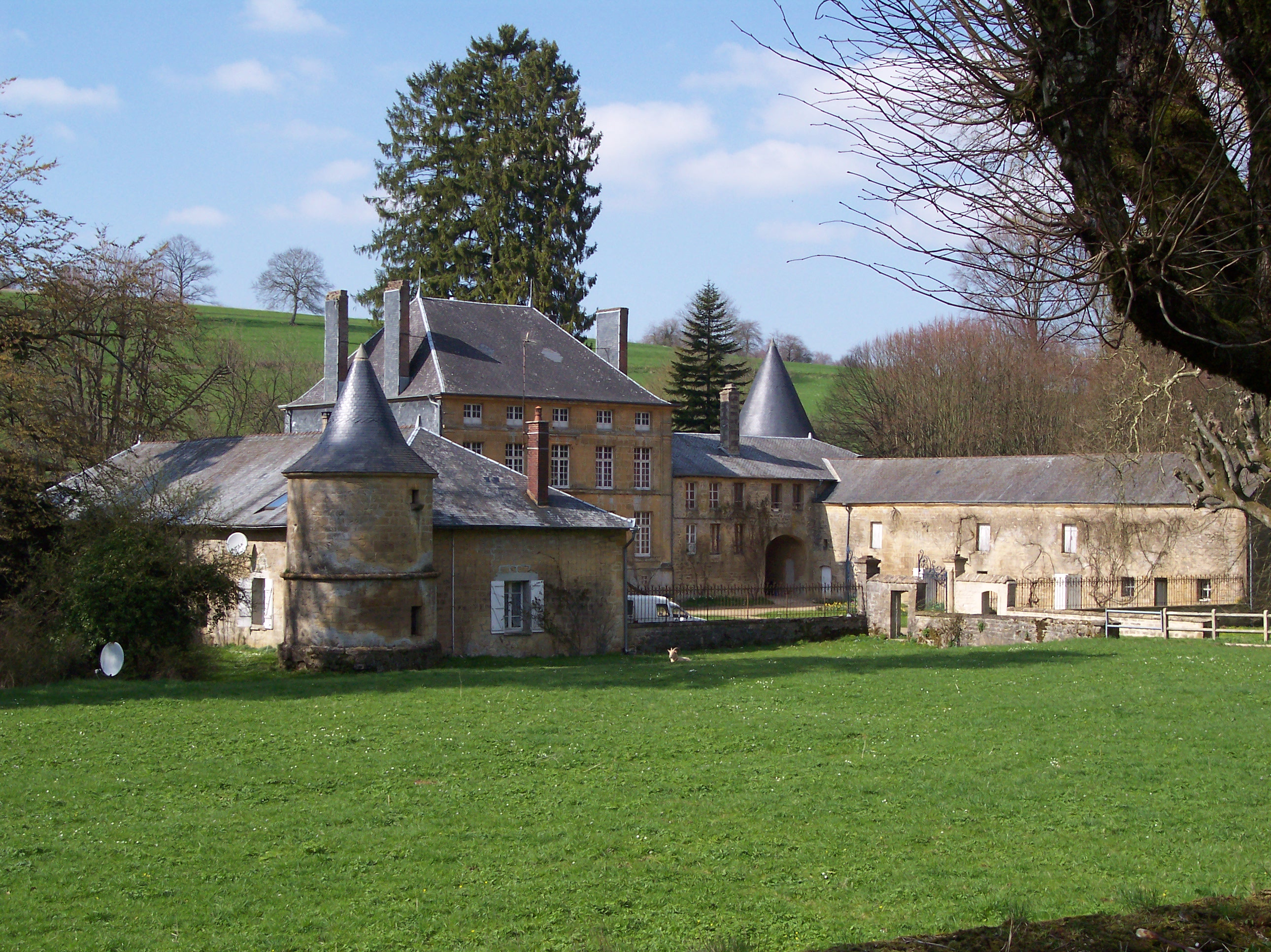
- The chateau in Gruyères

- Coat of arms
- Location of Gruyères
- Location within France Location within Grand Est
- Coordinates: 49°42′38″N 4°36′09″E
- Country: France
- Region: Grand Est
- Department: Ardennes
- Arrondissement: Charleville-Mézières
- Canton: Signy-l'Abbaye
- Intercommunality: Crêtes Préardennaises

Government
  - Mayor (2020–2026): Bernard Blaimont
- Area^{1}: 5.48 km^{2} (2.12 sq mi)
- Elevation: 220 m (720 ft)
- Highest elevation: 306 m (1,004 ft)
- Lowest elevation: 211 m (692 ft)
- Population (2023): 102
  - Density: 18.6/km^{2} (48.2/sq mi)
- Time zone: UTC+01:00 (CET)
  - Summer (DST): UTC+02:00 (CEST)
- INSEE/Postal code: 08201 /08430
- ^{1} French Land Register data, which excludes lakes, ponds, glaciers > 1 km^{2} (0.386 sq mi or 247 acres) and river estuaries.

Gruyères (French pronunciation: [ɡʁɥijɛʁ]) is a commune in the Ardennes department in northern France.

== Population ==
Historical population
Year	Pop.	±% p.a.
1968	34	—
1975	44	+3.75%
1982	49	+1.55%
1990	52	+0.75%
1999	51	−0.22%
2007	62	+2.47%
2012	79	+4.97%
2017	99	+4.62%
2023	102	+0.50%
Source: INSEE

== See also ==
- Communes of the Ardennes department
