= Saint-Jean-aux-Bois, Ardennes =

Saint-Jean-aux-Bois
- Commune
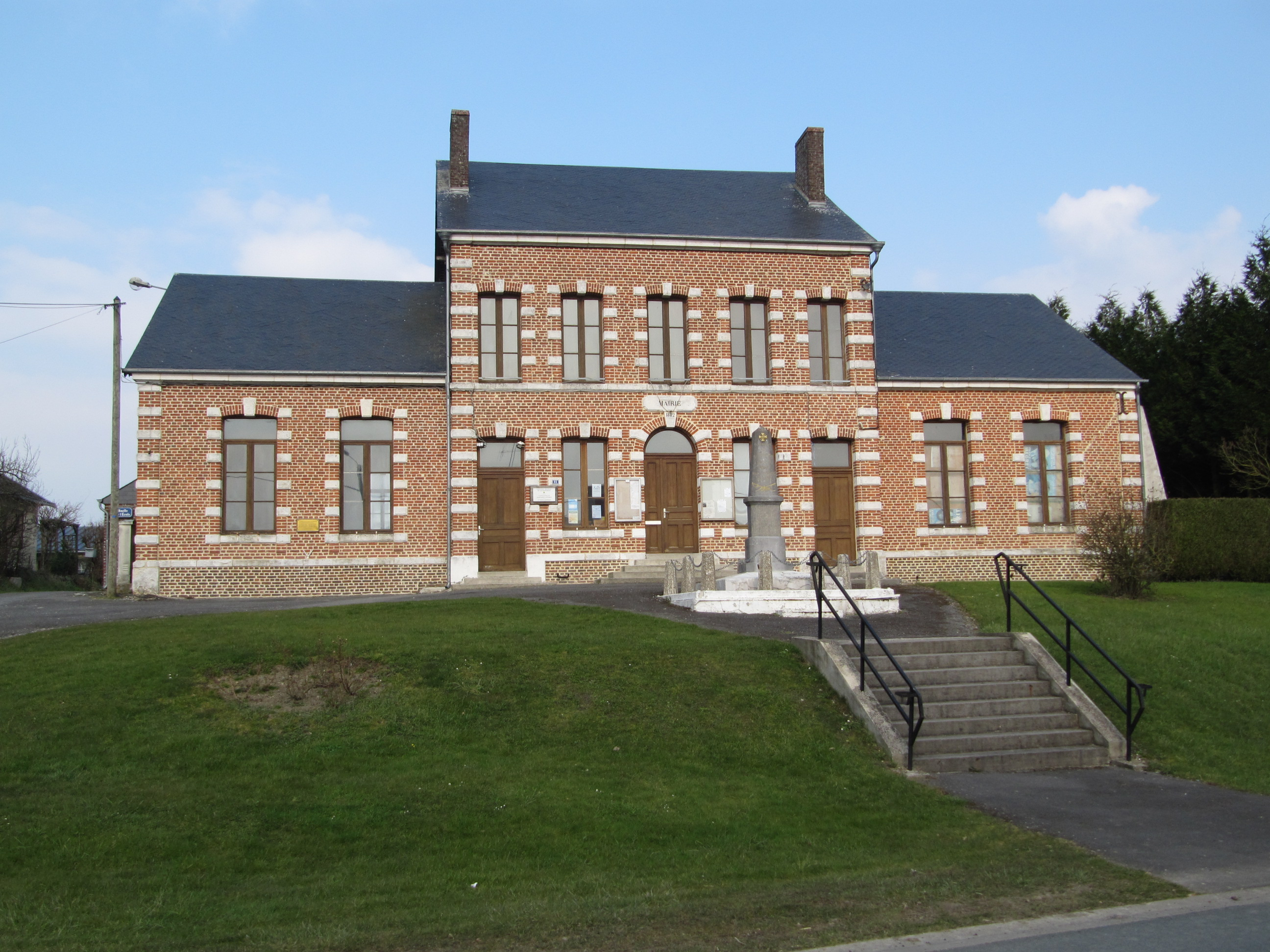
- The town hall in Saint-Jean-aux-Bois
- Location of Saint-Jean-aux-Bois
- Location within France Location within Grand Est
- Coordinates: 49°43′33″N 4°18′27″E
- Country: France
- Region: Grand Est
- Department: Ardennes
- Arrondissement: Rethel
- Canton: Signy-l'Abbaye
- Intercommunality: Crêtes Préardennaises

Government
  - Mayor (2024–2026): Jean-Marie Dehaibe
- Area^{1}: 8.9 km^{2} (3.4 sq mi)
- Elevation: 210 m (690 ft)
- Population (2023): 91
  - Density: 10/km^{2} (26/sq mi)
- Time zone: UTC+01:00 (CET)
  - Summer (DST): UTC+02:00 (CEST)
- INSEE/Postal code: 08382 /08220
- ^{1} French Land Register data, which excludes lakes, ponds, glaciers > 1 km^{2} (0.386 sq mi or 247 acres) and river estuaries.

Saint-Jean-aux-Bois (French pronunciation: [sɛ̃ ʒɑ̃ o bwa]) is a commune in the Ardennes department in northern France.

== Population ==
Historical population
Year	Pop.	±% p.a.
1968	246	—
1975	201	−2.84%
1982	161	−3.12%
1990	139	−1.82%
1999	138	−0.08%
2007	141	+0.27%
2012	139	−0.29%
2017	107	−5.10%
2023	91	−2.66%
Source: INSEE

== See also ==
- Communes of the Ardennes department
