= Remaucourt, Ardennes =

Remaucourt
- Commune
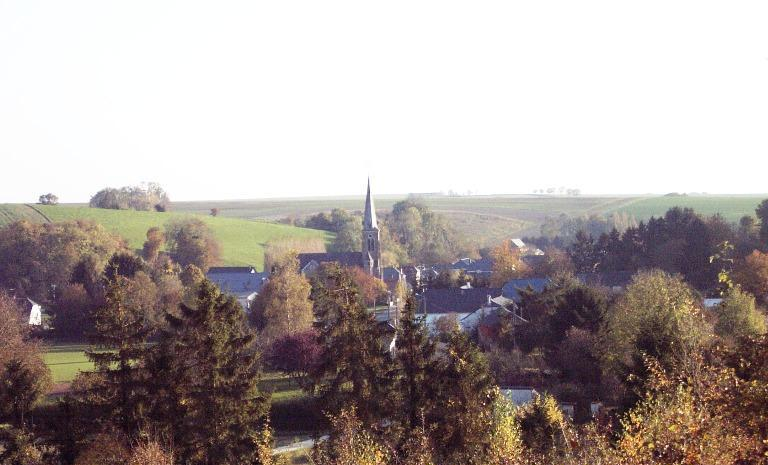
- A general view of Remaucourt
- Location of Remaucourt
- Location within France Location within Grand Est
- Coordinates: 49°36′32″N 4°14′11″E
- Country: France
- Region: Grand Est
- Department: Ardennes
- Arrondissement: Rethel
- Canton: Signy-l'Abbaye
- Intercommunality: Crêtes Préardennaises

Government
  - Mayor (2020–2026): Jean-Pierre Douté
- Area^{1}: 10.8 km^{2} (4.2 sq mi)
- Elevation: 110 m (360 ft)
- Population (2023): 169
  - Density: 15.6/km^{2} (40.5/sq mi)
- Time zone: UTC+01:00 (CET)
  - Summer (DST): UTC+02:00 (CEST)
- INSEE/Postal code: 08356 /08220
- ^{1} French Land Register data, which excludes lakes, ponds, glaciers > 1 km^{2} (0.386 sq mi or 247 acres) and river estuaries.

Remaucourt (French pronunciation: [ʁəmokuʁ]) is a commune in the Ardennes department in northern France.

== Population ==
Historical population
Year	Pop.	±% p.a.
1968	198	—
1975	161	−2.91%
1982	135	−2.48%
1990	135	+0.00%
1999	135	+0.00%
2007	156	+1.82%
2012	159	+0.38%
2017	173	+1.70%
2023	169	−0.39%
Source: INSEE

== See also ==
- Communes of the Ardennes department
