= Renneville, Ardennes =

Renneville
- Commune
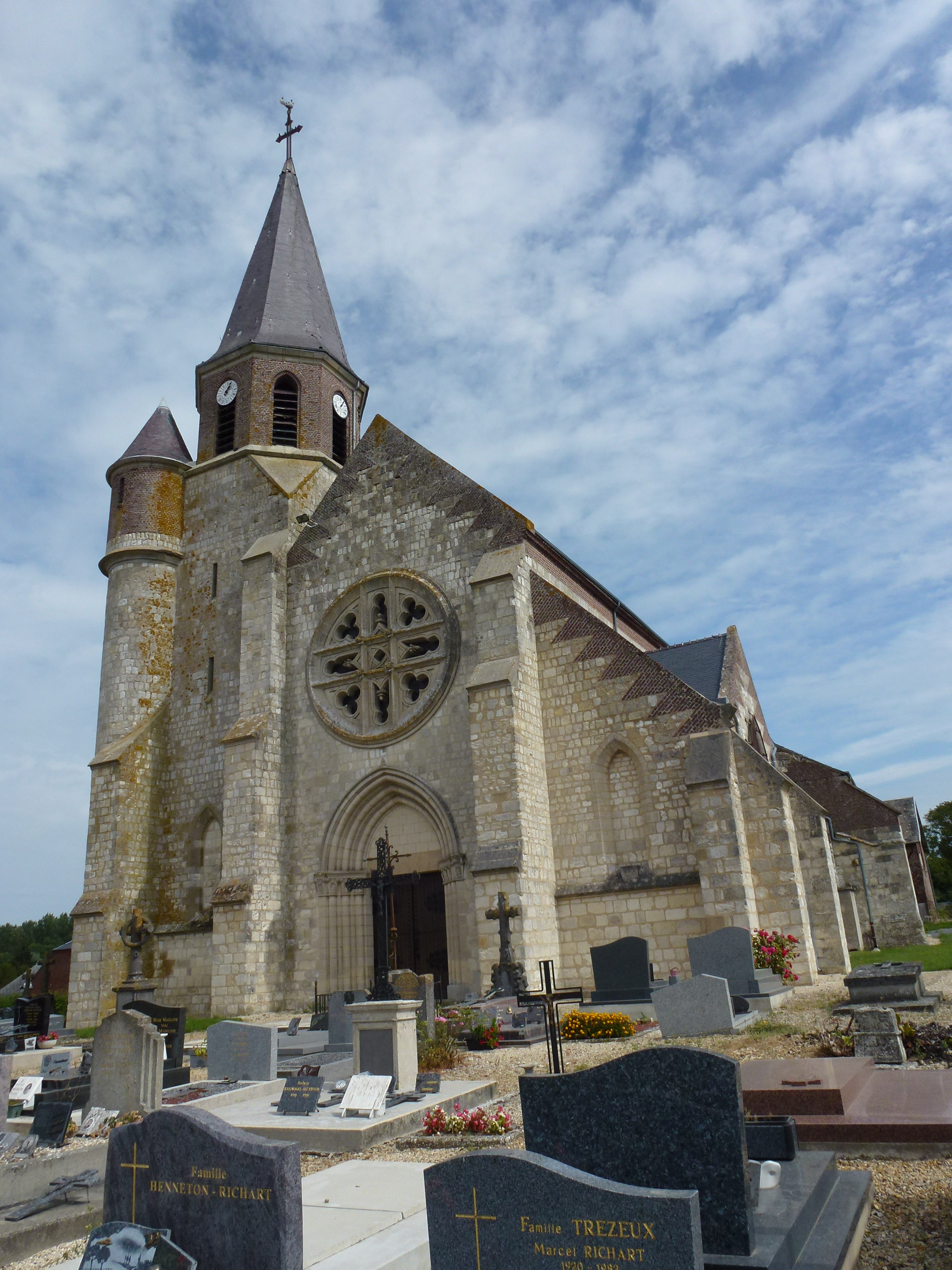
- The church in Renneville

- Coat of arms
- Location of Renneville
- Location within France Location within Grand Est
- Coordinates: 49°39′30″N 4°07′50″E
- Country: France
- Region: Grand Est
- Department: Ardennes
- Arrondissement: Rethel
- Canton: Signy-l'Abbaye
- Intercommunality: Crêtes Préardennaises

Government
  - Mayor (2020–2026): Yves Brédy
- Area^{1}: 9.85 km^{2} (3.80 sq mi)
- Elevation: 132 m (433 ft)
- Population (2023): 187
  - Density: 19.0/km^{2} (49.2/sq mi)
- Time zone: UTC+01:00 (CET)
  - Summer (DST): UTC+02:00 (CEST)
- INSEE/Postal code: 08360 /08220
- ^{1} French Land Register data, which excludes lakes, ponds, glaciers > 1 km^{2} (0.386 sq mi or 247 acres) and river estuaries.

Renneville (French pronunciation: [ʁɛnvil]) is a commune in the Ardennes department in northern France.

== Population ==
Historical population
Year	Pop.	±% p.a.
1968	325	—
1975	294	−1.42%
1982	248	−2.40%
1990	206	−2.29%
1999	235	+1.47%
2007	209	−1.45%
2012	205	−0.39%
2017	203	−0.20%
2023	187	−1.36%
Source: INSEE

== Politics and administration ==
Following the municipal elections of 2014, the municipal council meeting on 28 March 2014 could not elect of mayor, no candidate not proposing. The municipality is then administered by Philippe Dumange, the only city councilor who has not resigned, pending new elections held on 18 and 25 May 2014, which led to the election of Yves Brédy, mayor of the village during 2008–2014.

== See also ==
- Communes of the Ardennes department
