= Auvillers-les-Forges =

- Commune
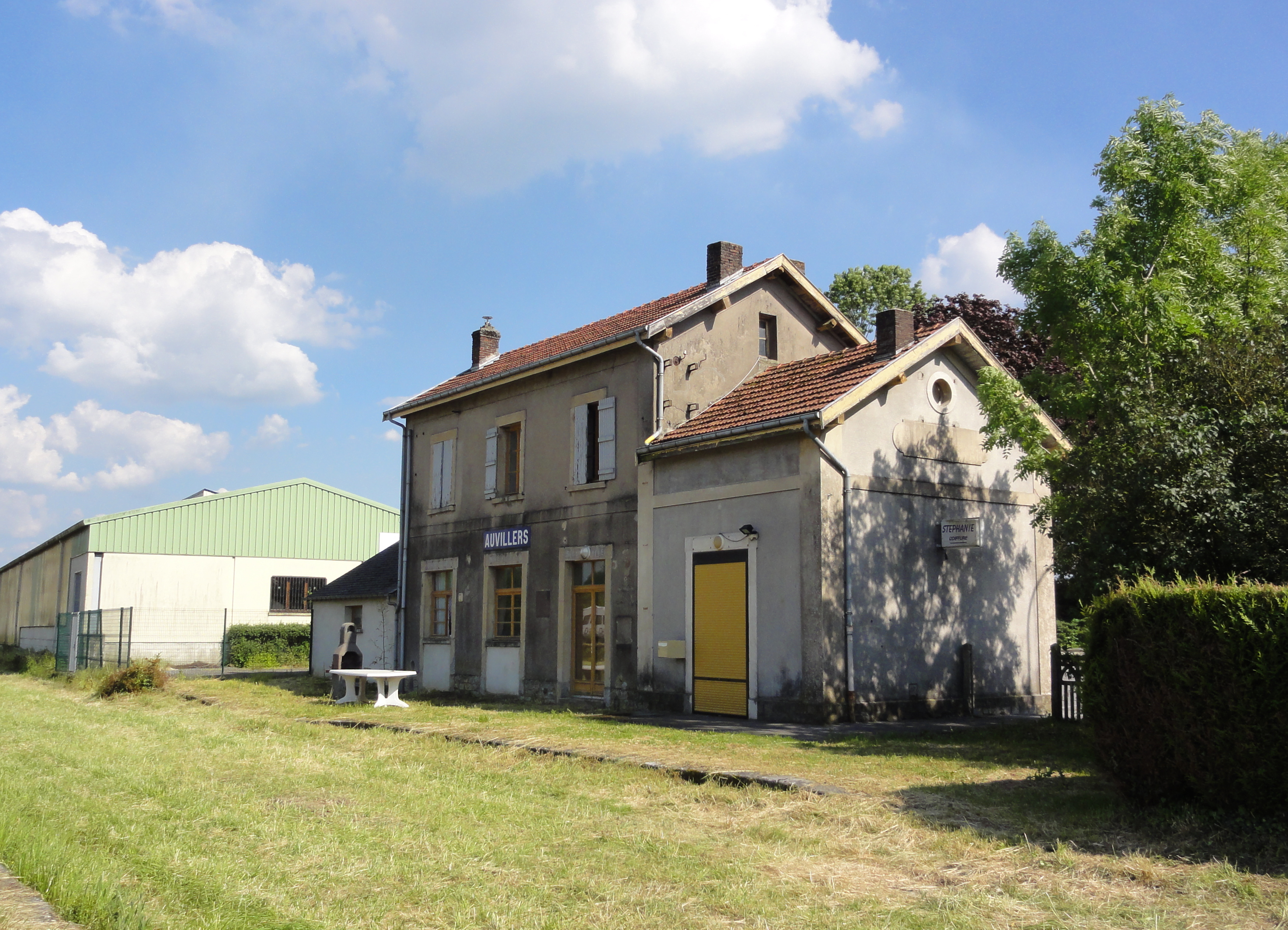
- The old railway station

- Coat of arms
- Location of Auvillers-les-Forges
- Location within France Location within Grand Est
- Coordinates: 49°51′49″N 4°21′31″E
- Country: France
- Region: Grand Est
- Department: Ardennes
- Arrondissement: Charleville-Mézières
- Canton: Rocroi
- Intercommunality: CC Ardennes Thiérache

Government
  - Mayor (2020–2026): Miguel Leroy
- Area^{1}: 8.19 km^{2} (3.16 sq mi)
- Elevation: 290 m (950 ft)
- Highest elevation: 296 m (971 ft)
- Lowest elevation: 235 m (771 ft)
- Population (2023): 909
  - Density: 111/km^{2} (287/sq mi)
- Time zone: UTC+01:00 (CET)
  - Summer (DST): UTC+02:00 (CEST)
- INSEE/Postal code: 08037 /08260
- ^{1} French Land Register data, which excludes lakes, ponds, glaciers > 1 km^{2} (0.386 sq mi or 247 acres) and river estuaries.

Auvillers-les-Forges is a commune in the Ardennes department in the Grand Est region of northern France.

== Geography ==
Auvillers-les-Forges is located some 27 km west by north-west of Charleville-Mézières and 22 km east by south-east of Hirson. Access to the commune is by the European route E44 from Maubert-Fontaine in the east which passes through the north of the commune intersecting the D877 in the commune and continuing to Hirson in the west. Access to the village is by the D877 from Éteignières in the north which passes through the length of the commune and the village and continues south to Champlin. The D20 goes south-east from the village to Girondelle. Apart from the village there is the hamlet of Le Chateau-Vert north-east of the village. There is a large forest in the north of the commune (the Bois d'Auviller-les-Forges) but the rest of the commune is farmland.

The river Sormonne flows through the commune from west to east just north of the village and continues east to join the Meuse at Charleville-Mézières. The Ruisseau de Saint-Rémy rises just west of the village and flows south-west to join the Orvaux east of Fontenelle.

=== Heraldry ===
Arms of Auvillers-les-Forges	Blazon: Party per chevron, Gules with two fleurs-de-lis of Argent first, Azure a forge tongs of Or and a hammer the same saltirewise, tongs to dexter surmounted by hammer to sinister second; over all a chevron of Or.

== Administration ==
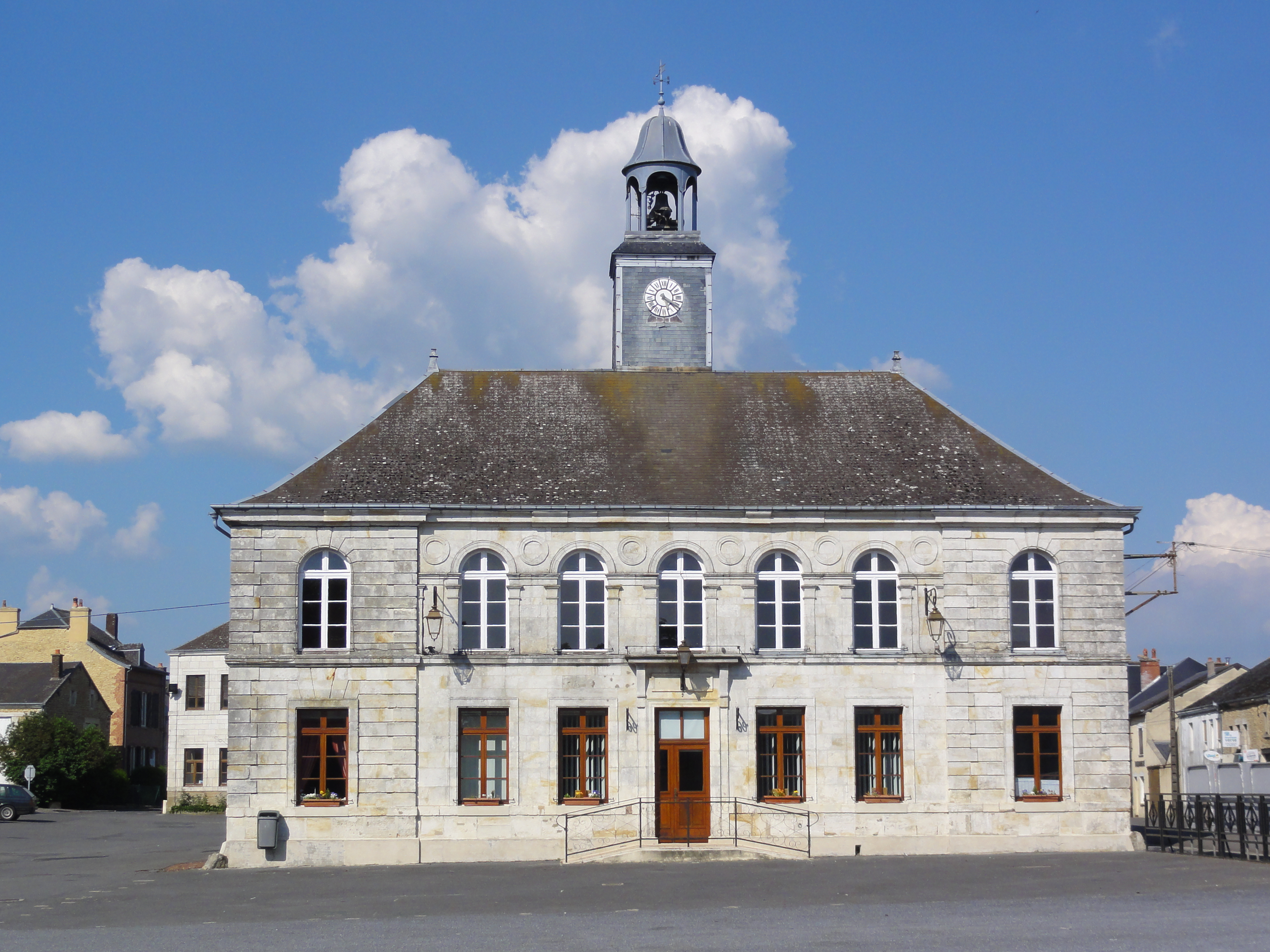
The Town Hall

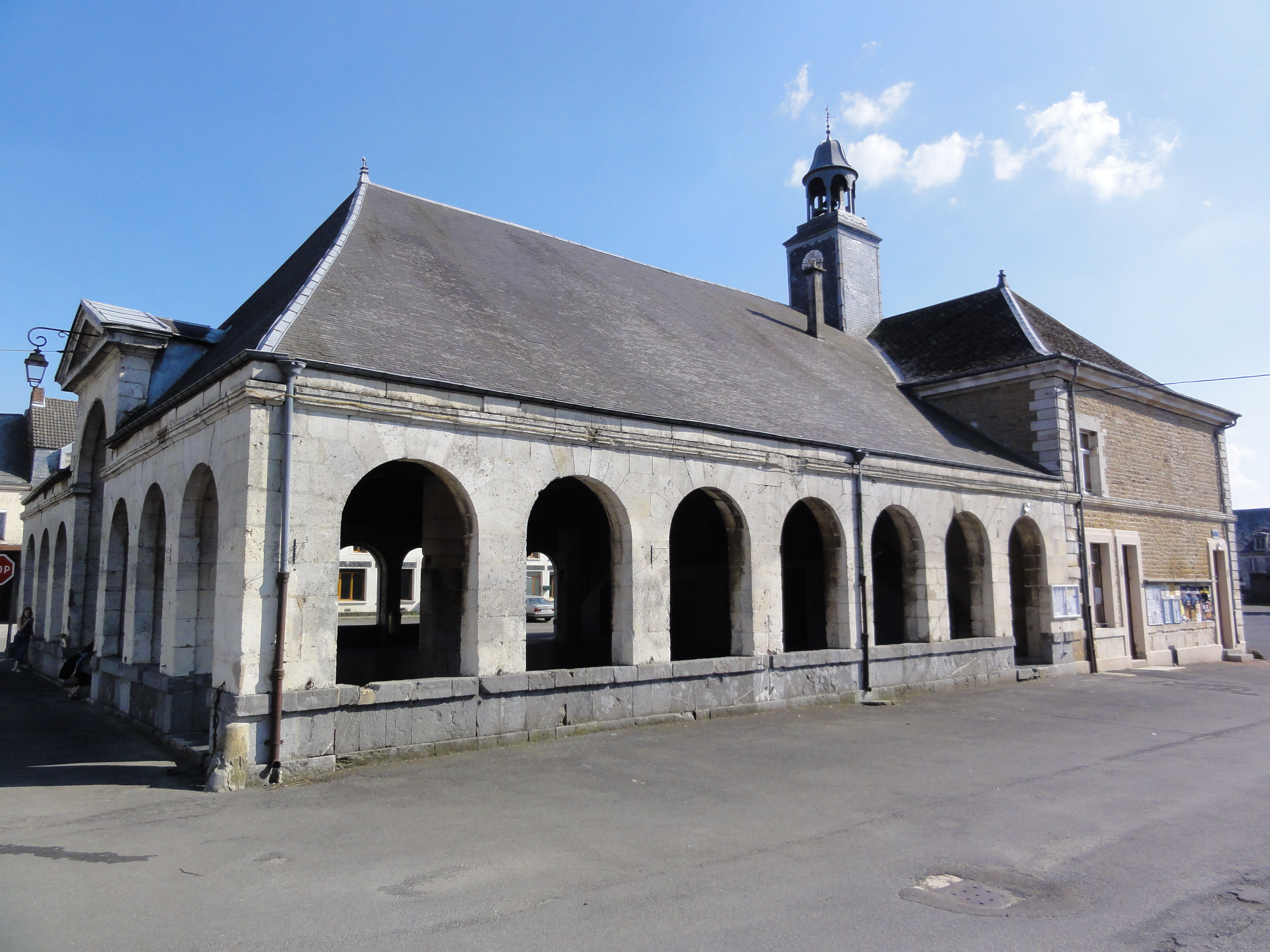
The covered market

List of successive mayors

From	To	Name
1891	1919	Gustave Tanton
1919	1923	Camille Decq
1923	1929	Maurice Tourolle
1929	1944	Paul Martin
1944	1945	Edgard Faucon
1945	1947	Georges Pacaux
1947	1959	Julien Lagneaux
1959	1965	Paul Hottiaux
1965	1980	Abdon Lemaire
1980	1983	Pierre Gillot
1983	1995	Martial Guilain
1995	1998	Bruno Coniglio
1998	2014	Daniel Schanen
2014	current	Miguel Leroy

== Demography ==
Historical population

Year	Pop.	±% p.a.
1793	534	—
1821	632	+0.60%
1846	712	+0.48%
1872	672	−0.22%
1901	720	+0.24%
1921	753	+0.22%
1946	694	−0.33%
1962	803	+0.92%
1968	811	+0.17%

Year	Pop.	±% p.a.
1975	784	−0.48%
1982	799	+0.27%
1990	822	+0.36%
1999	833	+0.15%
2007	894	+0.89%
2012	883	−0.25%
2017	877	−0.14%
2023	909	+0.60%

Source: EHESS and INSEE

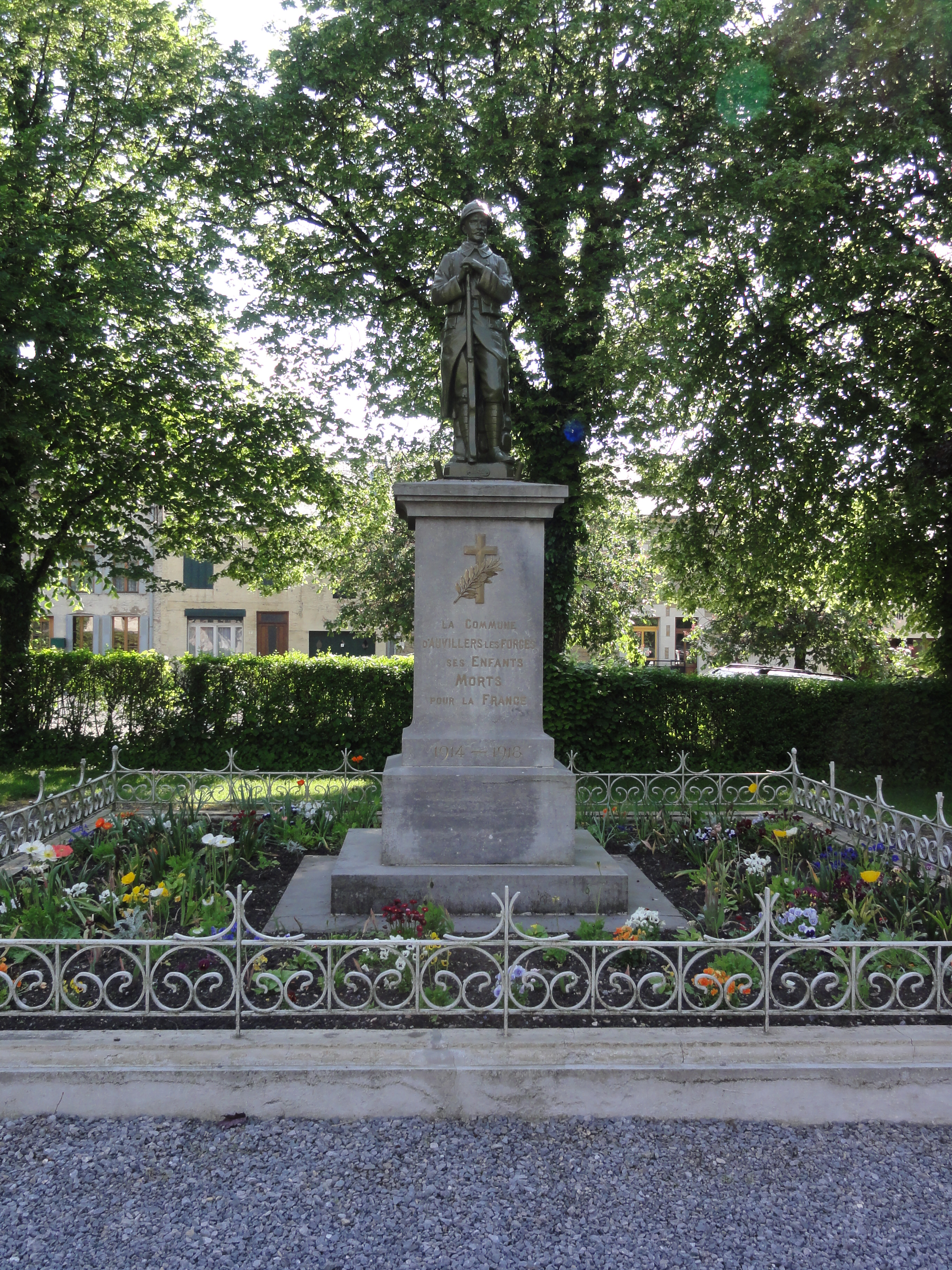
The War Memorial

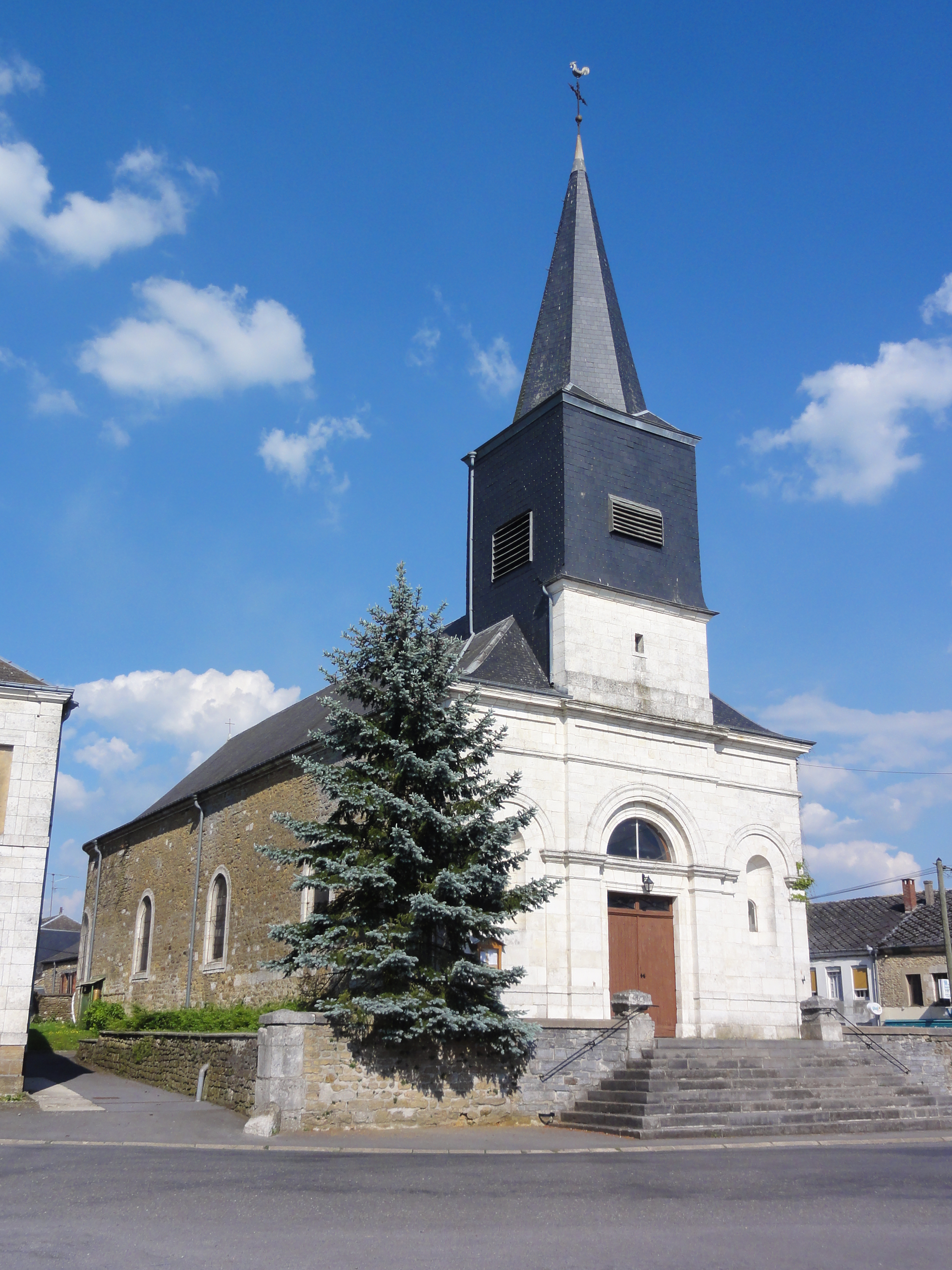
The Church

== See also ==
- Communes of the Ardennes department
