= Étalle =

Étalle may refer to:

- Étalle, Belgium, a municipality in the province of Luxembourg, Belgium
- Étalle, Ardennes, a commune of the Ardennes département, France
