= Marby =

- Commune
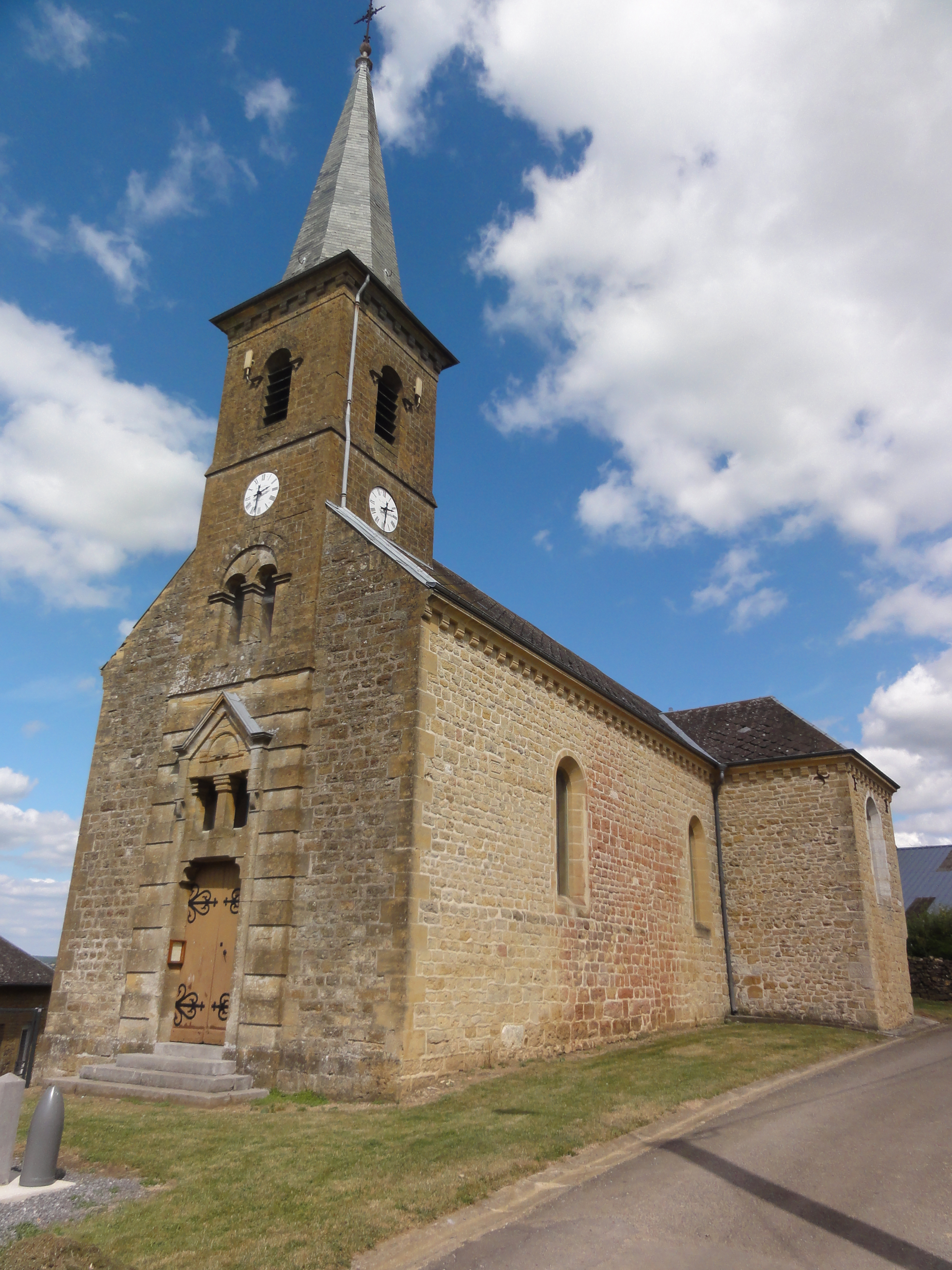
- The church in Marby

- Coat of arms
- Location of Marby
- Location within France Location within Grand Est
- Coordinates: 49°49′47″N 4°25′49″E
- Country: France
- Region: Grand Est
- Department: Ardennes
- Arrondissement: Charleville-Mézières
- Canton: Signy-l'Abbaye

Government
  - Mayor (2020–2026): Marie-Claire Doré
- Area^{1}: 7.35 km^{2} (2.84 sq mi)
- Elevation: 306 m (1,004 ft)
- Population (2023): 72
  - Density: 9.8/km^{2} (25/sq mi)
- Time zone: UTC+01:00 (CET)
  - Summer (DST): UTC+02:00 (CEST)
- INSEE/Postal code: 08273 /08260
- ^{1} French Land Register data, which excludes lakes, ponds, glaciers > 1 km^{2} (0.386 sq mi or 247 acres) and river estuaries.

Marby (French pronunciation: [maʁbi]) is a commune in the Ardennes department in northern France.

== Geography ==
The Sormonne flows through the commune.

== Population ==
Historical population
Year	Pop.	±% p.a.
1968	108	—
1975	87	−3.04%
1982	82	−0.84%
1990	69	−2.13%
1999	66	−0.49%
2007	64	−0.38%
2012	64	+0.00%
2017	62	−0.63%
2023	72	+2.52%
Source: INSEE

== See also ==
- Communes of the Ardennes department
