= Cliron =

- Commune
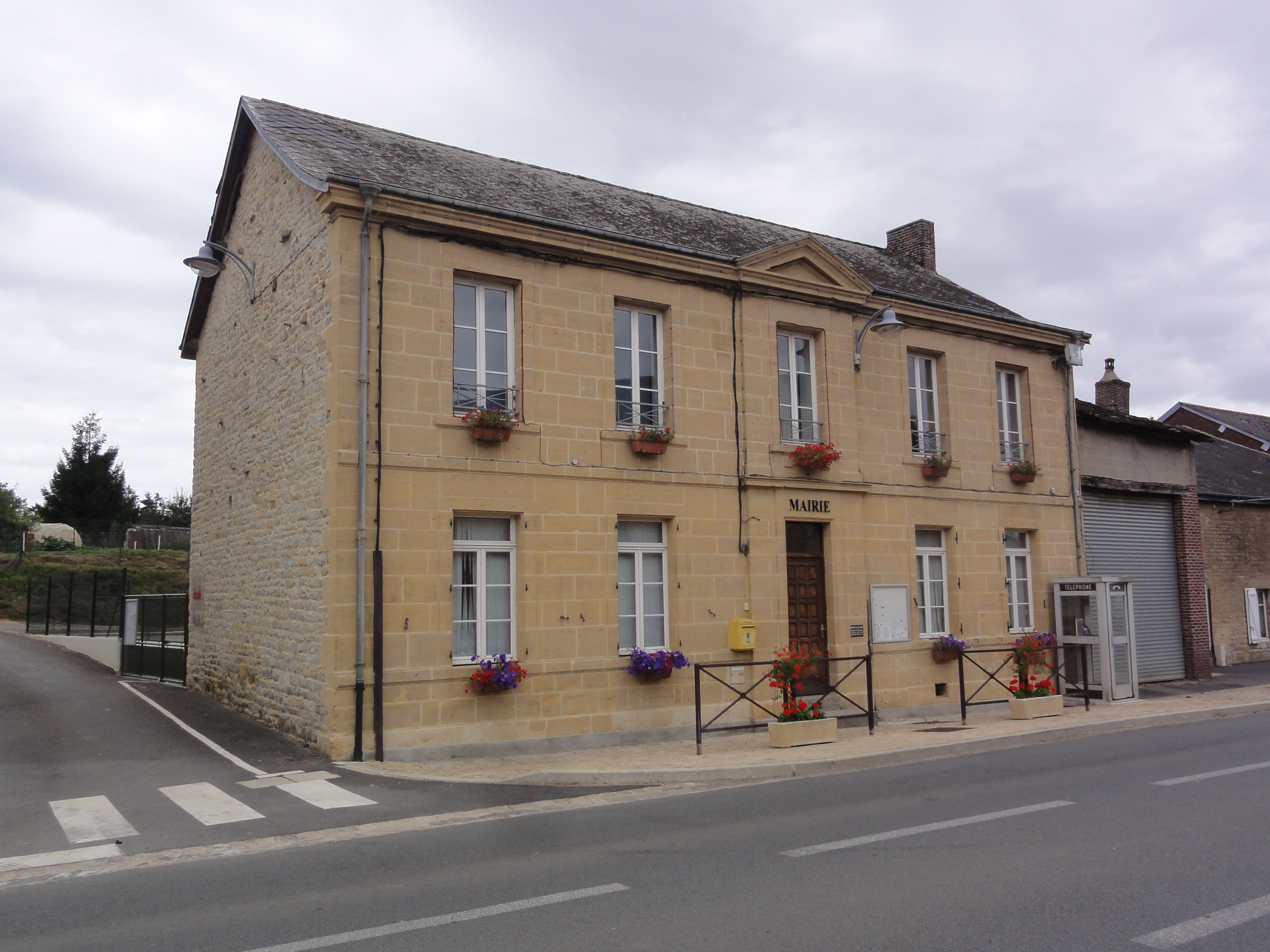
- The town hall in Cliron

- Coat of arms
- Location of Cliron
- Location within France Location within Grand Est
- Coordinates: 49°48′41″N 4°36′51″E
- Country: France
- Region: Grand Est
- Department: Ardennes
- Arrondissement: Charleville-Mézières
- Canton: Charleville-Mézières-1
- Intercommunality: CA Ardenne Métropole

Government
  - Mayor (2020–2026): Jean-Luc Pinteaux
- Area^{1}: 6.18 km^{2} (2.39 sq mi)
- Elevation: 182 m (597 ft)
- Highest elevation: 245 m (804 ft)
- Lowest elevation: 149 m (489 ft)
- Population (2023): 409
  - Density: 66.2/km^{2} (171/sq mi)
- Time zone: UTC+01:00 (CET)
  - Summer (DST): UTC+02:00 (CEST)
- INSEE/Postal code: 08125 /08090
- ^{1} French Land Register data, which excludes lakes, ponds, glaciers > 1 km^{2} (0.386 sq mi or 247 acres) and river estuaries.

Cliron (French pronunciation: [kliʁɔ̃]) is a commune in the Ardennes department in northern France.

== Geography ==
The Sormonne forms part of the commune's southern border.

== Population ==
Historical population
Year	Pop.	±% p.a.
1968	187	—
1975	186	−0.08%
1982	267	+5.30%
1990	265	−0.09%
1999	280	+0.61%
2007	292	+0.53%
2012	302	+0.68%
2017	377	+4.54%
2023	409	+1.37%
Source: INSEE

== See also ==
- Communes of the Ardennes department
