= Ham-les-Moines =

- Commune
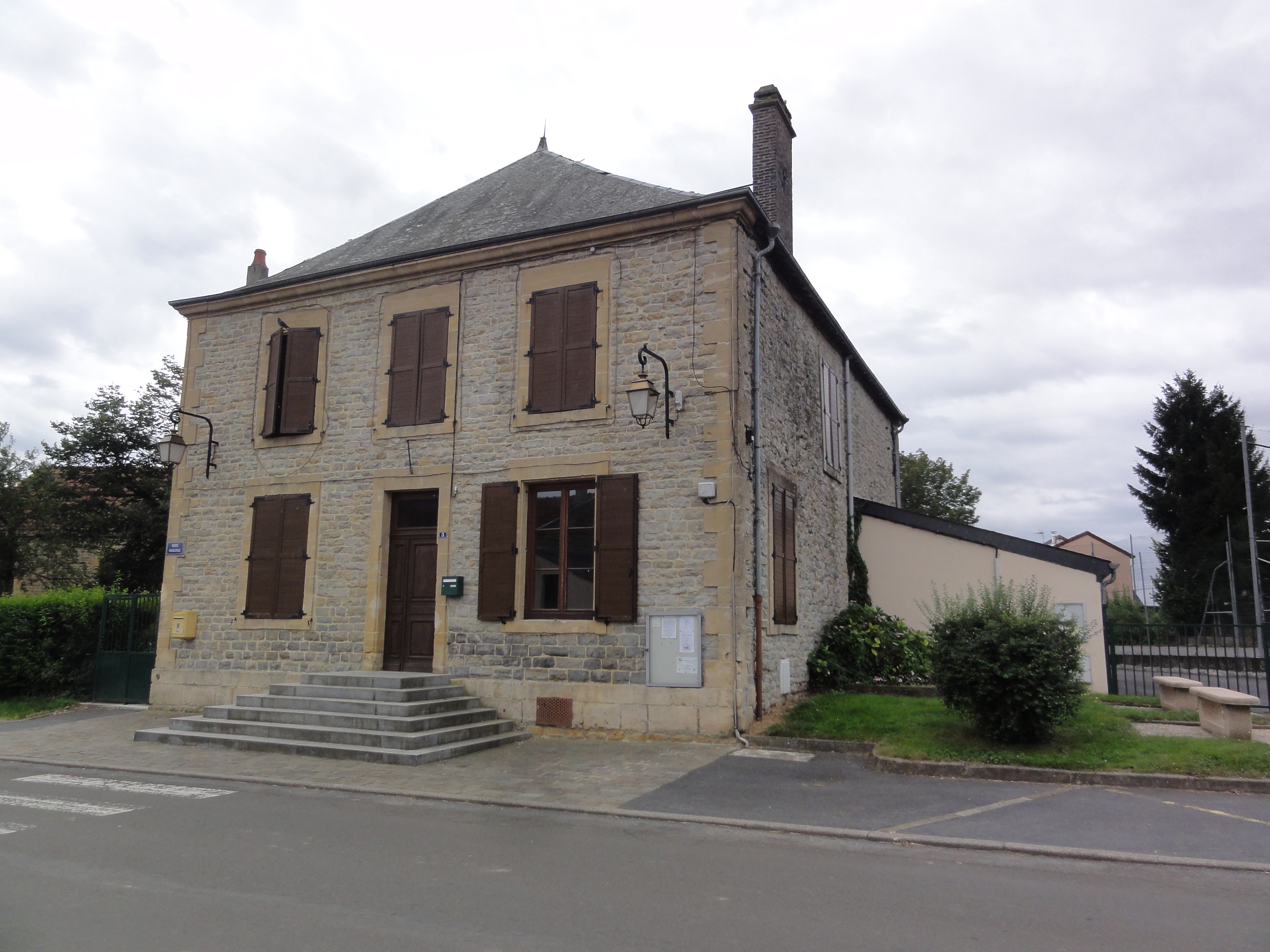
- The town hall in Ham-les-Moines
- Location of Ham-les-Moines
- Location within France Location within Grand Est
- Coordinates: 49°47′46″N 4°35′52″E
- Country: France
- Region: Grand Est
- Department: Ardennes
- Arrondissement: Charleville-Mézières
- Canton: Rocroi
- Intercommunality: Vallées et Plateau d'Ardenne

Government
  - Mayor (2020–2026): Jérôme Tissoux
- Area^{1}: 3.12 km^{2} (1.20 sq mi)
- Elevation: 160 m (520 ft)
- Population (2023): 356
  - Density: 114/km^{2} (296/sq mi)
- Time zone: UTC+01:00 (CET)
  - Summer (DST): UTC+02:00 (CEST)
- INSEE/Postal code: 08206 /08090
- ^{1} French Land Register data, which excludes lakes, ponds, glaciers > 1 km^{2} (0.386 sq mi or 247 acres) and river estuaries.

Ham-les-Moines is a commune in the Ardennes department in the Grand Est region in northern France.

== Geography ==
The river Sormonne flows through the commune and forms part of its western and eastern borders.

== Population ==
Historical population
Year	Pop.	±% p.a.
1968	237	—
1975	264	+1.55%
1982	300	+1.84%
1990	365	+2.48%
1999	358	−0.21%
2007	353	−0.18%
2012	387	+1.86%
2017	372	−0.79%
2023	356	−0.73%
Source: INSEE

== See also ==
- Communes of the Ardennes department
