= Haudrecy =

- Commune
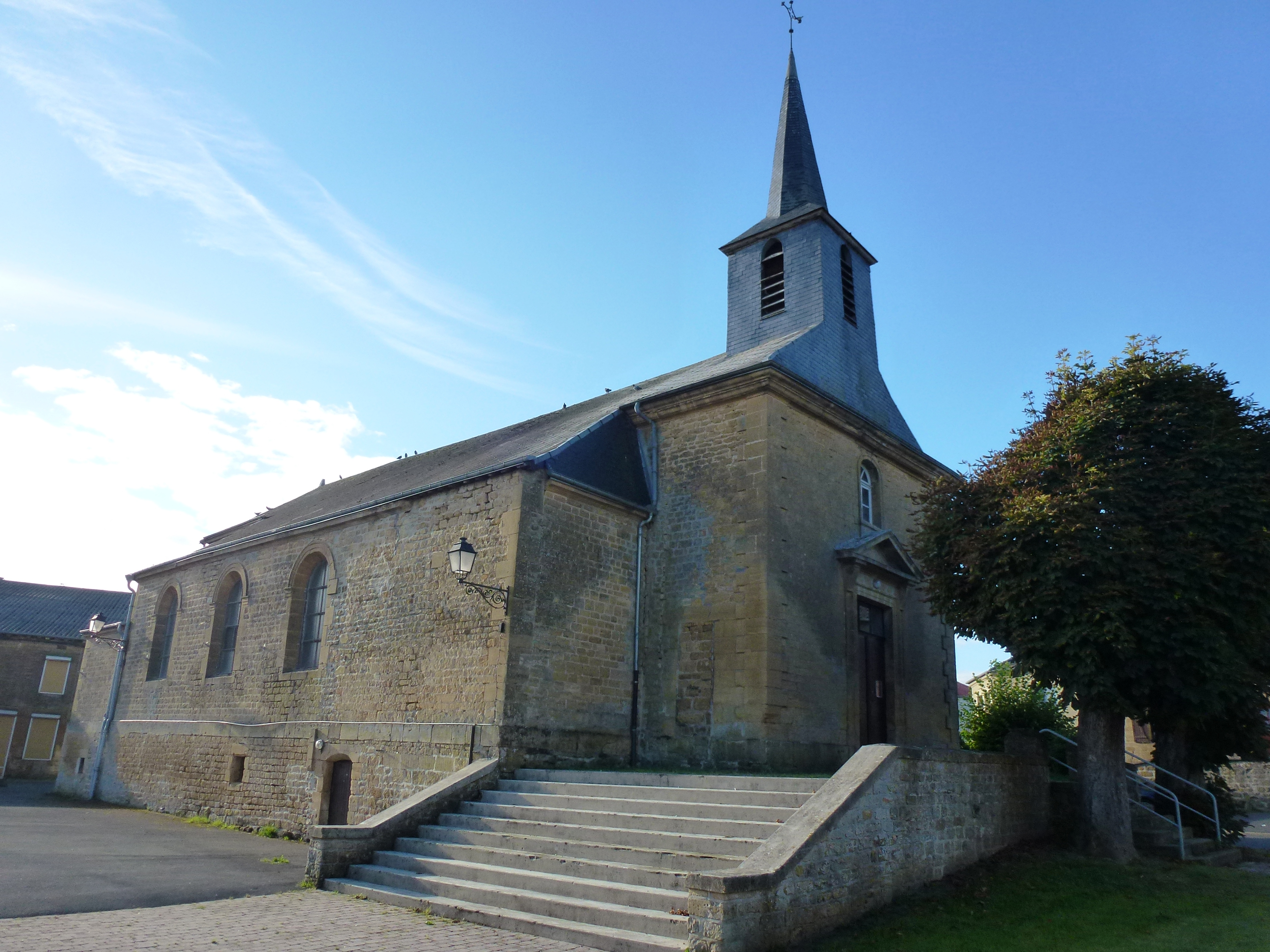
- The church in Haudrecy

- Coat of arms
- Location of Haudrecy
- Location within France Location within Grand Est
- Coordinates: 49°47′14″N 4°36′59″E
- Country: France
- Region: Grand Est
- Department: Ardennes
- Arrondissement: Charleville-Mézières
- Canton: Charleville-Mézières-1
- Intercommunality: CA Ardenne Métropole

Government
  - Mayor (2020–2026): Philippe Claude
- Area^{1}: 3.36 km^{2} (1.30 sq mi)
- Elevation: 155 m (509 ft)
- Population (2023): 334
  - Density: 99.4/km^{2} (257/sq mi)
- Time zone: UTC+01:00 (CET)
  - Summer (DST): UTC+02:00 (CEST)
- INSEE/Postal code: 08216 /08090
- ^{1} French Land Register data, which excludes lakes, ponds, glaciers > 1 km^{2} (0.386 sq mi or 247 acres) and river estuaries.

Haudrecy (French pronunciation: [odʁəsi]) is a commune in the Ardennes department in northern France.

== Geography ==
The Sormonne forms most of the commune's northern border.

== Population ==
Historical population
Year	Pop.	±% p.a.
1968	118	—
1975	143	+2.78%
1982	170	+2.50%
1990	196	+1.79%
1999	266	+3.45%
2007	295	+1.30%
2012	283	−0.83%
2017	305	+1.51%
2023	334	+1.53%
Source: INSEE

== See also ==
- Communes of the Ardennes department
