= Chilly, Ardennes =

Chilly
- Commune
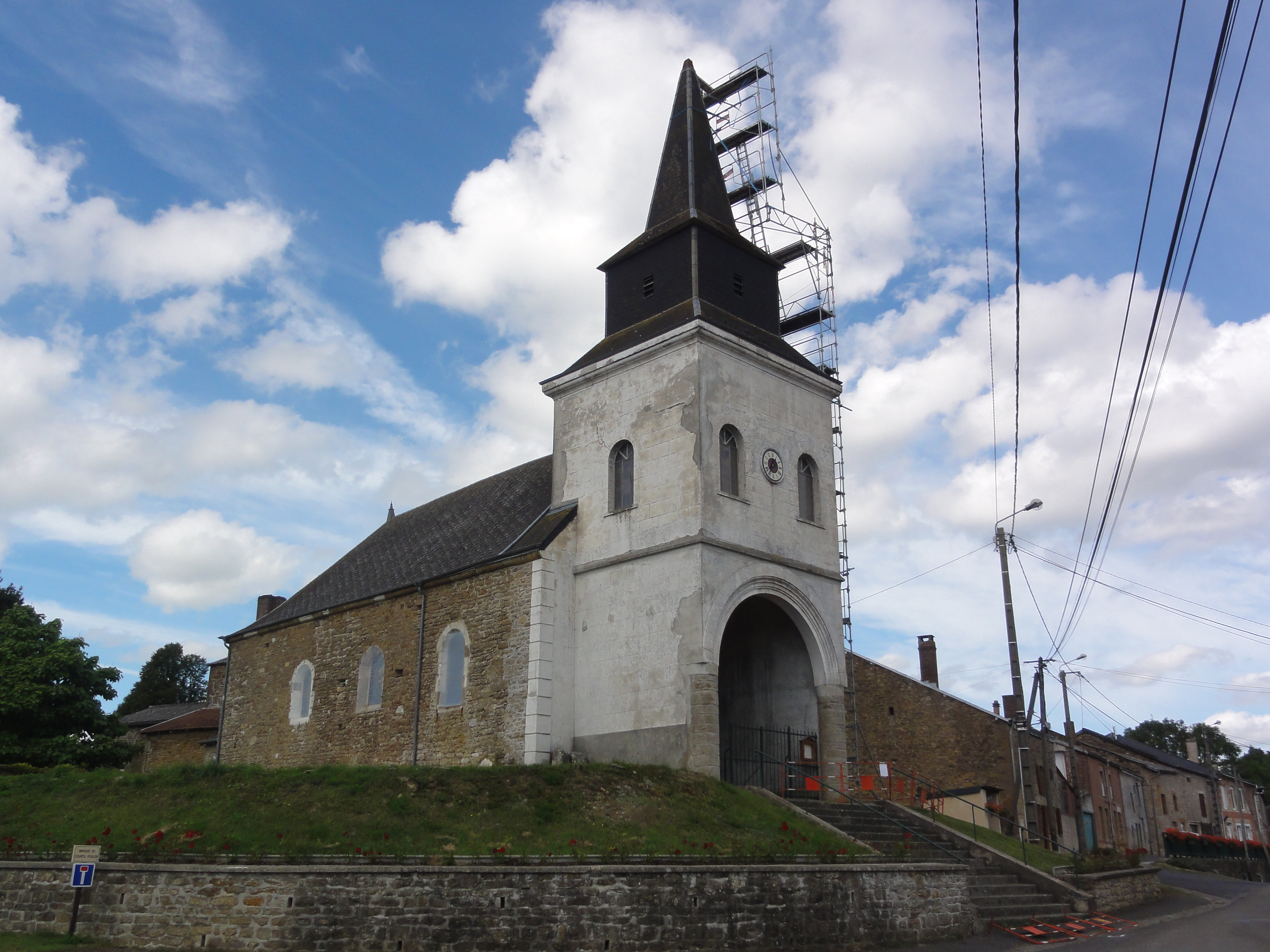
- The church in Chilly

- Coat of arms
- Location of Chilly
- Location within France Location within Grand Est
- Coordinates: 49°50′20″N 4°28′30″E
- Country: France
- Region: Grand Est
- Department: Ardennes
- Arrondissement: Charleville-Mézières
- Canton: Rocroi

Government
  - Mayor (2020–2026): Jean-Claude Chantraine
- Area^{1}: 5.89 km^{2} (2.27 sq mi)
- Elevation: 215 m (705 ft)
- Population (2023): 134
  - Density: 22.8/km^{2} (58.9/sq mi)
- Time zone: UTC+01:00 (CET)
  - Summer (DST): UTC+02:00 (CEST)
- INSEE/Postal code: 08121 /08260
- ^{1} French Land Register data, which excludes lakes, ponds, glaciers > 1 km^{2} (0.386 sq mi or 247 acres) and river estuaries.

Chilly is a commune in the Ardennes department in northern France.

== Geography ==
The Sormonne flows through the commune and forms part of its western border.

== Population ==
Historical population
Year	Pop.	±% p.a.
1968	131	—
1975	133	+0.22%
1982	111	−2.55%
1990	111	+0.00%
1999	113	+0.20%
2007	149	+3.52%
2012	154	+0.66%
2017	143	−1.47%
2023	134	−1.08%
Source: INSEE

== See also ==
- Communes of the Ardennes department
