= Belval, Ardennes =

Belval
- Commune
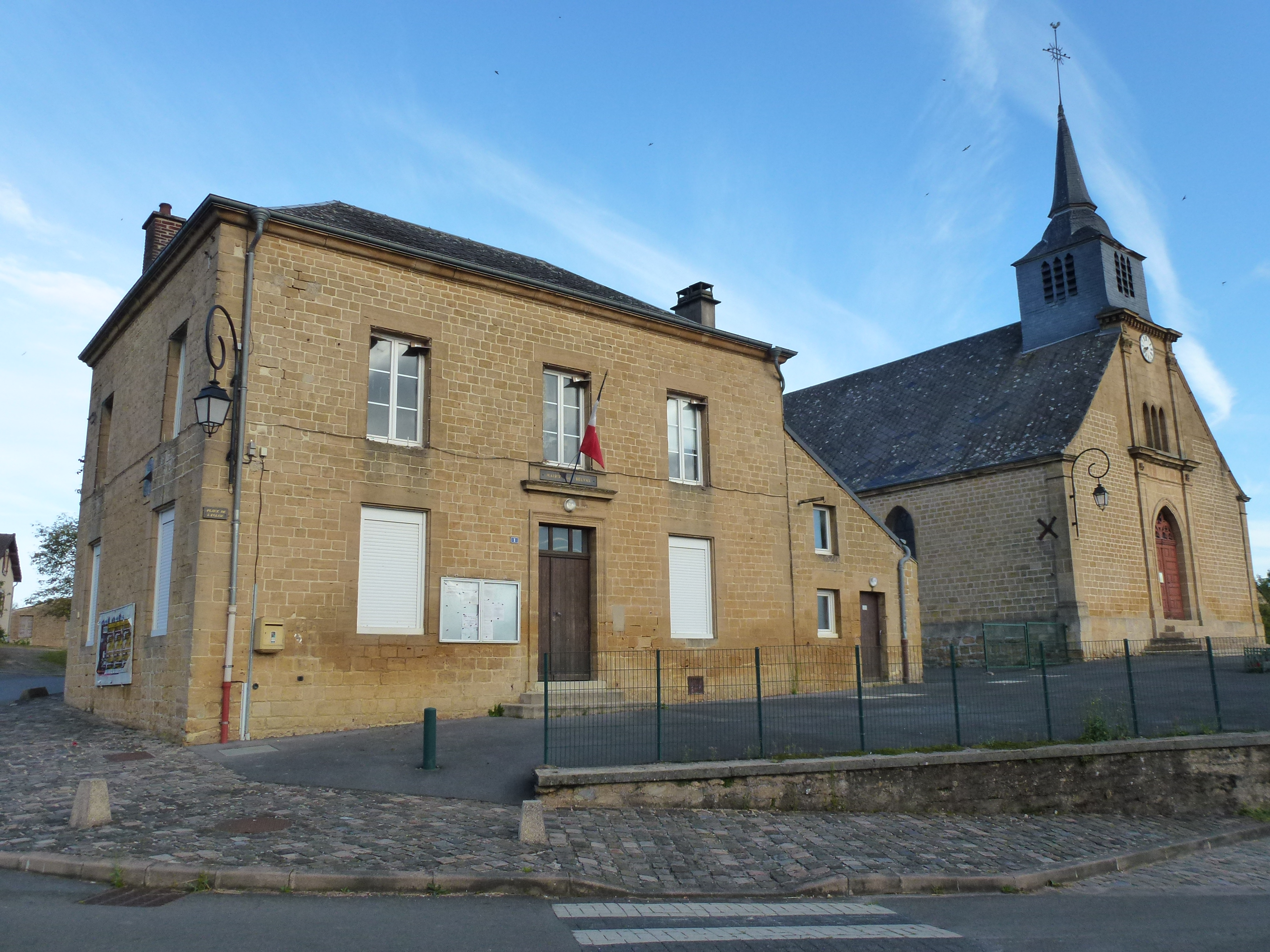
- Town hall and church
- Location of Belval
- Location within France Location within Grand Est
- Coordinates: 49°46′38″N 4°38′07″E
- Country: France
- Region: Grand Est
- Department: Ardennes
- Arrondissement: Charleville-Mézières
- Canton: Charleville-Mézières-1
- Intercommunality: CA Ardenne Métropole

Government
  - Mayor (2020–2026): Michel Normand
- Area^{1}: 4.94 km^{2} (1.91 sq mi)
- Elevation: 160 m (520 ft)
- Highest elevation: 215 m (705 ft)
- Lowest elevation: 145 m (476 ft)
- Population (2023): 232
  - Density: 47.0/km^{2} (122/sq mi)
- Time zone: UTC+01:00 (CET)
  - Summer (DST): UTC+02:00 (CEST)
- INSEE/Postal code: 08058 /08090
- ^{1} French Land Register data, which excludes lakes, ponds, glaciers > 1 km^{2} (0.386 sq mi or 247 acres) and river estuaries.

Belval (French pronunciation: [bɛlval]) is a commune in the Ardennes department in northern France.

== Geography ==
The Sormonne forms most of the commune's northern border.

== Population ==
Historical population
Year	Pop.	±% p.a.
1968	120	—
1975	107	−1.62%
1982	140	+3.91%
1990	156	+1.36%
1999	197	+2.63%
2007	222	+1.50%
2012	235	+1.14%
2017	222	−1.13%
2023	232	+0.74%
Source: INSEE

== See also ==
- Communes of the Ardennes department
