= Laval-Morency =

- Commune
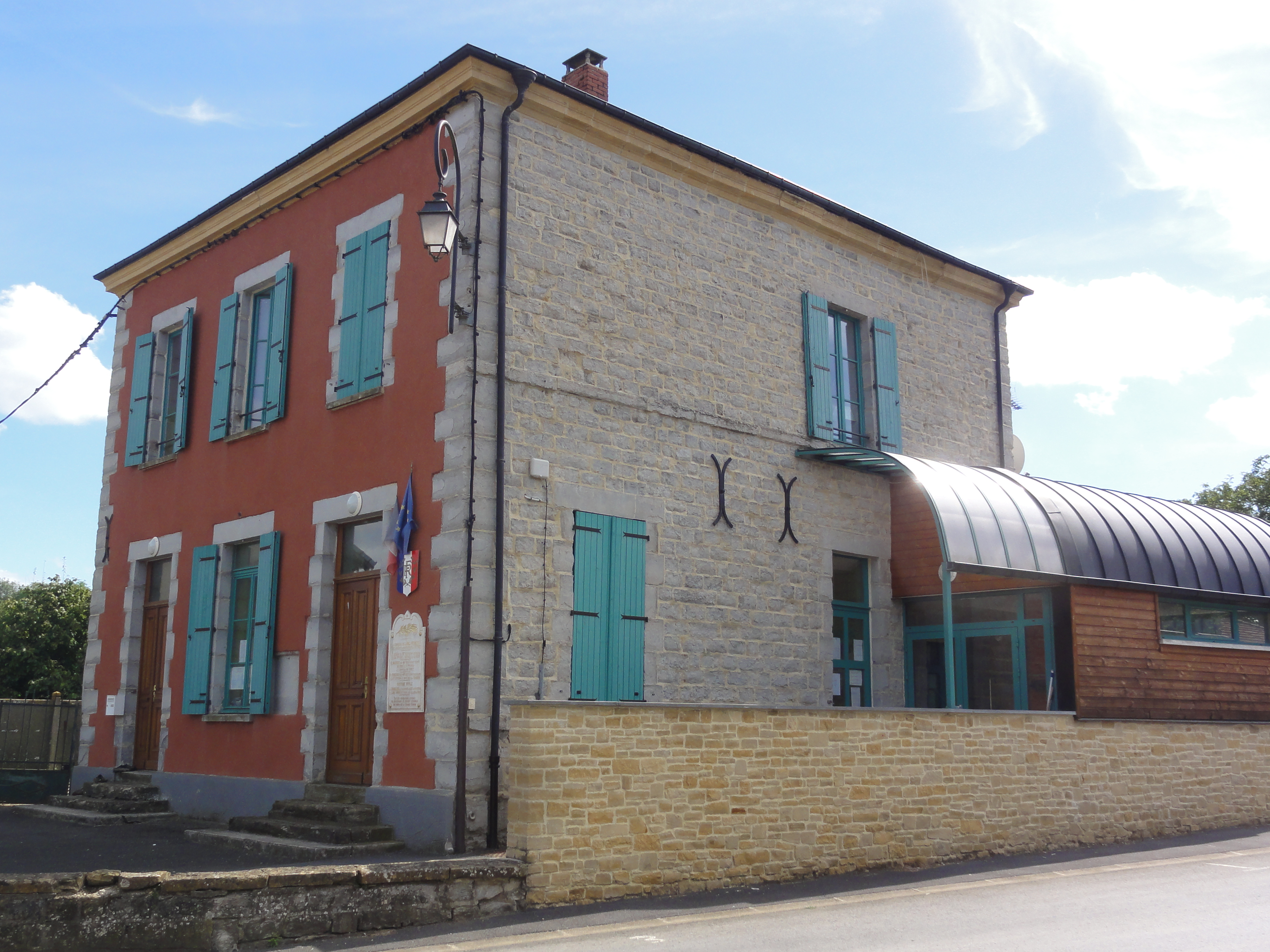
- Town hall

- Coat of arms
- Location of Laval-Morency
- Location within France Location within Grand Est
- Coordinates: 49°50′02″N 4°29′32″E
- Country: France
- Region: Grand Est
- Department: Ardennes
- Arrondissement: Charleville-Mézières
- Canton: Rocroi

Government
  - Mayor (2020–2026): Patrick Fonder
- Area^{1}: 4.28 km^{2} (1.65 sq mi)
- Elevation: 208 m (682 ft)
- Population (2023): 231
  - Density: 54.0/km^{2} (140/sq mi)
- Time zone: UTC+01:00 (CET)
  - Summer (DST): UTC+02:00 (CEST)
- INSEE/Postal code: 08249 /08150
- ^{1} French Land Register data, which excludes lakes, ponds, glaciers > 1 km^{2} (0.386 sq mi or 247 acres) and river estuaries.

Laval-Morency (French pronunciation: [laval mɔʁɑ̃si]) is a commune in the Ardennes department and Grand Est region of north-eastern France.

== Geography ==
The Sormonne flows through the commune and village of Laval-Morency.

== Population ==
Historical population
Year	Pop.	±% p.a.
1968	276	—
1975	226	−2.81%
1982	225	−0.06%
1990	224	−0.06%
1999	232	+0.39%
2007	243	+0.58%
2012	244	+0.08%
2017	243	−0.08%
2023	231	−0.84%
Source: INSEE

== See also ==
- Communes of the Ardennes department
