= Blombay =

- Commune
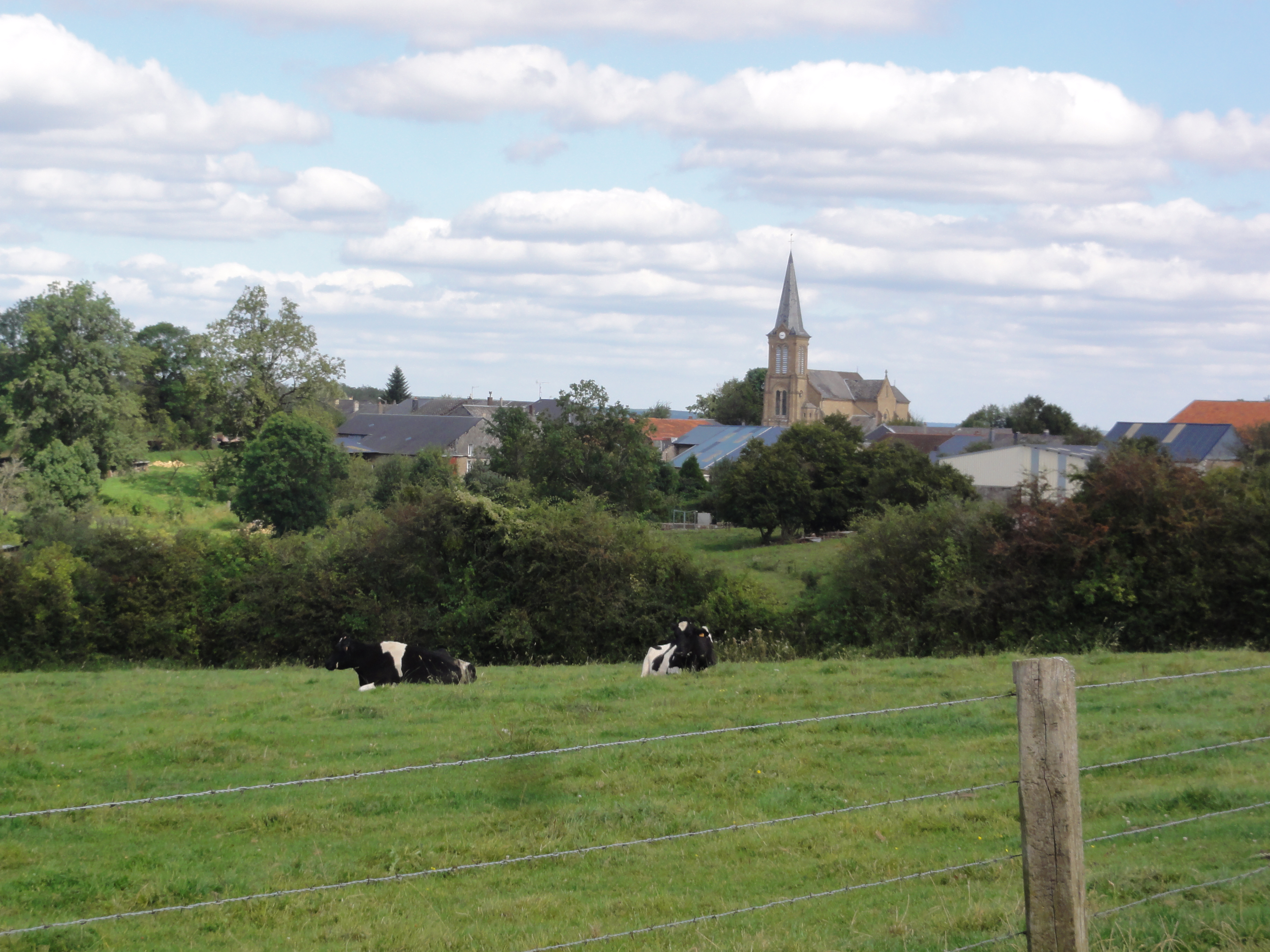
- A general view of Blombay

- Coat of arms
- Location of Blombay
- Location within France Location within Grand Est
- Coordinates: 49°49′28″N 4°27′11″E
- Country: France
- Region: Grand Est
- Department: Ardennes
- Arrondissement: Charleville-Mézières
- Canton: Rocroi
- Intercommunality: Vallées et Plateau d'Ardenne

Government
  - Mayor (2020–2026): Nathalie Tavernier
- Area^{1}: 9.47 km^{2} (3.66 sq mi)
- Elevation: 285 m (935 ft)
- Highest elevation: 301 m (988 ft)
- Lowest elevation: 202 m (663 ft)
- Population (2023): 128
  - Density: 13.5/km^{2} (35.0/sq mi)
- Time zone: UTC+01:00 (CET)
  - Summer (DST): UTC+02:00 (CEST)
- INSEE/Postal code: 08071 /08260
- ^{1} French Land Register data, which excludes lakes, ponds, glaciers > 1 km^{2} (0.386 sq mi or 247 acres) and river estuaries.

Blombay (French pronunciation: [blɔ̃bɛ]) is a commune located in the Ardennes department of northern France.

== Geography ==
The river Sormonne forms most part of the commune's northwestern border.

== Population ==
Historical population
Year	Pop.	±% p.a.
1968	136	—
1975	117	−2.13%
1982	112	−0.62%
1990	120	+0.87%
1999	91	−3.03%
2007	124	+3.94%
2012	127	+0.48%
2017	139	+1.82%
2023	128	−1.36%
Source: INSEE

== See also ==
- Communes of the Ardennes department
