= Remilly-les-Pothées =

- Commune
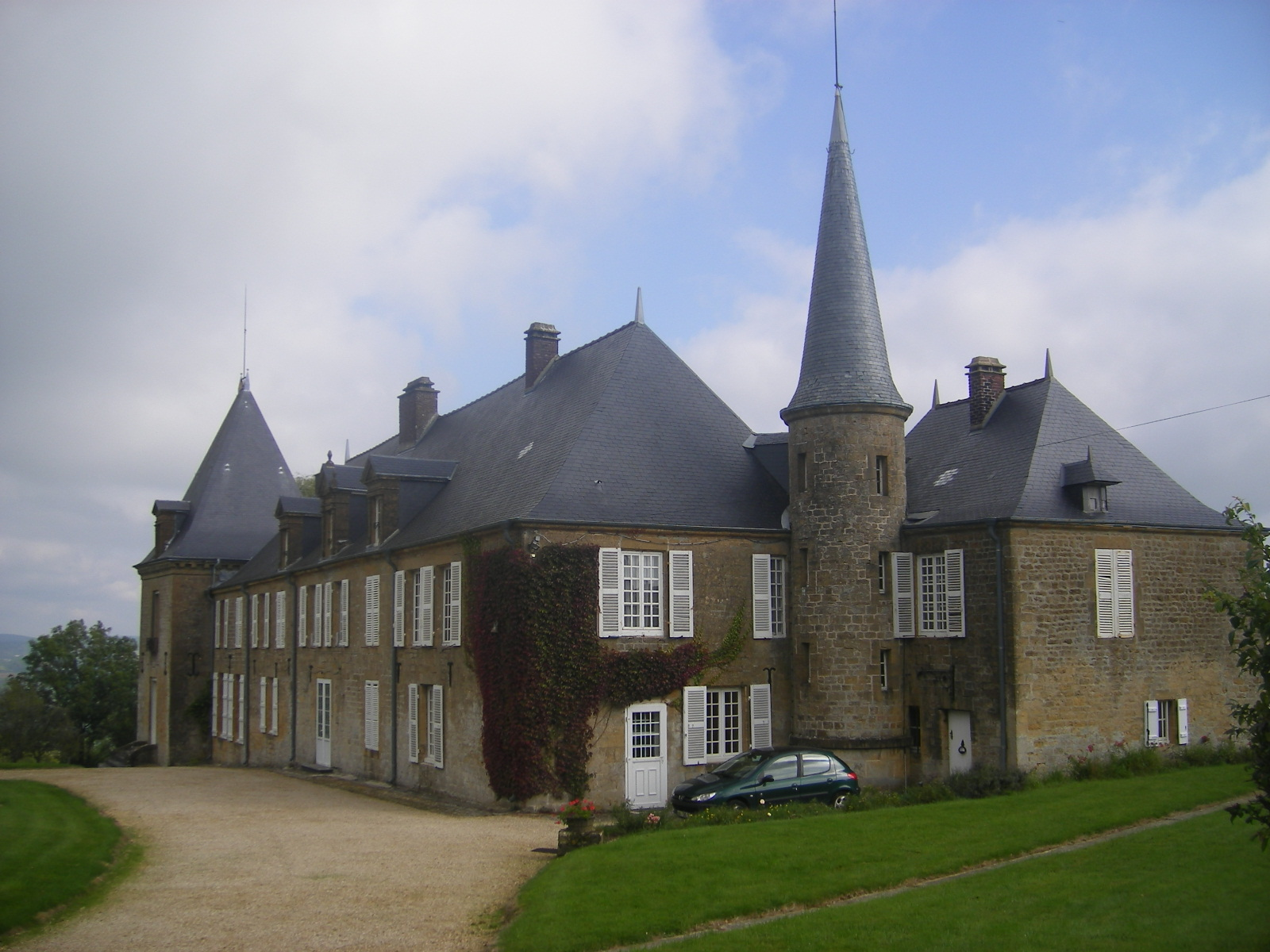
- The chateau of Hardoncelle in Remilly-les-Pothées

- Coat of arms
- Location of Remilly-les-Pothées
- Location within France Location within Grand Est
- Coordinates: 49°46′55″N 4°31′53″E
- Country: France
- Region: Grand Est
- Department: Ardennes
- Arrondissement: Charleville-Mézières
- Canton: Rocroi

Government
  - Mayor (2020–2026): Marc Bertrand
- Area^{1}: 9.92 km^{2} (3.83 sq mi)
- Elevation: 280 m (920 ft)
- Population (2023): 264
  - Density: 26.6/km^{2} (68.9/sq mi)
- Time zone: UTC+01:00 (CET)
  - Summer (DST): UTC+02:00 (CEST)
- INSEE/Postal code: 08358 /08150
- ^{1} French Land Register data, which excludes lakes, ponds, glaciers > 1 km^{2} (0.386 sq mi or 247 acres) and river estuaries.

Remilly-les-Pothées is a commune in the Ardennes department in northern France.

== Geography ==
The Sormonne, with the Audry, one of its tributaries, form the commune's northern border.

== Population ==
Historical population
Year	Pop.	±% p.a.
1968	199	—
1975	175	−1.82%
1982	193	+1.41%
1990	211	+1.12%
1999	216	+0.26%
2007	262	+2.44%
2012	242	−1.58%
2017	254	+0.97%
2023	264	+0.65%
Source: INSEE

== See also ==
- Communes of the Ardennes department
