= Le Châtelet-sur-Sormonne =

- Commune
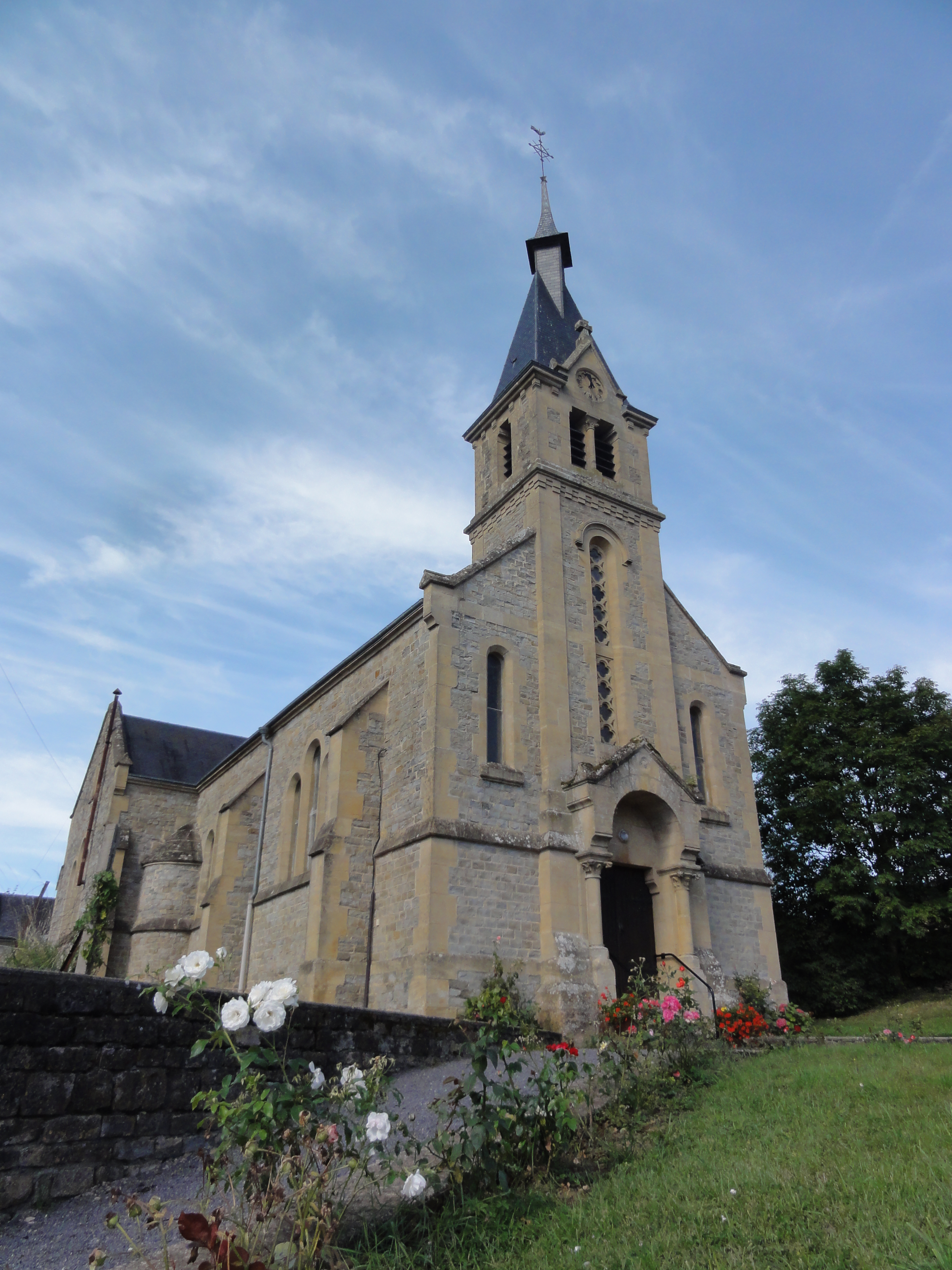
- The church in Le Châtelet-sur-Sormonne

- Coat of arms
- Location of Le Châtelet-sur-Sormonne
- Location within France Location within Grand Est
- Coordinates: 49°49′41″N 4°31′18″E
- Country: France
- Region: Grand Est
- Department: Ardennes
- Arrondissement: Charleville-Mézières
- Canton: Rocroi

Government
  - Mayor (2020–2026): Marie-Christine Tessari
- Area^{1}: 9.85 km^{2} (3.80 sq mi)
- Elevation: 185 m (607 ft)
- Population (2023): 174
  - Density: 17.7/km^{2} (45.8/sq mi)
- Time zone: UTC+01:00 (CET)
  - Summer (DST): UTC+02:00 (CEST)
- INSEE/Postal code: 08110 /08150
- ^{1} French Land Register data, which excludes lakes, ponds, glaciers > 1 km^{2} (0.386 sq mi or 247 acres) and river estuaries.

Le Châtelet-sur-Sormonne (French pronunciation: [lə ʃatlɛ syʁ sɔʁmɔn], literally Le Châtelet on Sormonne, before 1959: Le Châtelet) is a commune in the Ardennes department in northern France.

== Geography ==
The river Sormonne flows through the commune and crosses the village of Châtelet-sur-Sormonne.

== Population ==
Historical population
Year	Pop.	±% p.a.
1968	187	—
1975	148	−3.29%
1982	163	+1.39%
1990	200	+2.59%
1999	195	−0.28%
2007	165	−2.07%
2012	167	+0.24%
2017	160	−0.85%
2023	174	+1.41%
Source: INSEE

== See also ==
- Communes of the Ardennes department
