= Taillette =

- Commune
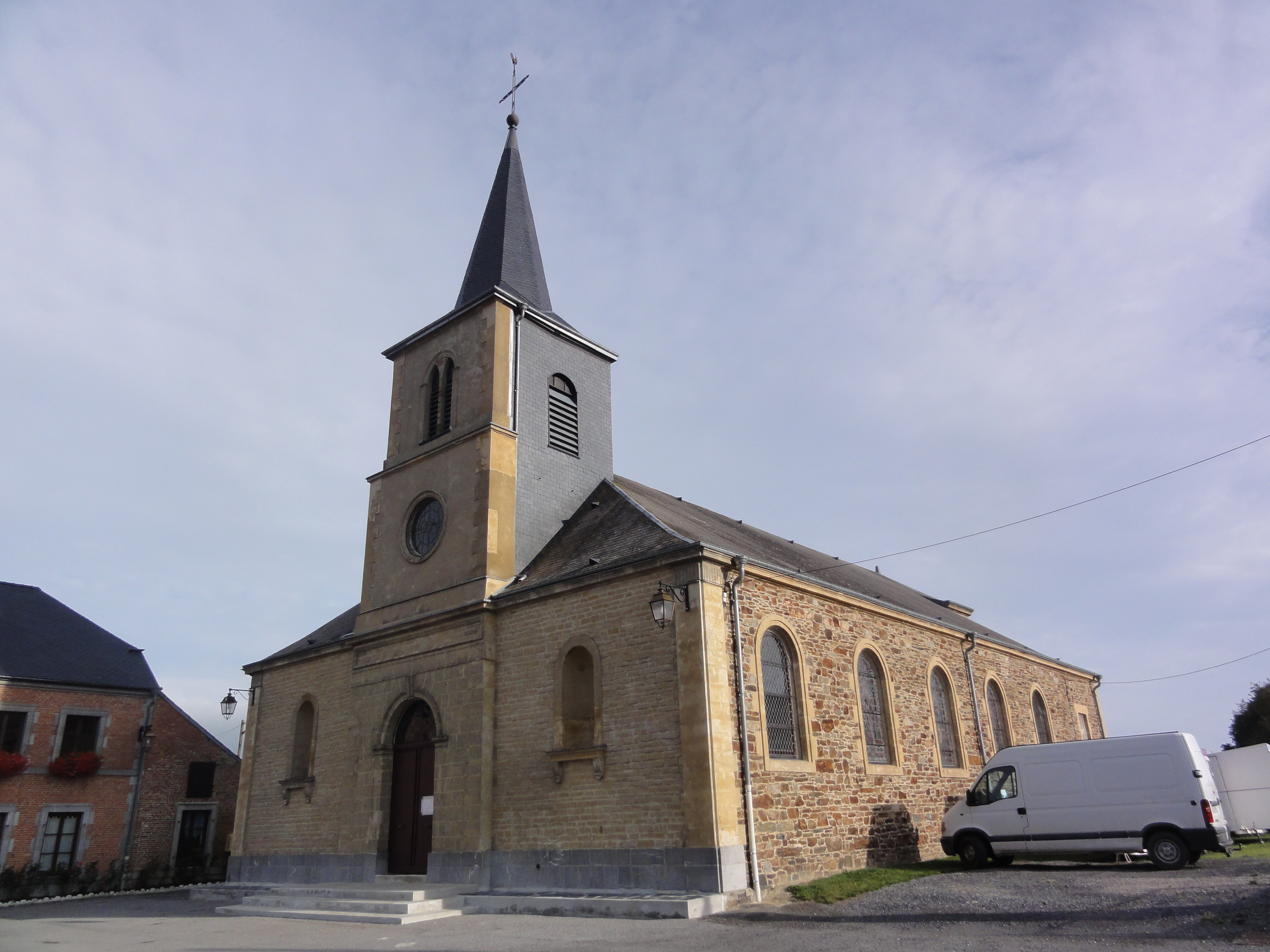
- The church in Taillette

- Coat of arms
- Location of Taillette
- Location within France Location within Grand Est
- Coordinates: 49°55′53″N 4°29′14″E
- Country: France
- Region: Grand Est
- Department: Ardennes
- Arrondissement: Charleville-Mézières
- Canton: Rocroi
- Intercommunality: Vallées et Plateau d'Ardenne

Government
  - Mayor (2020–2026): Christian Michaux
- Area^{1}: 15.25 km^{2} (5.89 sq mi)
- Elevation: 370 m (1,210 ft)
- Population (2023): 407
  - Density: 26.7/km^{2} (69.1/sq mi)
- Time zone: UTC+01:00 (CET)
  - Summer (DST): UTC+02:00 (CEST)
- INSEE/Postal code: 08436 /08230
- ^{1} French Land Register data, which excludes lakes, ponds, glaciers > 1 km^{2} (0.386 sq mi or 247 acres) and river estuaries.

Taillette (French pronunciation: [tajɛt]) is a commune in the Ardennes department in northern France.

== Geography ==
The Sormonne has its source in the commune.

== Population ==
Historical population
Year	Pop.	±% p.a.
1968	316	—
1975	270	−2.22%
1982	240	−1.67%
1990	262	+1.10%
1999	314	+2.03%
2007	364	+1.86%
2012	385	+1.13%
2017	402	+0.87%
2023	407	+0.21%
Source: INSEE

== See also ==
- Communes of the Ardennes department
