= Flaignes-Havys =

- Commune
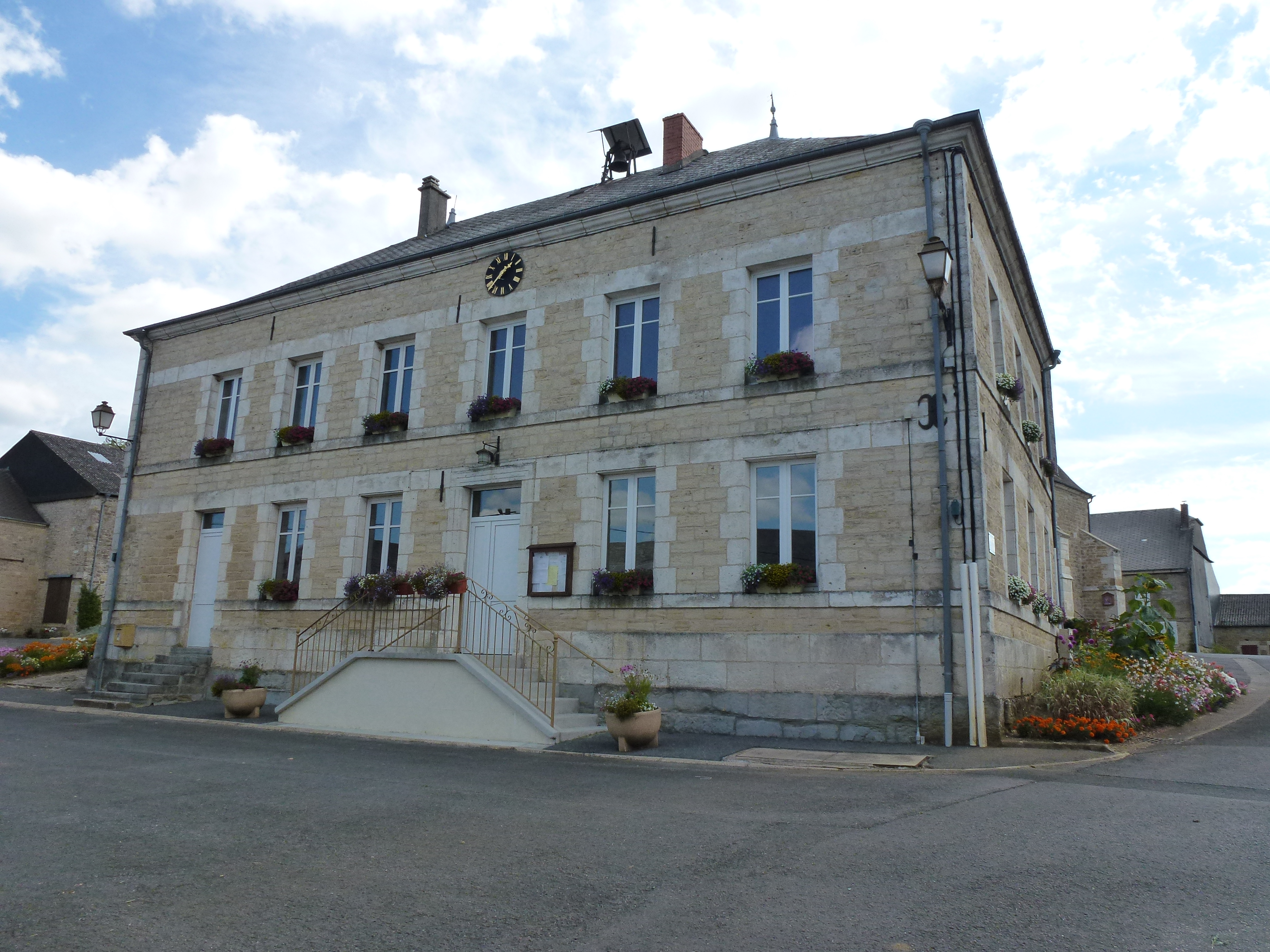
- The town hall in Flaignes

- Coat of arms
- Location of Flaignes-Havys
- Location within France Location within Grand Est
- Coordinates: 49°49′10″N 4°24′08″E
- Country: France
- Region: Grand Est
- Department: Ardennes
- Arrondissement: Charleville-Mézières
- Canton: Signy-l'Abbaye
- Intercommunality: Ardennes Thiérache

Government
  - Mayor (2020–2026): Franck Robquin
- Area^{1}: 13.7 km^{2} (5.3 sq mi)
- Elevation: 2,452 m (8,045 ft)
- Population (2023): 89
  - Density: 6.5/km^{2} (17/sq mi)
- Time zone: UTC+01:00 (CET)
  - Summer (DST): UTC+02:00 (CEST)
- INSEE/Postal code: 08169 /08260
- ^{1} French Land Register data, which excludes lakes, ponds, glaciers > 1 km^{2} (0.386 sq mi or 247 acres) and river estuaries.

Flaignes-Havys is a commune in the Ardennes department and Grand Est region of north-eastern France.

== Geography ==
The river Sormonne flows east through the northern part of the commune.

== Population ==
Historical population
Year	Pop.	±% p.a.
1968	182	—
1975	167	−1.22%
1982	160	−0.61%
1990	133	−2.28%
1999	132	−0.08%
2007	121	−1.08%
2012	114	−1.18%
2017	121	+1.20%
2023	89	−4.99%
Source: INSEE

== See also ==
- Communes of the Ardennes department
