= Neuville-lez-Beaulieu =

- Commune
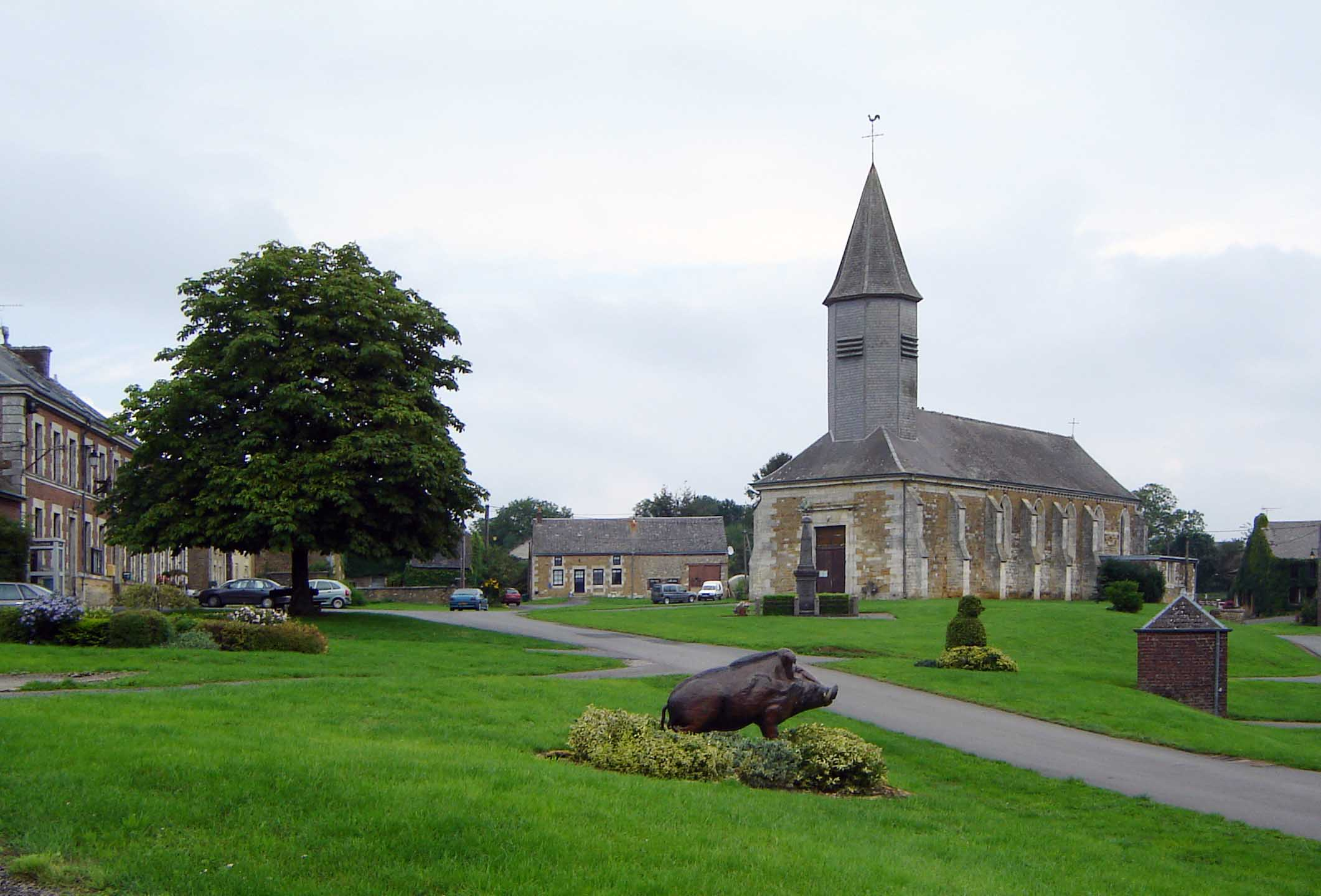
- The church in La Neuville-aux-Tourneurs

- Coat of arms
- Location of Neuville-lez-Beaulieu
- Location within France Location within Grand Est
- Coordinates: 49°52′01″N 4°19′36″E
- Country: France
- Region: Grand Est
- Department: Ardennes
- Arrondissement: Charleville-Mézières
- Canton: Rocroi
- Intercommunality: Ardennes Thiérache

Government
  - Mayor (2020–2026): Nicolas Carpentier
- Area^{1}: 35.92 km^{2} (13.87 sq mi)
- Elevation: 250 m (820 ft)
- Highest elevation: 280 m (920 ft)
- Lowest elevation: 220 m (720 ft)
- Population (2023): 320
  - Density: 8.9/km^{2} (23/sq mi)
- Time zone: UTC+01:00 (CET)
  - Summer (DST): UTC+02:00 (CEST)
- INSEE/Postal code: 08319 /08380
- ^{1} French Land Register data, which excludes lakes, ponds, glaciers > 1 km^{2} (0.386 sq mi or 247 acres) and river estuaries.

Neuville-lez-Beaulieu (French pronunciation: [nøvil lɛ boljø]) is a commune in the Ardennes department and Grand Est region of north-eastern France.

== Geography ==
The Sormonne flows through the commune and forms part of its eastern border.

== Population ==
Historical population
Year	Pop.	±% p.a.
1968	459	—
1975	374	−2.88%
1982	360	−0.54%
1990	298	−2.33%
1999	265	−1.30%
2007	318	+2.31%
2012	347	+1.76%
2017	335	−0.70%
2023	320	−0.76%
Source: INSEE

== See also ==
- Communes of the Ardennes department
