= Warcq, Ardennes =

Warcq
- Commune
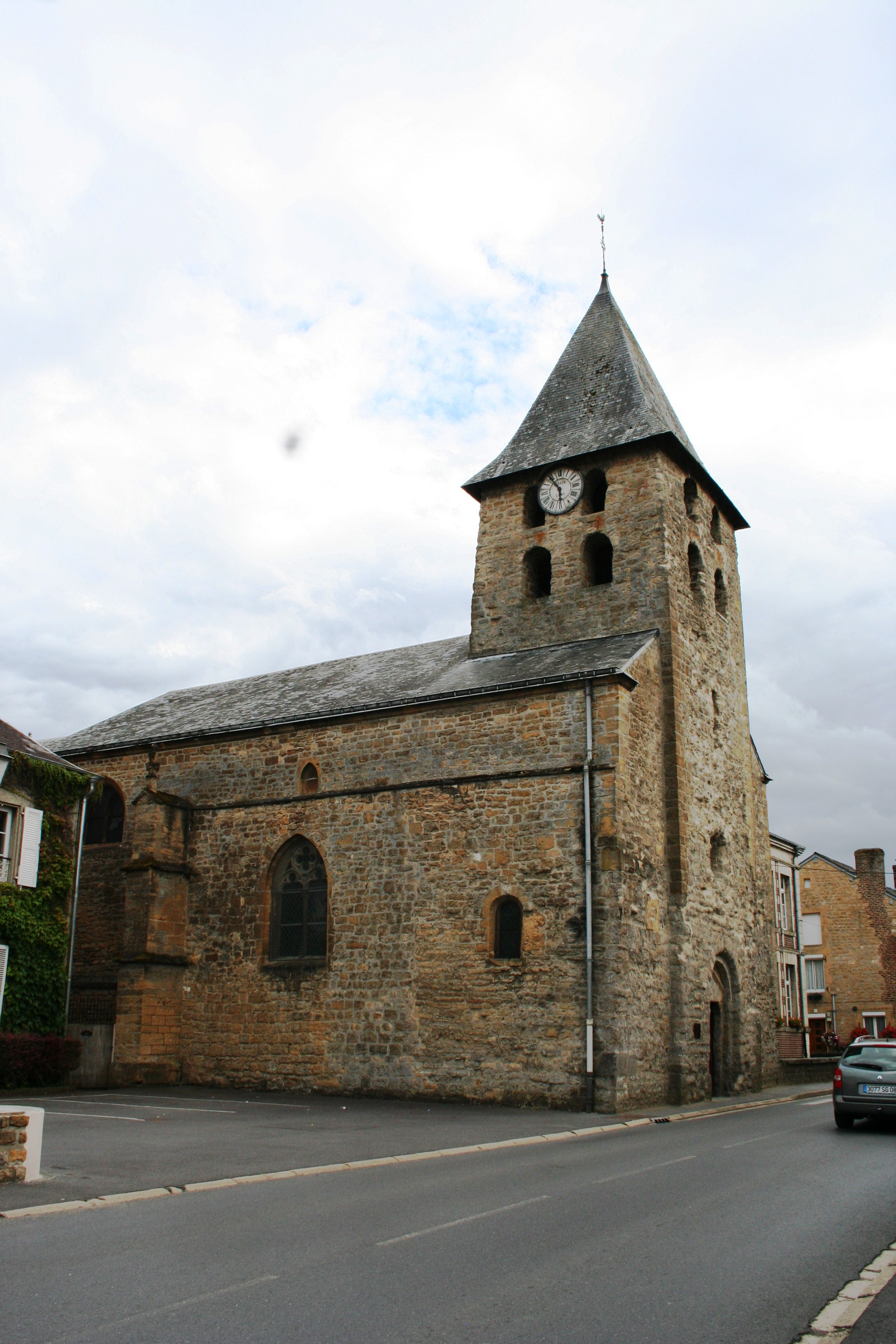
- The church in Warcq

- Coat of arms
- Location of Warcq
- Location within France Location within Grand Est
- Coordinates: 49°46′14″N 4°40′53″E
- Country: France
- Region: Grand Est
- Department: Ardennes
- Arrondissement: Charleville-Mézières
- Canton: Charleville-Mézières-1
- Intercommunality: Ardenne Métropole

Government
  - Mayor (2020–2026): Marie-Annick Pierquin
- Area^{1}: 9.19 km^{2} (3.55 sq mi)
- Elevation: 153 m (502 ft)
- Population (2023): 1,282
  - Density: 139/km^{2} (361/sq mi)
- Time zone: UTC+01:00 (CET)
  - Summer (DST): UTC+02:00 (CEST)
- INSEE/Postal code: 08497 /08000
- ^{1} French Land Register data, which excludes lakes, ponds, glaciers > 1 km^{2} (0.386 sq mi or 247 acres) and river estuaries.

Warcq (French pronunciation: [waʁk]) is a commune in the Ardennes département in northern France.

== Geography ==
The Sormonne flows through the commune before flowing into the Meuse.

== Population ==
Historical population
Year	Pop.	±% p.a.
1968	1,490	—
1975	1,418	−0.71%
1982	1,376	−0.43%
1990	1,528	+1.32%
1999	1,449	−0.59%
2007	1,328	−1.08%
2012	1,312	−0.24%
2017	1,275	−0.57%
2023	1,282	+0.09%
Source: INSEE

== See also ==
- Communes of the Ardennes department
