= Prix-lès-Mézières =

- Commune
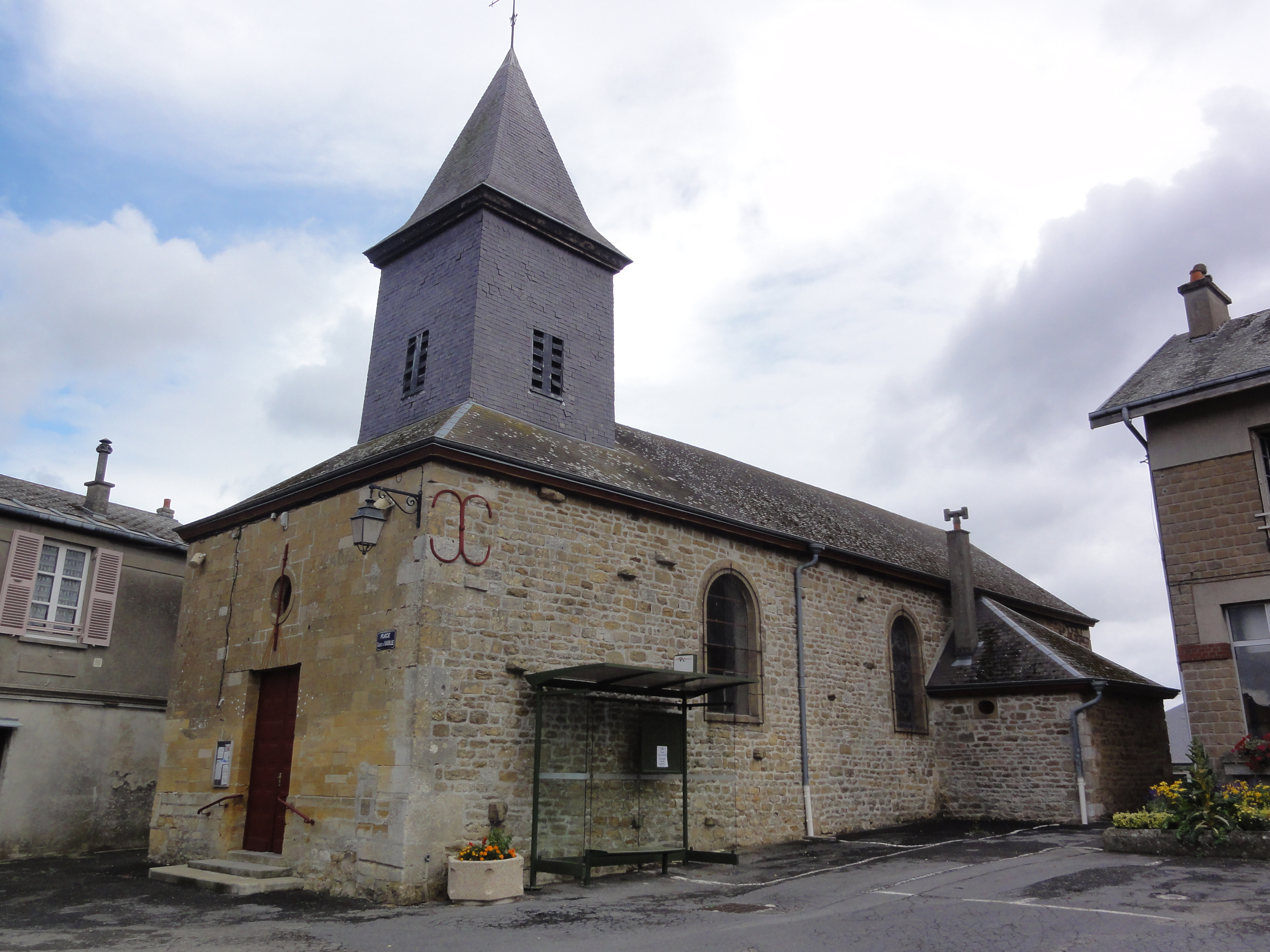
- The church in Prix-lès-Mézières

- Coat of arms
- Location of Prix-lès-Mézières
- Location within France Location within Grand Est
- Coordinates: 49°45′20″N 4°41′27″E
- Country: France
- Region: Grand Est
- Department: Ardennes
- Arrondissement: Charleville-Mézières
- Canton: Charleville-Mézières-1
- Intercommunality: CA Ardenne Métropole

Government
  - Mayor (2020–2026): Bruno Dedion
- Area^{1}: 5.08 km^{2} (1.96 sq mi)
- Elevation: 149 m (489 ft)
- Population (2023): 1,396
  - Density: 275/km^{2} (712/sq mi)
- Time zone: UTC+01:00 (CET)
  - Summer (DST): UTC+02:00 (CEST)
- INSEE/Postal code: 08346 /08000
- ^{1} French Land Register data, which excludes lakes, ponds, glaciers > 1 km^{2} (0.386 sq mi or 247 acres) and river estuaries.

Prix-lès-Mézières (French pronunciation: [pʁi lɛ mezjɛʁ], literally Prix near Mézières) is a commune in the Ardennes department in northern France.

== Population ==
Historical population
Year	Pop.	±% p.a.
1968	892	—
1975	974	+1.26%
1982	1,381	+5.11%
1990	1,472	+0.80%
1999	1,426	−0.35%
2007	1,309	−1.06%
2012	1,387	+1.16%
2017	1,340	−0.69%
2023	1,396	+0.68%
Source: INSEE

== See also ==
- Communes of the Ardennes department
