= Sormonne (river) =

River in France

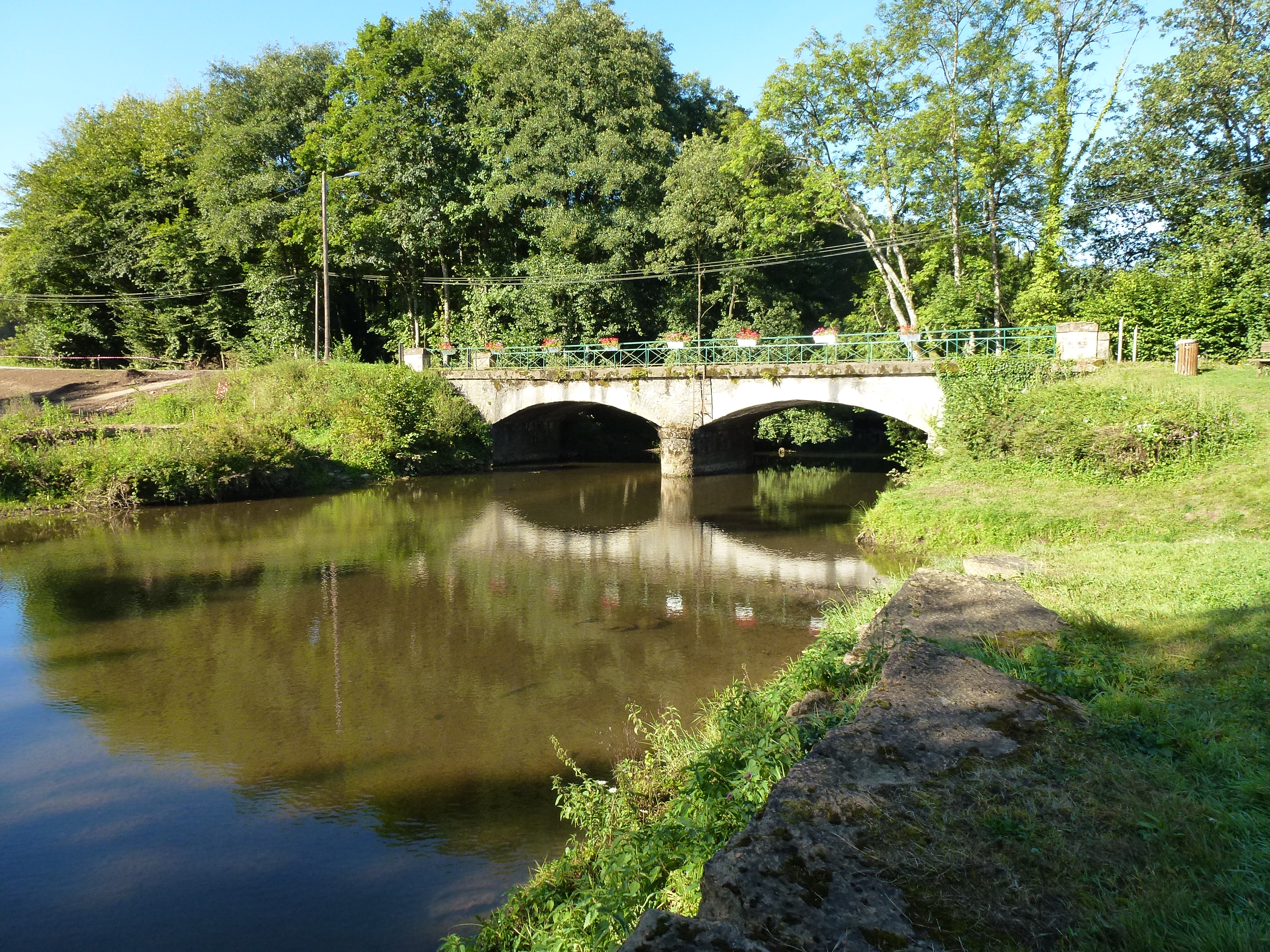

- Location within France Location within Grand Est

Location
- Country: France

Physical characteristics
- Source
  - location: Taillette
  - coordinates: 49°54′48″N 04°26′56″E
  - elevation: 350 m (1,150 ft)
- Mouth: Meuse
  - coordinates: 49°46′18″N 04°41′04″E
  - elevation: 140 m (460 ft)
- Length: 56.4 km (35.0 mi)
- Basin size: 411 km^{2} (159 sq mi)
- Discharge
  - average: 6.36 m^{3}/s (225 cu ft/s)

Basin features
- Progression: Meuse→ North Sea

The Sormonne (French pronunciation: [sɔʁmɔn]) is a 56.4 km (35.0 mi) long river in the Ardennes département, northeastern France. Its source is at Taillette, near Rocroi. It flows generally southeast. It is a left tributary of the Meuse into which it flows at Warcq, near Charleville-Mézières.

== Communes along its course ==
This list is ordered from source to mouth: Taillette, Éteignières, Regniowez, Neuville-lez-Beaulieu, Auvillers-les-Forges, Girondelle, Flaignes-Havys, Marby, Étalle, Blombay, Chilly, Laval-Morency, Le Châtelet-sur-Sormonne, Murtin-et-Bogny, Sormonne, Remilly-les-Pothées, Ham-les-Moines, Haudrecy, Cliron, Tournes, Belval, Damouzy, Warcq
