= Regniowez =

- Commune
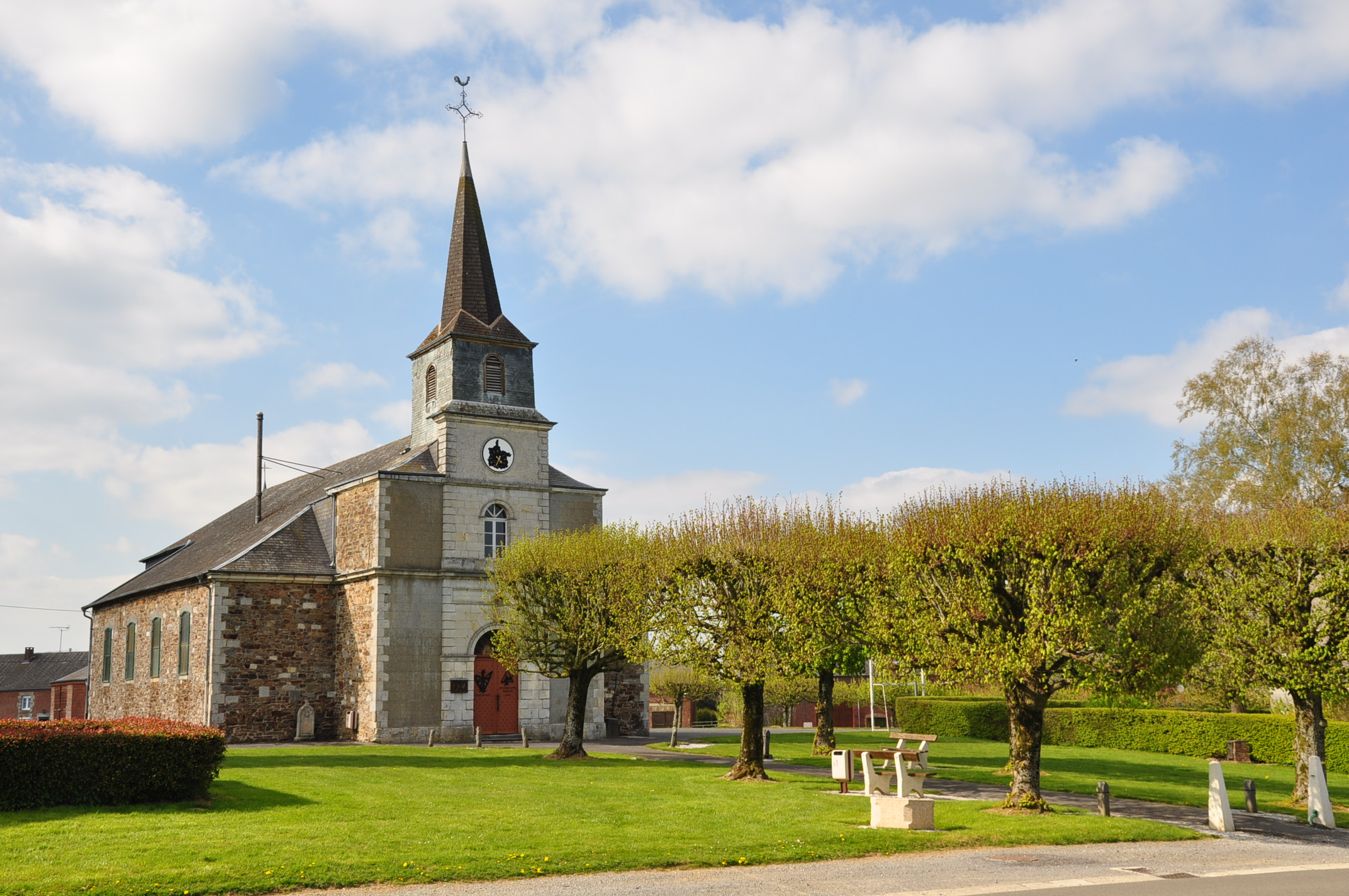
- The church in Regniowez

- Coat of arms
- Location of Regniowez
- Location within France Location within Grand Est
- Coordinates: 49°56′20″N 4°25′52″E
- Country: France
- Region: Grand Est
- Department: Ardennes
- Arrondissement: Charleville-Mézières
- Canton: Rocroi

Government
  - Mayor (2020–2026): Jean-Yves Lagneaux
- Area^{1}: 18.27 km^{2} (7.05 sq mi)
- Elevation: 350 m (1,150 ft)
- Population (2023): 369
  - Density: 20.2/km^{2} (52.3/sq mi)
- Time zone: UTC+01:00 (CET)
  - Summer (DST): UTC+02:00 (CEST)
- INSEE/Postal code: 08355 /08230
- ^{1} French Land Register data, which excludes lakes, ponds, glaciers > 1 km^{2} (0.386 sq mi or 247 acres) and river estuaries.

Regniowez is a commune in the Ardennes department in northern France.

== Geography ==
The Sormonne forms most of the commune's southern border. Couvin and Chimay, two Belgian municipalities, form its northern border.

== Population ==
Historical population
Year	Pop.	±% p.a.
1968	344	—
1975	355	+0.45%
1982	357	+0.08%
1990	366	+0.31%
1999	396	+0.88%
2007	387	−0.29%
2012	394	+0.36%
2017	391	−0.15%
2023	369	−0.96%
Source: INSEE

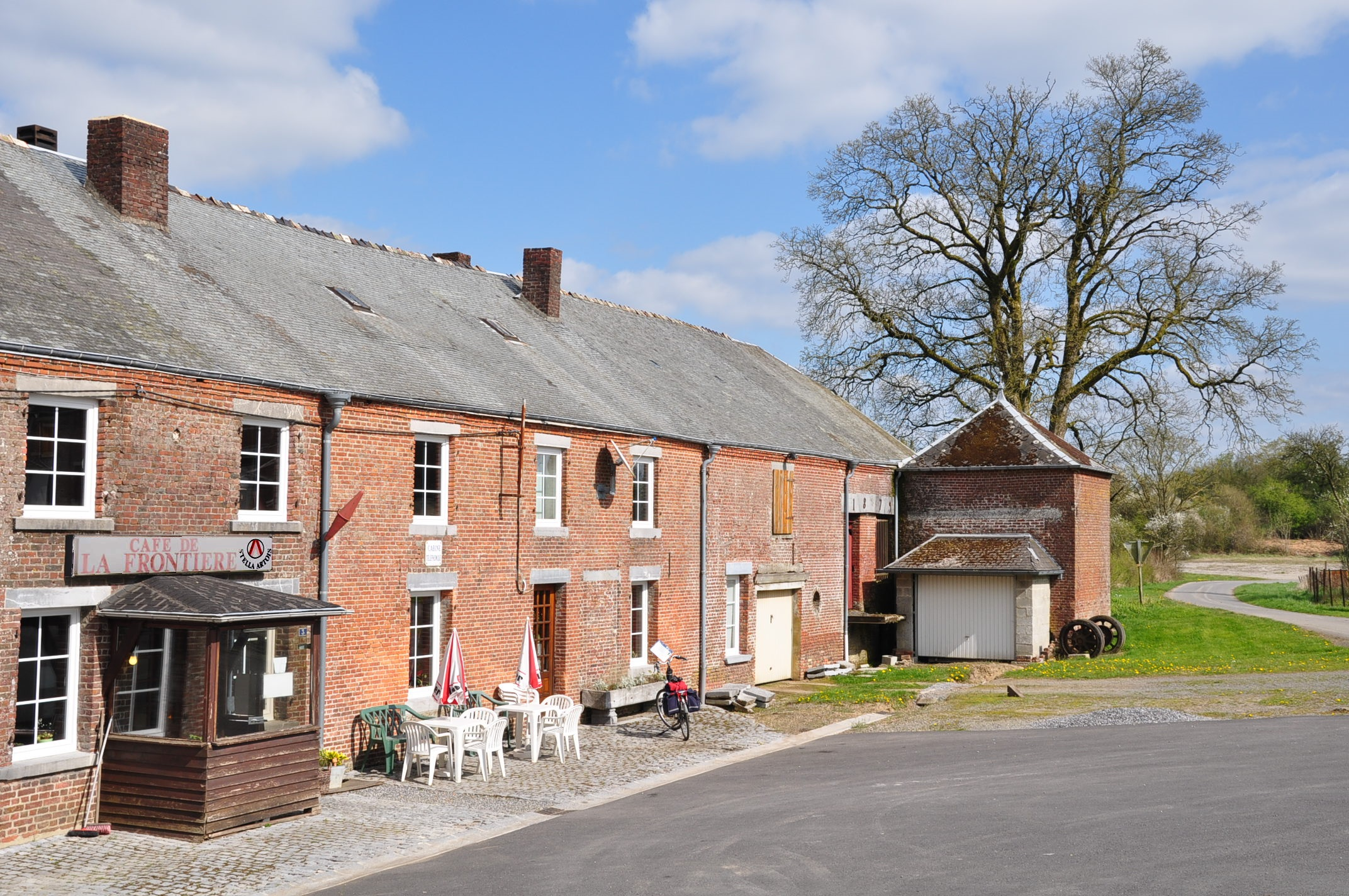
Café de la Frontière

== See also ==
- Communes of the Ardennes department
