= Sormonne =

- Commune
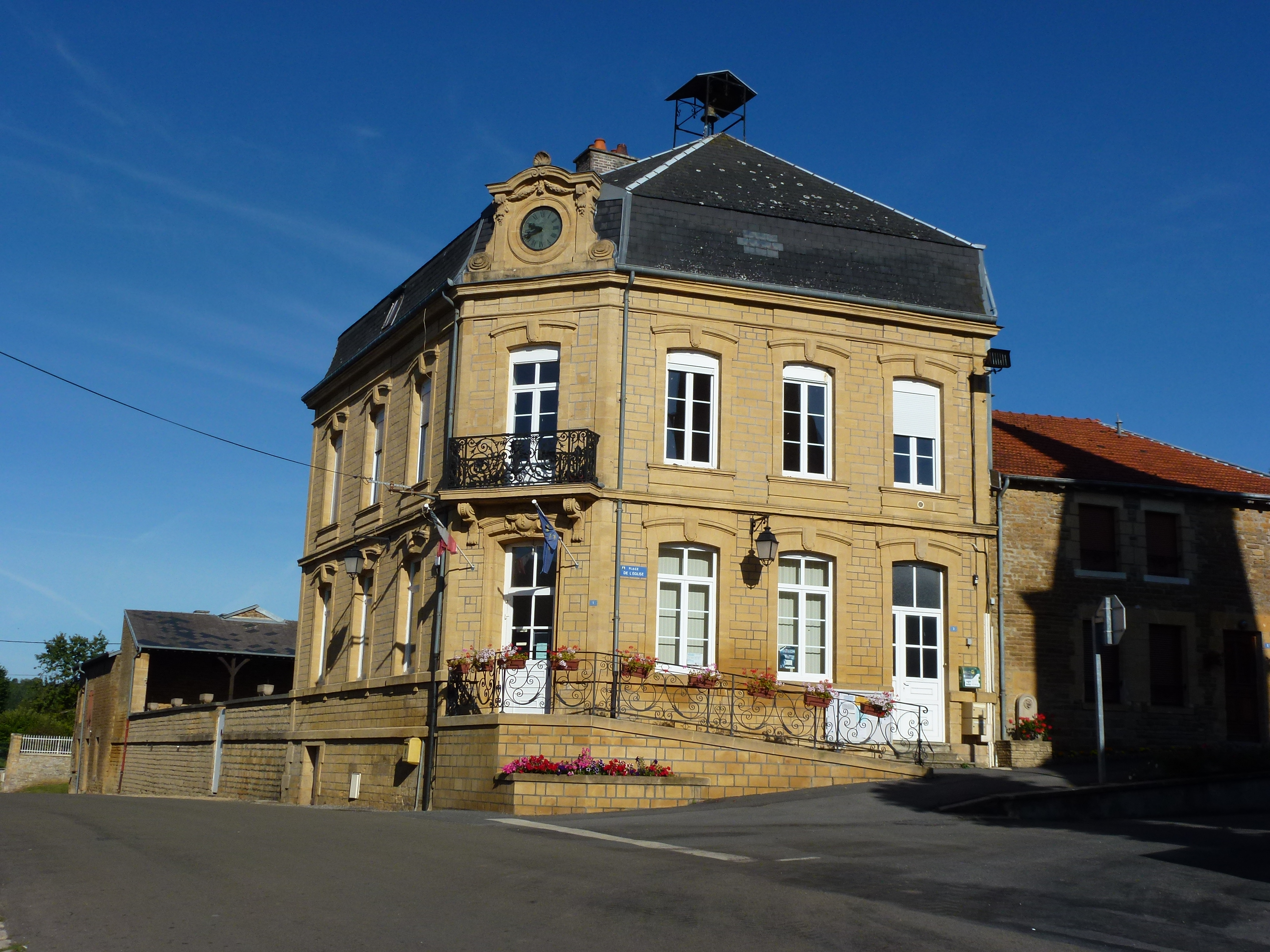
- The town hall in Sormonne

- Coat of arms
- Location of Sormonne
- Location within France Location within Grand Est
- Coordinates: 49°48′41″N 4°34′02″E
- Country: France
- Region: Grand Est
- Department: Ardennes
- Arrondissement: Charleville-Mézières
- Canton: Rocroi

Government
  - Mayor (2020–2026): François Deneux
- Area^{1}: 4.75 km^{2} (1.83 sq mi)
- Elevation: 168 m (551 ft)
- Population (2023): 529
  - Density: 111/km^{2} (288/sq mi)
- Time zone: UTC+01:00 (CET)
  - Summer (DST): UTC+02:00 (CEST)
- INSEE/Postal code: 08429 /08150
- ^{1} French Land Register data, which excludes lakes, ponds, glaciers > 1 km^{2} (0.386 sq mi or 247 acres) and river estuaries.

Sormonne (French pronunciation: [sɔʁmɔn]) is a commune in the Ardennes department and Grand Est region of north-eastern France.

== Geography ==
The river Sormonne, a left tributary of the Meuse, flows through the commune.

== Population ==
Historical population
| Year | Pop. | ±% p.a. |
|---|---|---|
| 1968 | 223 | — |
| 1975 | 231 | +0.50% |
| 1982 | 397 | +8.04% |
| 1990 | 531 | +3.70% |
| 1999 | 542 | +0.23% |
| 2007 | 565 | +0.52% |
| 2012 | 558 | −0.25% |
| 2017 | 544 | −0.51% |
| 2023 | 529 | −0.46% |
Source: INSEE

== See also ==
- Communes of the Ardennes department
