= Tournes =

- Commune
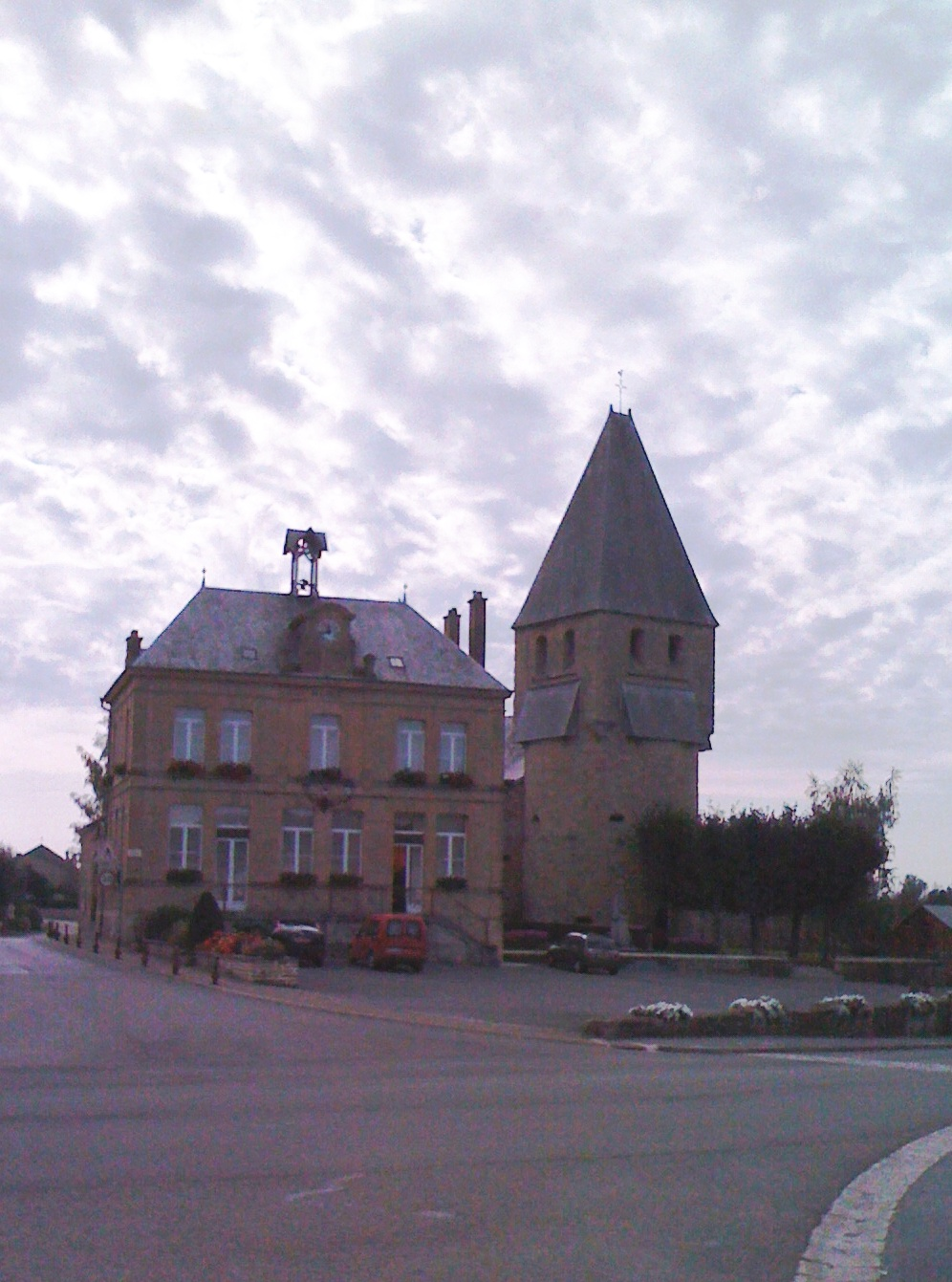
- The church in Tournes

- Coat of arms
- Location of Tournes
- Location within France Location within Grand Est
- Coordinates: 49°47′51″N 4°38′16″E
- Country: France
- Region: Grand Est
- Department: Ardennes
- Arrondissement: Charleville-Mézières
- Canton: Charleville-Mézières-1
- Intercommunality: CA Ardenne Métropole

Government
  - Mayor (2024–2026): Aline Haplik
- Area^{1}: 8.26 km^{2} (3.19 sq mi)
- Elevation: 152 m (499 ft)
- Highest elevation: 180 m (590 ft)
- Lowest elevation: 140 m (460 ft)
- Population (2023): 1,055
  - Density: 128/km^{2} (331/sq mi)
- Time zone: UTC+01:00 (CET)
  - Summer (DST): UTC+02:00 (CEST)
- INSEE/Postal code: 08457 /08090
- ^{1} French Land Register data, which excludes lakes, ponds, glaciers > 1 km^{2} (0.386 sq mi or 247 acres) and river estuaries.

Tournes (French pronunciation: [tuʁn]) is a commune in the Ardennes department in northern France.

== Population ==
Historical population
Year	Pop.	±% p.a.
1968	509	—
1975	836	+7.35%
1982	904	+1.12%
1990	1,073	+2.17%
1999	1,075	+0.02%
2007	1,080	+0.06%
2012	1,018	−1.18%
2017	1,076	+1.11%
2023	1,055	−0.33%
Source: INSEE

== Geography ==
The river Sormonne forms most of the commune's southern border.

== See also ==
- Communes of the Ardennes department
