= Fontenelle, Aisne =

Fontenelle
- Commune
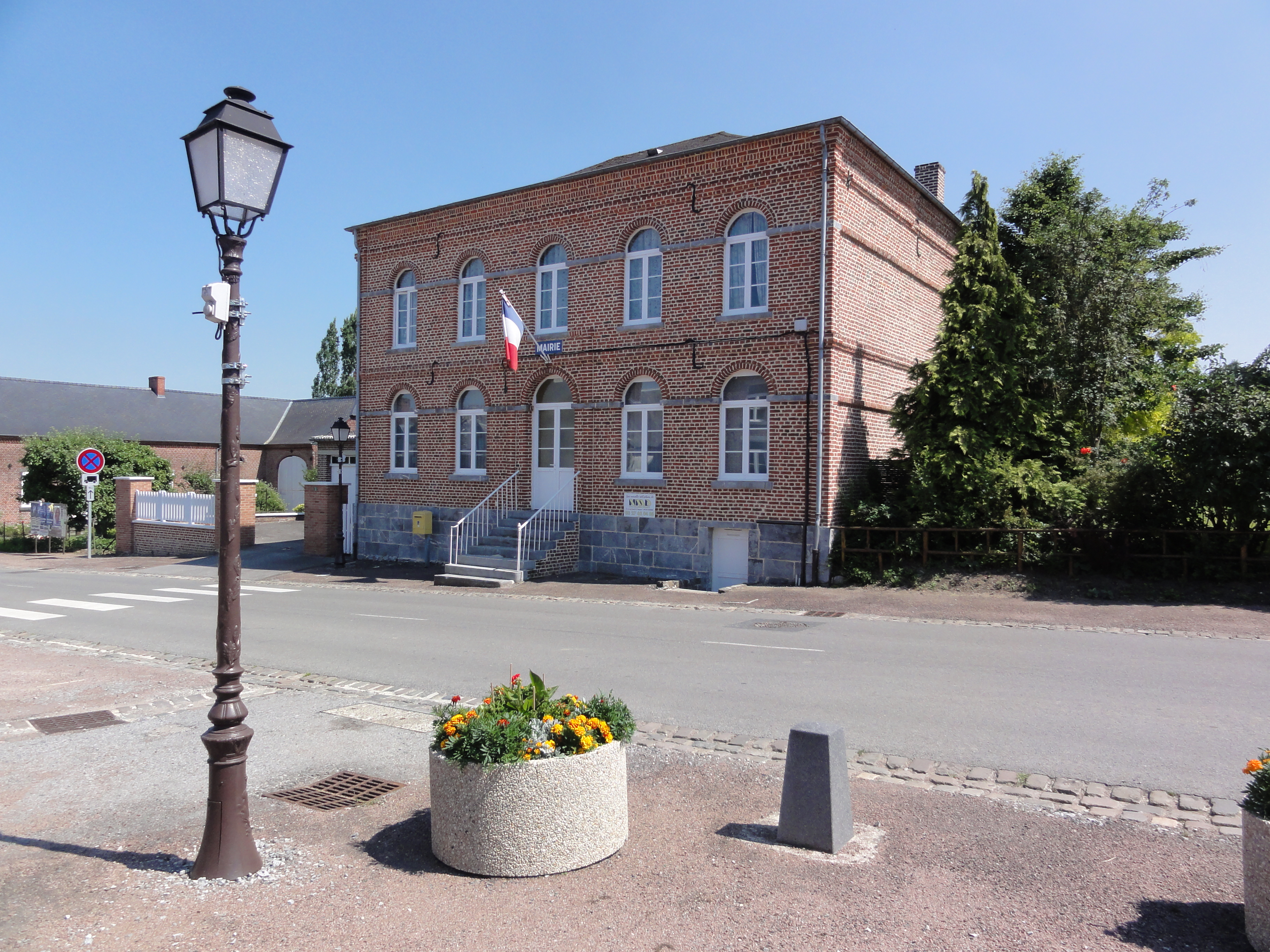
- The town hall of Fontenelle

- Coat of arms
- Location of Fontenelle
- Location within France Location within Hauts-de-France
- Coordinates: 50°01′53″N 3°51′59″E
- Country: France
- Region: Hauts-de-France
- Department: Aisne
- Arrondissement: Vervins
- Canton: Vervins
- Intercommunality: Thiérache du Centre

Government
  - Mayor (2026–32): Emmanuel Devaux
- Area^{1}: 10.47 km^{2} (4.04 sq mi)
- Elevation: 210 m (690 ft)
- Highest elevation: 223 m (732 ft)
- Lowest elevation: 172 m (564 ft)
- Population (2023): 280
  - Density: 27/km^{2} (69/sq mi)
- Time zone: UTC+01:00 (CET)
  - Summer (DST): UTC+02:00 (CEST)
- INSEE/Postal code: 02324 /02170
- ^{1} French Land Register data, which excludes lakes, ponds, glaciers > 1 km^{2} (0.386 sq mi or 247 acres) and river estuaries.

Fontenelle is a commune in the Aisne department in Hauts-de-France in northern France.

== Population ==
Historical population
Year	Pop.	±% p.a.
1968	436	—
1975	404	−1.08%
1982	317	−3.41%
1990	265	−2.21%
1999	272	+0.29%
2007	281	+0.41%
2012	278	−0.21%
2017	277	−0.07%
2023	280	+0.18%
Source: INSEE

== Geography ==
Fontenelle is located in the Thiérache region of northern France, near the border with the Nord department. It is about 12 km (7.5 mi) southwest of Avesnes-sur-Helpe and 22 km (14 mi) northwest of Hirson.

Fontenelle borders Floyon to the north and east, Papleux to the southeast, Le Nouvion-en-Thiérache to the southwest and west, and Beaurepaire-sur-Sambre and Cartignies to the northwest.

== See also ==
- Communes of the Aisne department
