= Champlin, Ardennes =

Champlin
- Commune
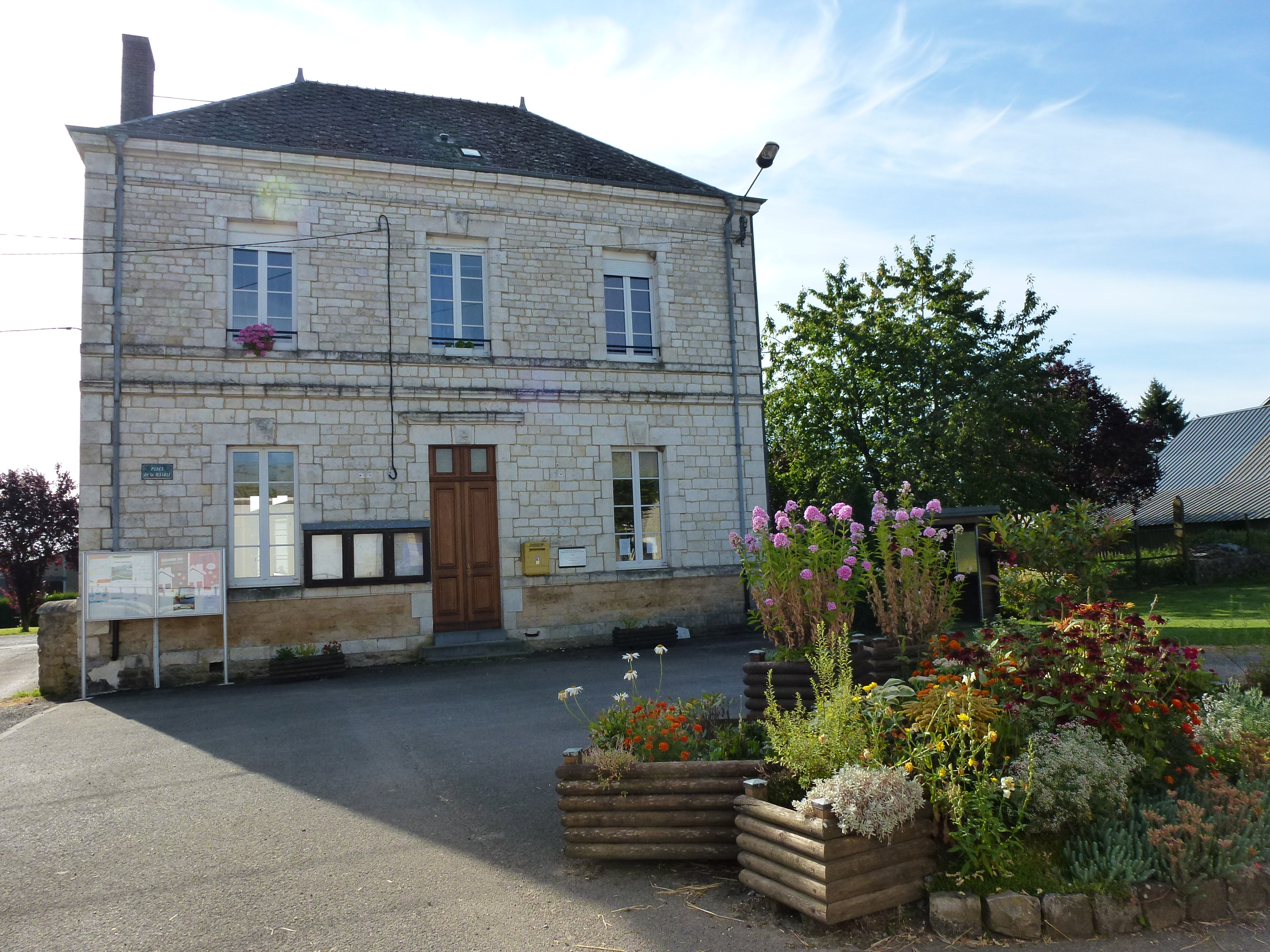
- Town hall

- Coat of arms
- Location of Champlin
- Location within France Location within Grand Est
- Coordinates: 49°50′27″N 4°19′52″E
- Country: France
- Region: Grand Est
- Department: Ardennes
- Arrondissement: Charleville-Mézières
- Canton: Signy-l'Abbaye

Government
  - Mayor (2020–2026): Pascal Saingery
- Area^{1}: 5.9 km^{2} (2.3 sq mi)
- Elevation: 265 m (869 ft)
- Population (2023): 73
  - Density: 12/km^{2} (32/sq mi)
- Time zone: UTC+01:00 (CET)
  - Summer (DST): UTC+02:00 (CEST)
- INSEE/Postal code: 08100 /08260
- ^{1} French Land Register data, which excludes lakes, ponds, glaciers > 1 km^{2} (0.386 sq mi or 247 acres) and river estuaries.

Champlin (French pronunciation: [ʃɑ̃plɛ̃]) is a commune in the Ardennes department in northern France.

== Population ==
Historical population
| Year | Pop. | ±% p.a. |
|---|---|---|
| 1968 | 106 | — |
| 1975 | 73 | −5.19% |
| 1982 | 75 | +0.39% |
| 1990 | 74 | −0.17% |
| 1999 | 80 | +0.87% |
| 2007 | 73 | −1.14% |
| 2012 | 79 | +1.59% |
| 2017 | 71 | −2.11% |
| 2023 | 73 | +0.46% |
Source: INSEE

== See also ==
- Communes of the Ardennes department
