= Girondelle =

- Commune
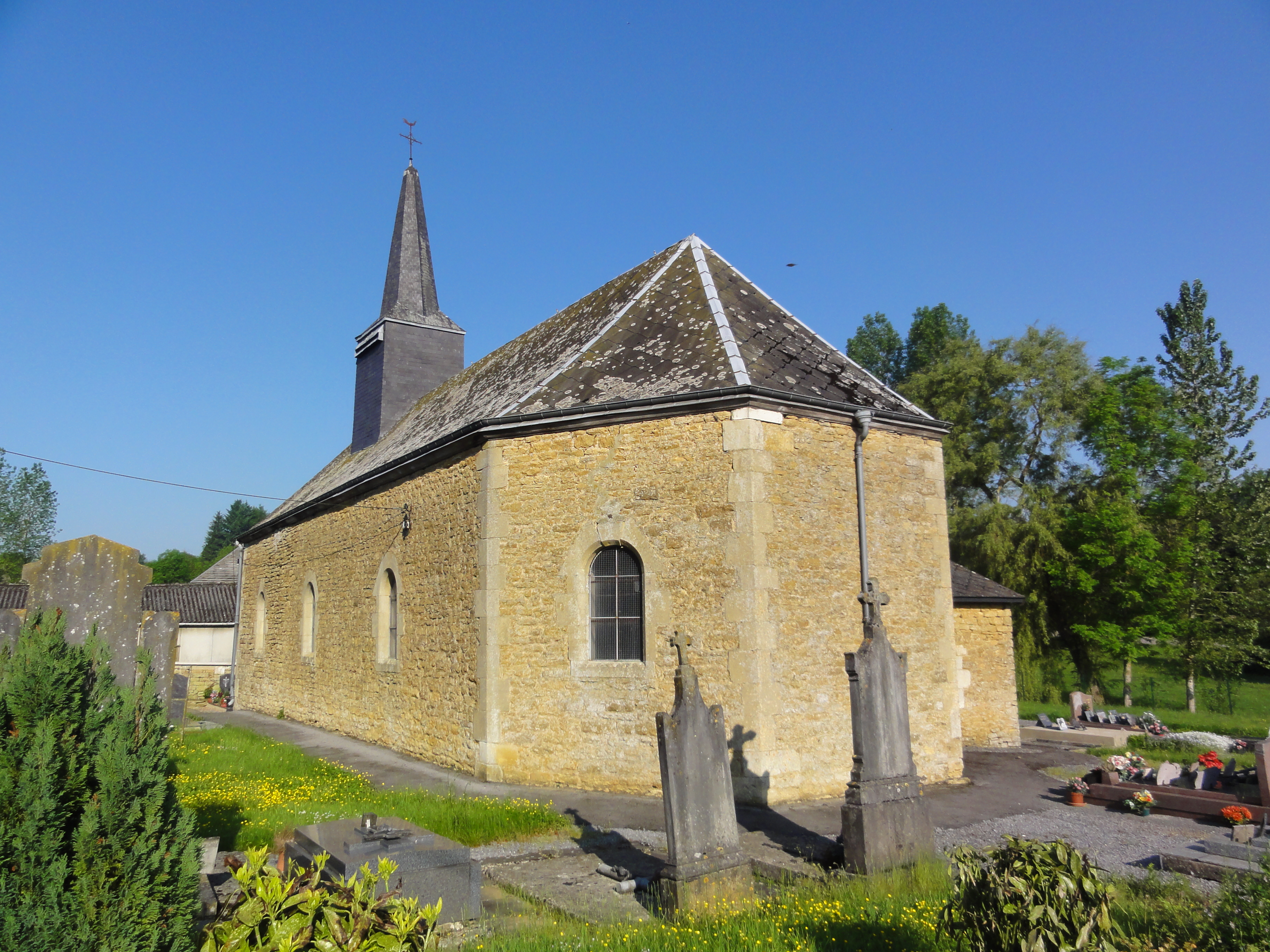
- The church in Girondelle
- Location of Girondelle
- Location within France Location within Grand Est
- Coordinates: 49°50′46″N 4°23′25″E
- Country: France
- Region: Grand Est
- Department: Ardennes
- Arrondissement: Charleville-Mézières
- Canton: Signy-l'Abbaye
- Intercommunality: Ardennes Thiérache

Government
  - Mayor (2021–2026): Jérôme Rouet
- Area^{1}: 11.53 km^{2} (4.45 sq mi)
- Elevation: 230 m (750 ft)
- Population (2023): 153
  - Density: 13.3/km^{2} (34.4/sq mi)
- Time zone: UTC+01:00 (CET)
  - Summer (DST): UTC+02:00 (CEST)
- INSEE/Postal code: 08189 /08260
- ^{1} French Land Register data, which excludes lakes, ponds, glaciers > 1 km^{2} (0.386 sq mi or 247 acres) and river estuaries.

Girondelle (French pronunciation: [ʒiʁɔ̃dɛl]) is a commune in the Ardennes department and Grand Est region of north-eastern France.

== Geography ==
The river Sormonne flows through the commune.

== Population ==
Historical population
Year	Pop.	±% p.a.
1968	171	—
1975	153	−1.58%
1982	151	−0.19%
1990	127	−2.14%
1999	139	+1.01%
2007	146	+0.62%
2012	147	+0.14%
2017	153	+0.80%
2023	153	+0.00%
Source: INSEE

== See also ==
- Communes of the Ardennes department
