= Éteignières =

- Commune
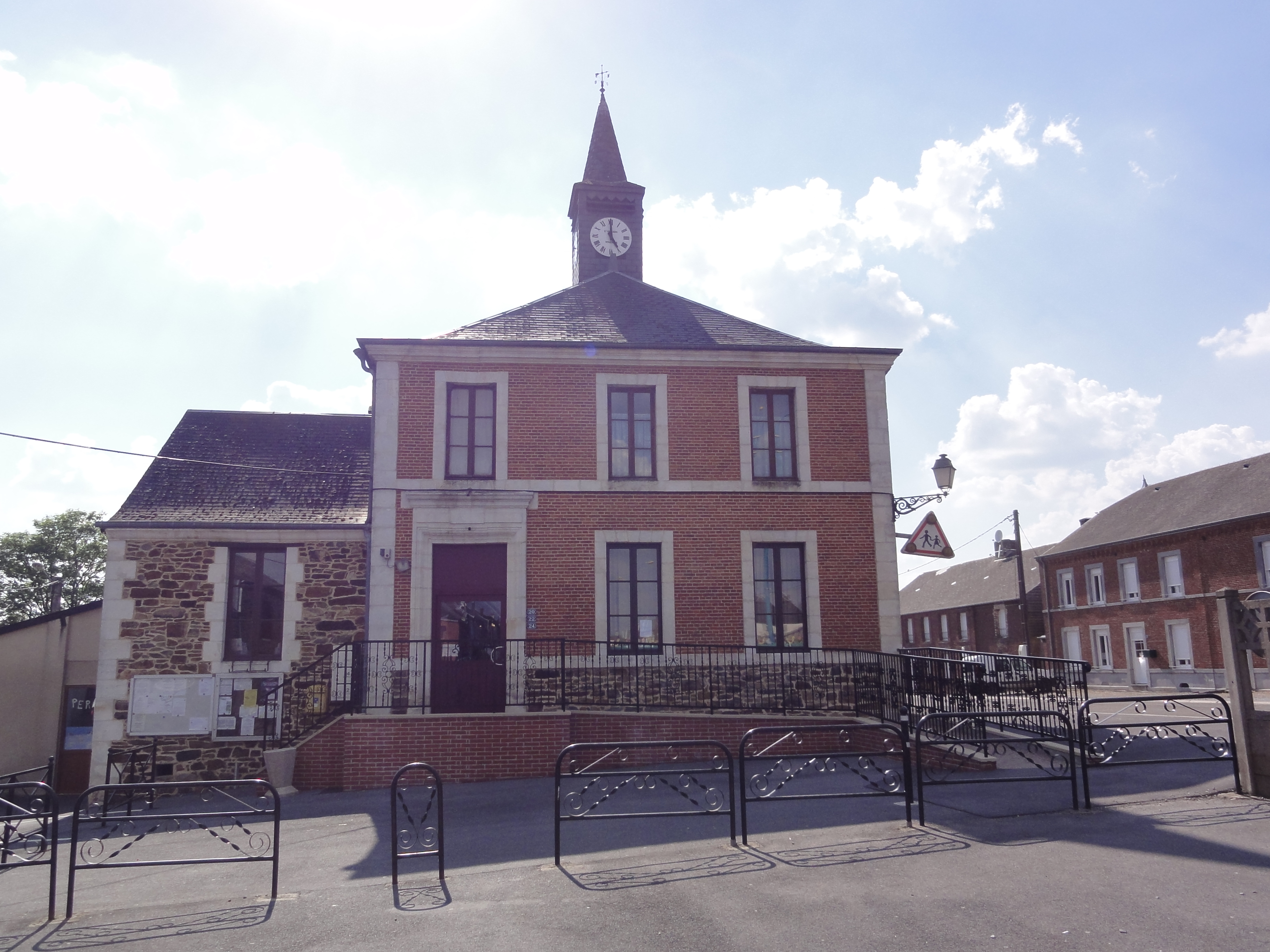
- School

- Coat of arms
- Location of Éteignières
- Location within France Location within Grand Est
- Coordinates: 49°53′13″N 4°23′27″E
- Country: France
- Region: Grand Est
- Department: Ardennes
- Arrondissement: Charleville-Mézières
- Canton: Rocroi

Government
  - Mayor (2020–2026): Jean-Pierre Jarlot
- Area^{1}: 11.79 km^{2} (4.55 sq mi)
- Elevation: 261 m (856 ft)
- Population (2023): 465
  - Density: 39.4/km^{2} (102/sq mi)
- Time zone: UTC+01:00 (CET)
  - Summer (DST): UTC+02:00 (CEST)
- INSEE/Postal code: 08156 /08260
- ^{1} French Land Register data, which excludes lakes, ponds, glaciers > 1 km^{2} (0.386 sq mi or 247 acres) and river estuaries.

Éteignières (French pronunciation: [etɛɲɛʁ]) is a commune in the Ardennes department in the Grand Est region in northern France.

== Geography ==
The river Sormonne forms most of the commune's northern border.

== Population ==
Historical population
Year	Pop.	±% p.a.
1968	454	—
1975	409	−1.48%
1982	385	−0.86%
1990	355	−1.01%
1999	406	+1.50%
2007	457	+1.49%
2012	518	+2.54%
2017	516	−0.08%
2023	465	−1.72%
Source: INSEE

== See also ==
- Communes of the Ardennes department
