= Étalle, Ardennes =

Étalle
- Commune
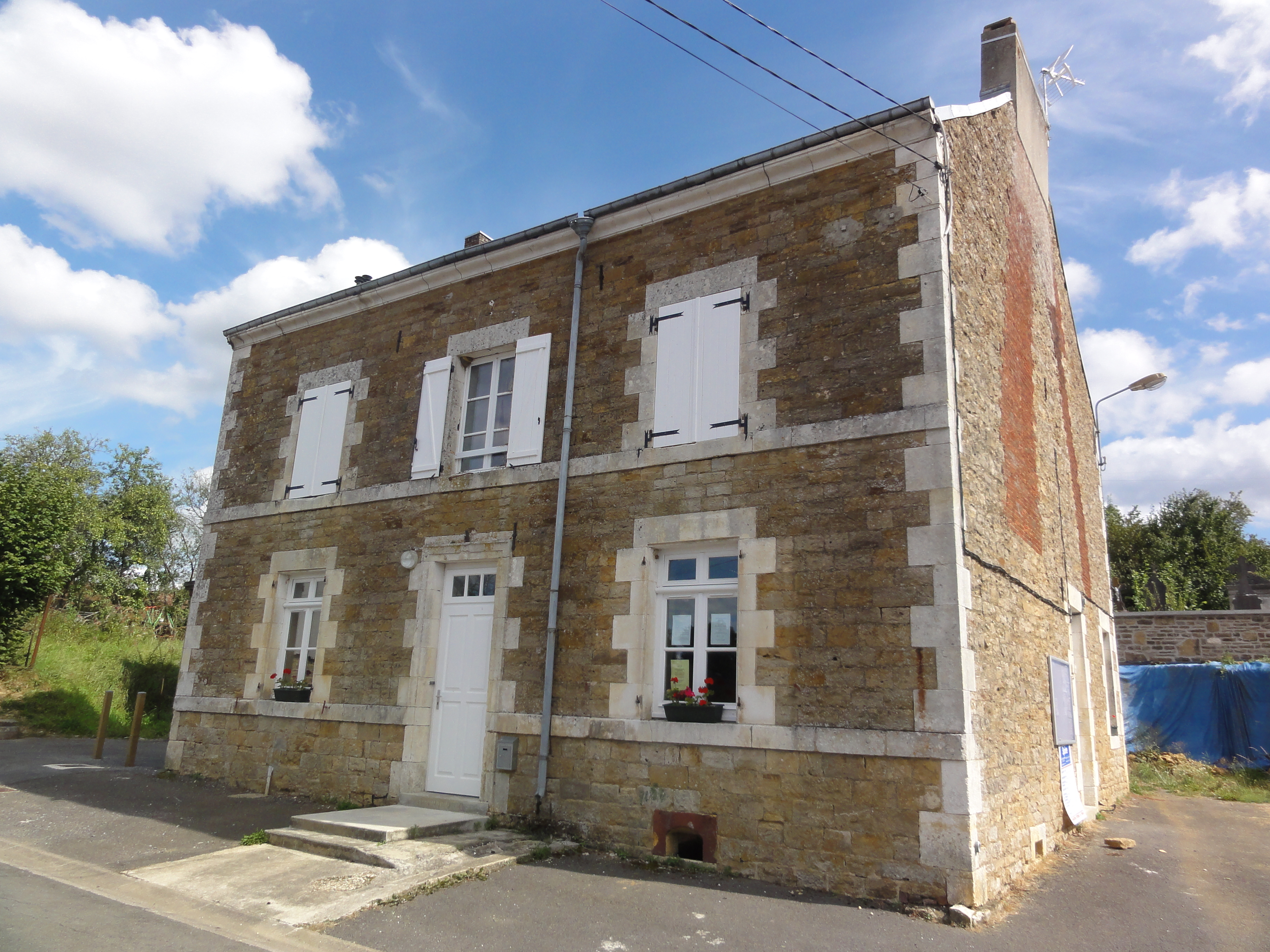
- The town hall in Étalle

- Coat of arms
- Location of Étalle
- Location within France Location within Grand Est
- Coordinates: 49°50′53″N 4°26′38″E
- Country: France
- Region: Grand Est
- Department: Ardennes
- Arrondissement: Charleville-Mézières
- Canton: Rocroi

Government
  - Mayor (2020–2026): Jean-Louis Swartvagher
- Area^{1}: 4.44 km^{2} (1.71 sq mi)
- Elevation: 225 m (738 ft)
- Population (2023): 94
  - Density: 21/km^{2} (55/sq mi)
- Time zone: UTC+01:00 (CET)
  - Summer (DST): UTC+02:00 (CEST)
- INSEE/Postal code: 08155 /08260
- ^{1} French Land Register data, which excludes lakes, ponds, glaciers > 1 km^{2} (0.386 sq mi or 247 acres) and river estuaries.

Étalle (French pronunciation: [etal]) is a commune in the Ardennes department in the Grand Est region in northern France.

== Geography ==
The river Sormonne flows through the commune and forms part of its southern border.

== Population ==
Historical population
Year	Pop.	±% p.a.
1968	115	—
1975	105	−1.29%
1982	89	−2.33%
1990	81	−1.17%
1999	71	−1.45%
2007	89	+2.86%
2012	98	+1.95%
2017	103	+1.00%
2023	94	−1.51%
Source: INSEE

== See also ==
- Communes of the Ardennes department
