= Mont-Saint-Martin =

Mont-Saint-Martin may refer to the following places in France:

- Mont-Saint-Martin, Aisne, a commune in the department of Aisne
- Mont-Saint-Martin, Ardennes, a commune in the department of Ardennes
- Mont-Saint-Martin, Isère, a commune in the department of Isère
- Mont-Saint-Martin, Meurthe-et-Moselle, a commune in the department of Meurthe-et-Moselle
