= Saint-Pierre-à-Arnes =

- Commune
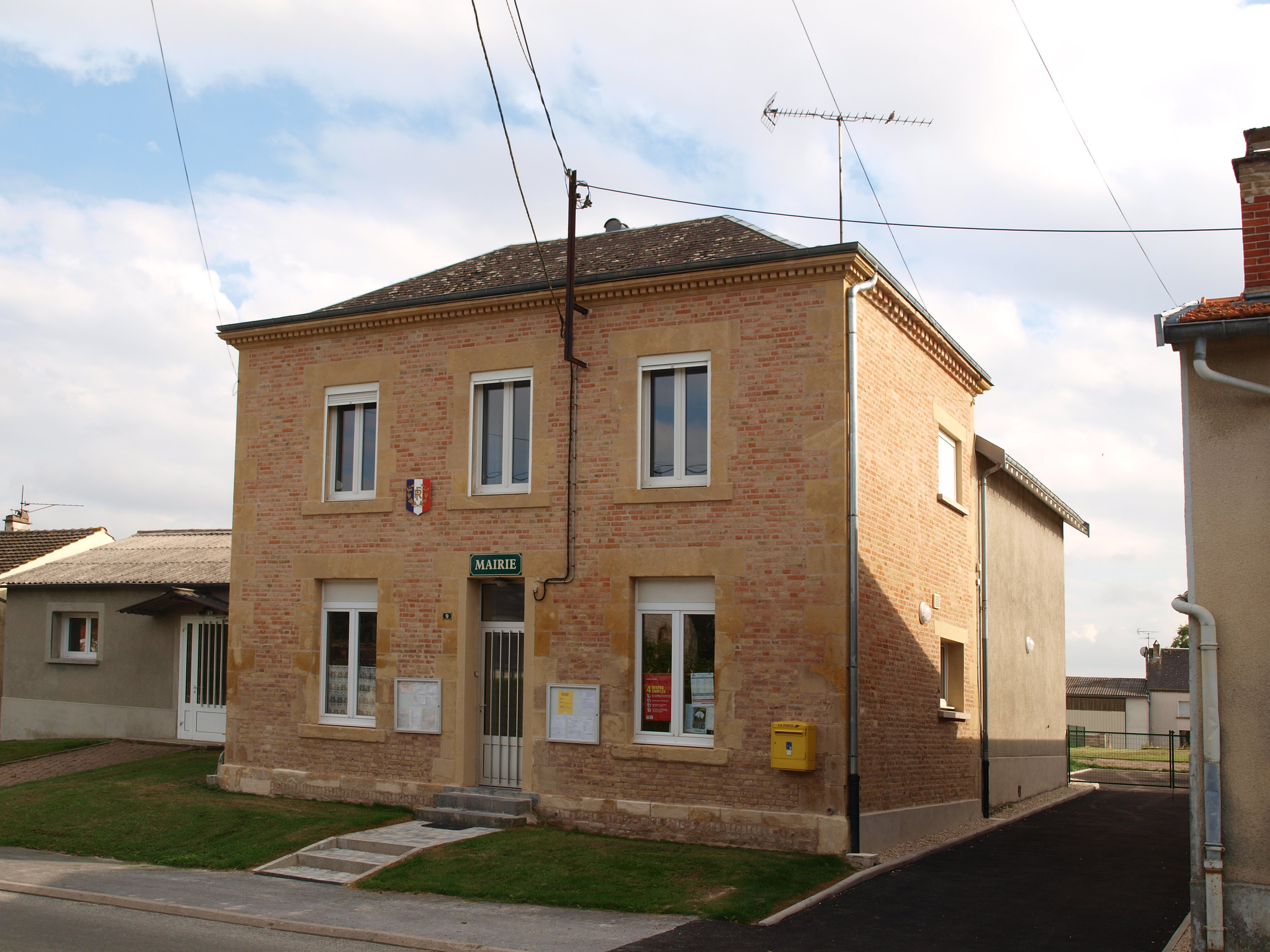
- The town hall in Saint-Pierre-à-Arnes
- Location of Saint-Pierre-à-Arnes
- Location within France Location within Grand Est
- Coordinates: 49°18′01″N 4°27′14″E
- Country: France
- Region: Grand Est
- Department: Ardennes
- Arrondissement: Vouziers
- Canton: Attigny
- Intercommunality: Argonne Ardennaise

Government
  - Mayor (2020–2026): Bertrand Haulin
- Area^{1}: 8.41 km^{2} (3.25 sq mi)
- Elevation: 110 m (360 ft)
- Highest elevation: 420 m (1,380 ft)
- Lowest elevation: 147 m (482 ft)
- Population (2023): 65
  - Density: 7.7/km^{2} (20/sq mi)
- Time zone: UTC+01:00 (CET)
  - Summer (DST): UTC+02:00 (CEST)
- INSEE/Postal code: 08393 /08310
- ^{1} French Land Register data, which excludes lakes, ponds, glaciers > 1 km^{2} (0.386 sq mi or 247 acres) and river estuaries.

Saint-Pierre-à-Arnes is a commune in the Ardennes department in northern France.

== Population ==
Historical population
Year	Pop.	±% p.a.
1968	86	—
1975	77	−1.57%
1982	74	−0.57%
1990	78	+0.66%
1999	69	−1.35%
2007	67	−0.37%
2012	64	−0.91%
2017	67	+0.92%
2023	65	−0.50%
Source: INSEE

== See also ==
- Communes of the Ardennes department
