= Vaux-Champagne =

- Commune
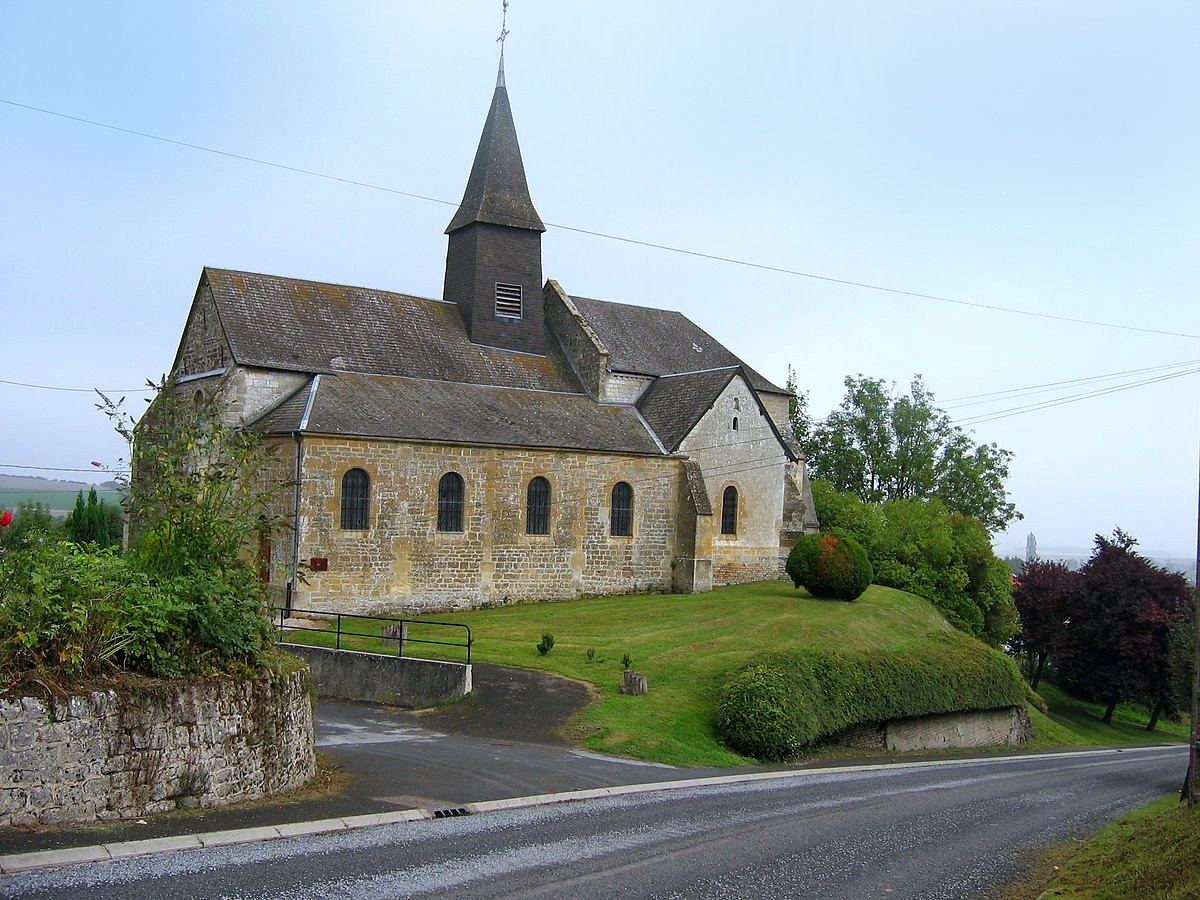
- The church in Vaux-Champagne

- Coat of arms
- Location of Vaux-Champagne
- Location within France Location within Grand Est
- Coordinates: 49°26′37″N 4°33′24″E
- Country: France
- Region: Grand Est
- Department: Ardennes
- Arrondissement: Vouziers
- Canton: Attigny
- Intercommunality: Crêtes Préardennaises

Government
  - Mayor (2020–2026): Pascal Detrez
- Area^{1}: 10.78 km^{2} (4.16 sq mi)
- Elevation: 110 m (360 ft)
- Highest elevation: 172 m (564 ft)
- Lowest elevation: 87 m (285 ft)
- Population (2023): 148
  - Density: 13.7/km^{2} (35.6/sq mi)
- Time zone: UTC+01:00 (CET)
  - Summer (DST): UTC+02:00 (CEST)
- INSEE/Postal code: 08462 /08130
- ^{1} French Land Register data, which excludes lakes, ponds, glaciers > 1 km^{2} (0.386 sq mi or 247 acres) and river estuaries.

Vaux-Champagne (French pronunciation: [vo ʃɑ̃paɲ]) is a commune in the Ardennes department in northern France.

== Population ==
Historical population
Year	Pop.	±% p.a.
1968	151	—
1975	132	−1.90%
1982	107	−2.96%
1990	102	−0.60%
1999	90	−1.38%
2007	116	+3.22%
2012	131	+2.46%
2017	129	−0.31%
2023	148	+2.32%
Source: INSEE

== See also ==
- Communes of the Ardennes department
