= Chevières =

- Commune
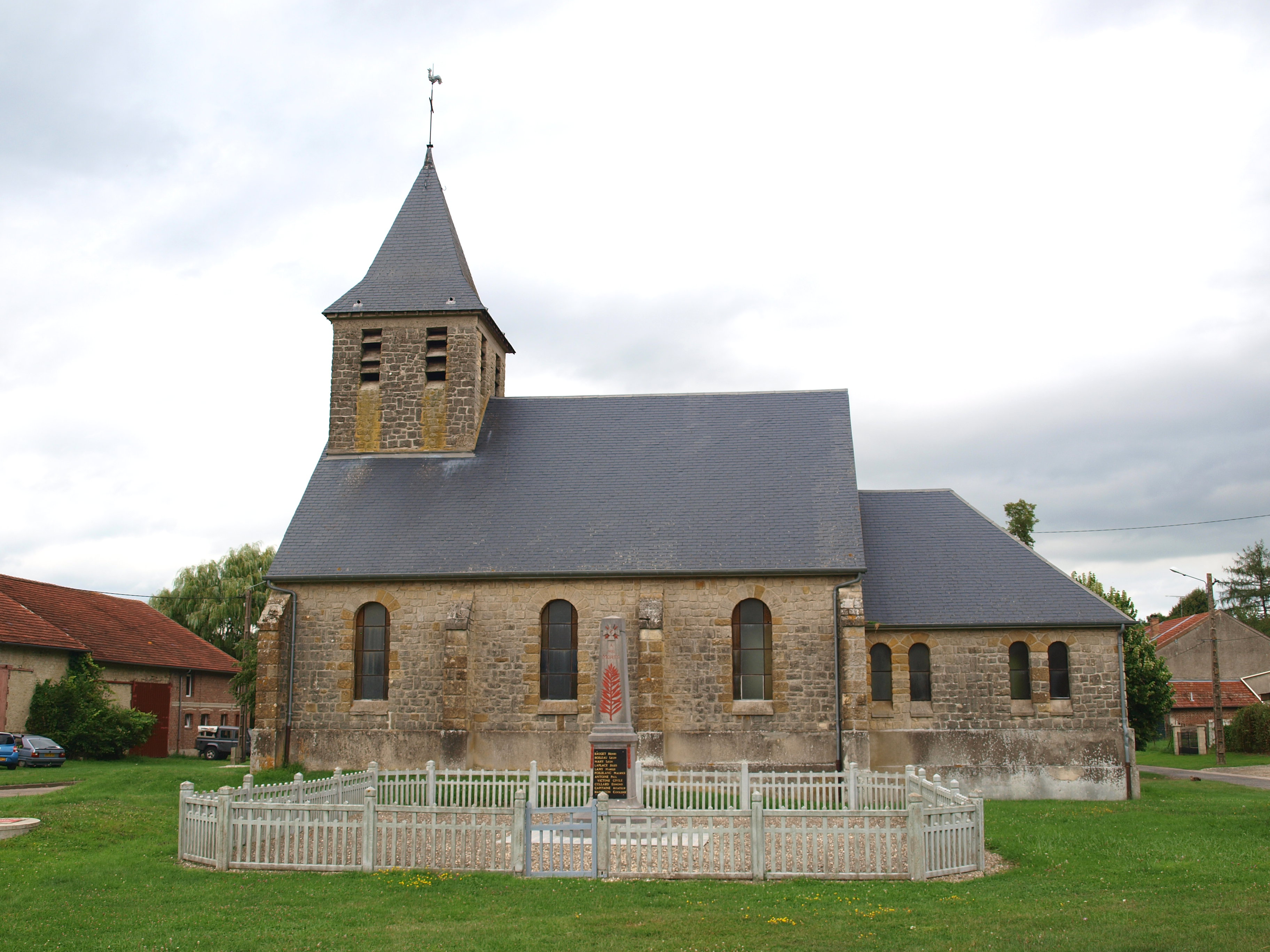
- The church in Chevières
- Location of Chevières
- Location within France Location within Grand Est
- Coordinates: 49°20′01″N 4°54′00″E
- Country: France
- Region: Grand Est
- Department: Ardennes
- Arrondissement: Vouziers
- Canton: Attigny
- Intercommunality: Argonne Ardennaise

Government
  - Mayor (2020–2026): Jean-Charles Genty
- Area^{1}: 6.17 km^{2} (2.38 sq mi)
- Elevation: 130 m (430 ft)
- Highest elevation: 213 m (699 ft)
- Lowest elevation: 117 m (384 ft)
- Population (2023): 46
  - Density: 7.5/km^{2} (19/sq mi)
- Time zone: UTC+01:00 (CET)
  - Summer (DST): UTC+02:00 (CEST)
- INSEE/Postal code: 08120 /08250
- ^{1} French Land Register data, which excludes lakes, ponds, glaciers > 1 km^{2} (0.386 sq mi or 247 acres) and river estuaries.

Chevières (French pronunciation: [ʃəvjɛʁ]) is a commune in the Ardennes department in northern France.

== Population ==
Historical population
| Year | Pop. | ±% p.a. |
|---|---|---|
| 1968 | 62 | — |
| 1975 | 60 | −0.47% |
| 1982 | 58 | −0.48% |
| 1990 | 51 | −1.59% |
| 1999 | 44 | −1.63% |
| 2007 | 51 | +1.86% |
| 2012 | 49 | −0.80% |
| 2017 | 45 | −1.69% |
| 2023 | 46 | +0.37% |
Source: INSEE

== See also ==
- Communes of the Ardennes department
