= Longwé =

- Commune
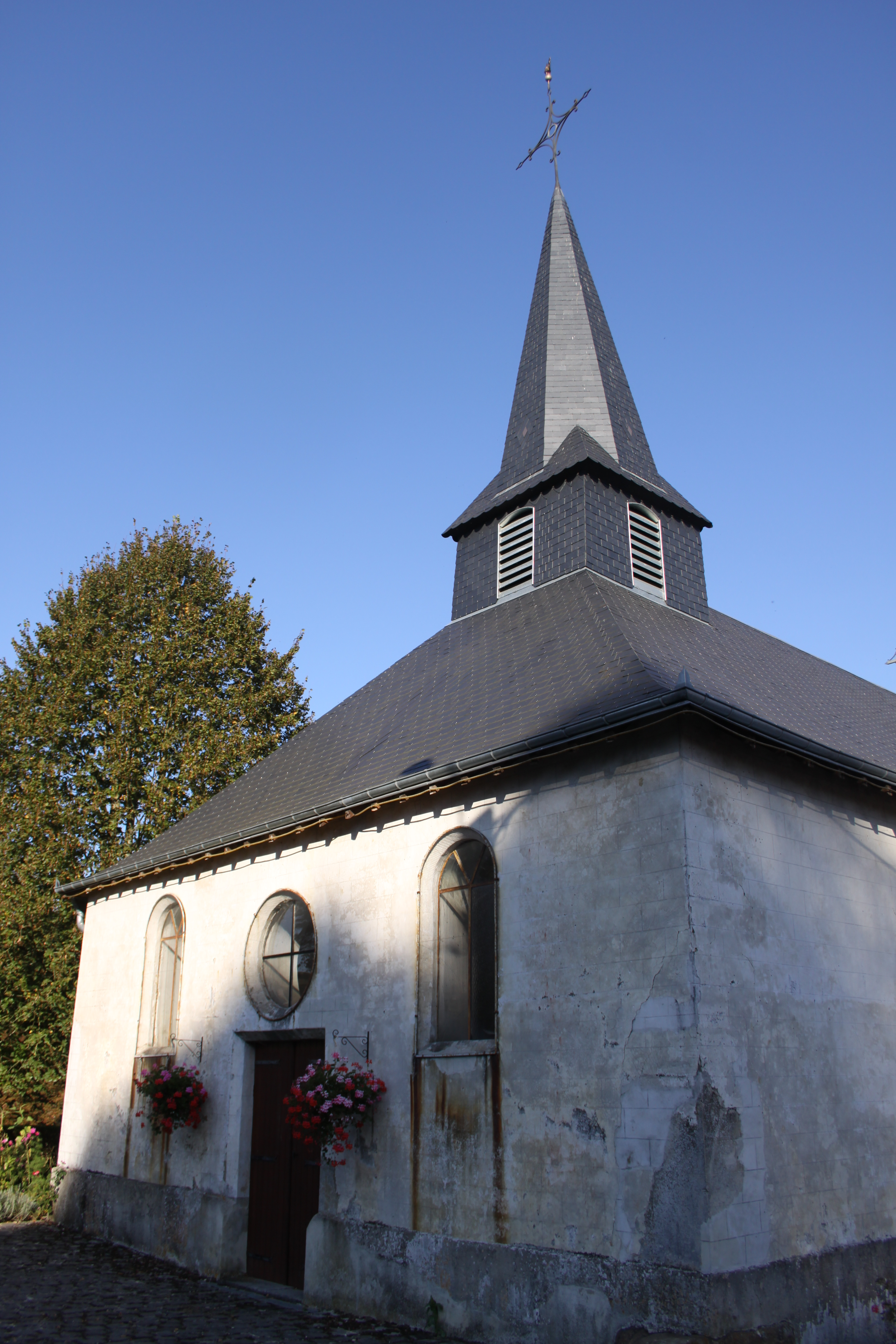
- The church in Longwé
- Location of Longwé
- Location within France Location within Grand Est
- Coordinates: 49°23′25″N 4°47′16″E
- Country: France
- Region: Grand Est
- Department: Ardennes
- Arrondissement: Vouziers
- Canton: Attigny
- Intercommunality: Argonne Ardennaise

Government
  - Mayor (2020–2026): Patrick Lesoille
- Area^{1}: 10.78 km^{2} (4.16 sq mi)
- Elevation: 174 m (571 ft)
- Population (2023): 64
  - Density: 5.9/km^{2} (15/sq mi)
- Time zone: UTC+01:00 (CET)
  - Summer (DST): UTC+02:00 (CEST)
- INSEE/Postal code: 08259 /08400
- ^{1} French Land Register data, which excludes lakes, ponds, glaciers > 1 km^{2} (0.386 sq mi or 247 acres) and river estuaries.

Longwé (French pronunciation: [lɔ̃ve]) is a commune in the Ardennes department and Grand Est region of north-eastern France.

== Population ==
Historical population
Year	Pop.	±% p.a.
1968	153	—
1975	129	−2.41%
1982	101	−3.44%
1990	97	−0.50%
1999	82	−1.85%
2007	89	+1.03%
2012	89	+0.00%
2017	73	−3.89%
2023	64	−2.17%
Source: INSEE

== See also ==
- Communes of the Ardennes department
