= Saint-Morel =

- Commune
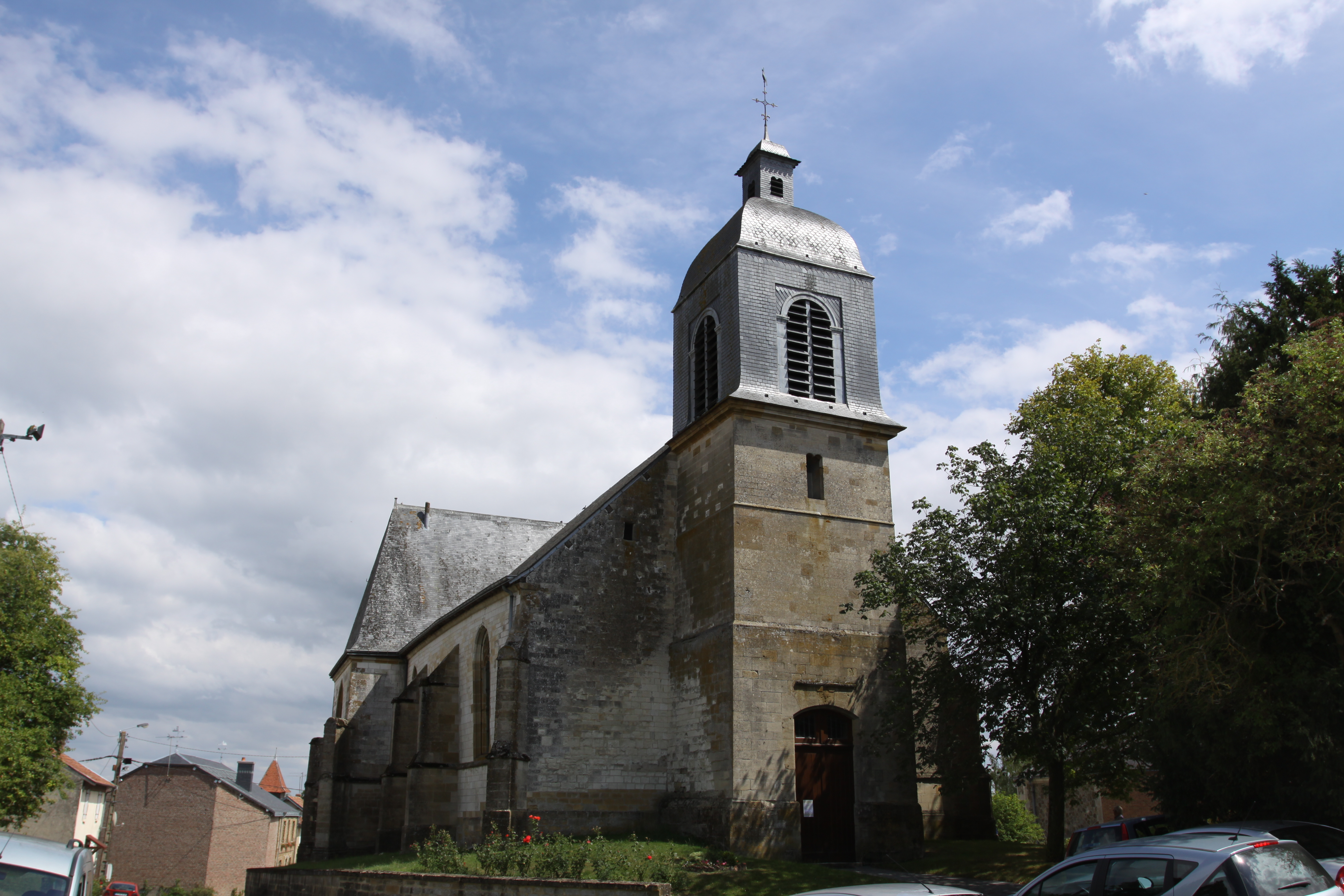
- The church in Saint-Morel

- Coat of arms
- Location of Saint-Morel
- Location within France Location within Grand Est
- Coordinates: 49°20′18″N 4°41′42″E
- Country: France
- Region: Grand Est
- Department: Ardennes
- Arrondissement: Vouziers
- Canton: Attigny
- Intercommunality: Argonne Ardennaise

Government
  - Mayor (2020–2026): Thierry Deglaire
- Area^{1}: 12.04 km^{2} (4.65 sq mi)
- Elevation: 122 m (400 ft)
- Population (2023): 176
  - Density: 14.6/km^{2} (37.9/sq mi)
- Time zone: UTC+01:00 (CET)
  - Summer (DST): UTC+02:00 (CEST)
- INSEE/Postal code: 08392 /08400
- ^{1} French Land Register data, which excludes lakes, ponds, glaciers > 1 km^{2} (0.386 sq mi or 247 acres) and river estuaries.

Saint-Morel (French pronunciation: [sɛ̃ mɔʁɛl]) is a commune in the Ardennes department, region of Grand Est (formerly Champagne-Ardenne), northern France.

== Population ==
Historical population
Year	Pop.	±% p.a.
1968	259	—
1975	198	−3.76%
1982	212	+0.98%
1990	235	+1.30%
1999	227	−0.38%
2007	239	+0.65%
2012	237	−0.17%
2017	210	−2.39%
2023	176	−2.90%
Source: INSEE

== See also ==
- Communes of the Ardennes department
