= Saint-Lambert-et-Mont-de-Jeux =

- Commune
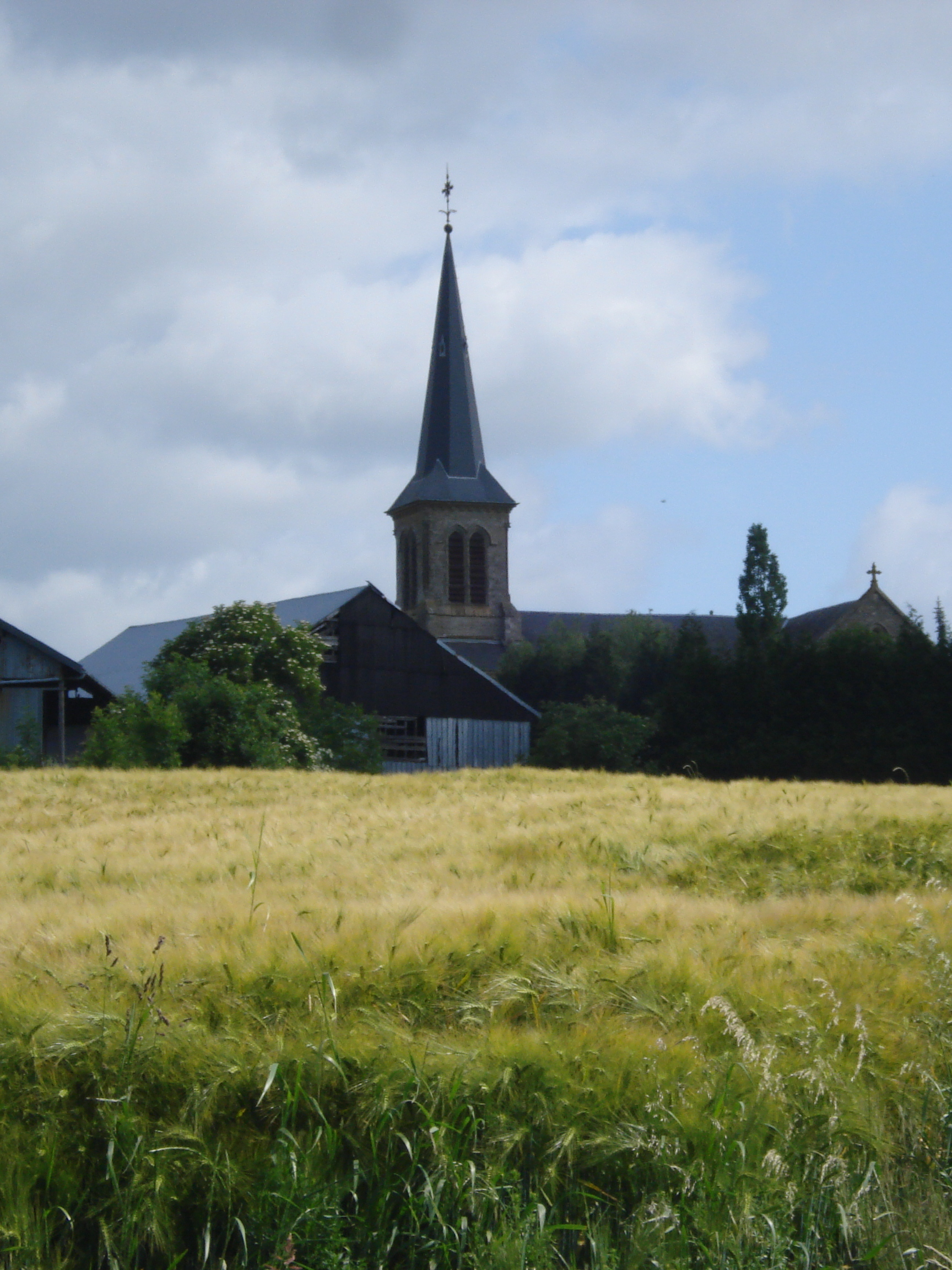
- A general view of Saint-Lambert

- Coat of arms
- Location of Saint-Lambert-et-Mont-de-Jeux
- Location within France Location within Grand Est
- Coordinates: 49°29′56″N 4°36′43″E
- Country: France
- Region: Grand Est
- Department: Ardennes
- Arrondissement: Vouziers
- Canton: Attigny
- Intercommunality: Crêtes Préardennaises

Government
  - Mayor (2020–2026): Philippe Liegeart
- Area^{1}: 10.74 km^{2} (4.15 sq mi)
- Elevation: 109 m (358 ft)
- Highest elevation: 175 m (574 ft)
- Lowest elevation: 82 m (269 ft)
- Population (2023): 123
  - Density: 11.5/km^{2} (29.7/sq mi)
- Time zone: UTC+01:00 (CET)
  - Summer (DST): UTC+02:00 (CEST)
- INSEE/Postal code: 08384 /08130
- ^{1} French Land Register data, which excludes lakes, ponds, glaciers > 1 km^{2} (0.386 sq mi or 247 acres) and river estuaries.

Saint-Lambert-et-Mont-de-Jeux (French pronunciation: [sɛ̃ lɑ̃bɛʁ e mɔ̃ də ʒø]) is a commune in the Ardennes department in northern France.

== Population ==
Historical population
Year	Pop.	±% p.a.
1968	230	—
1975	210	−1.29%
1982	192	−1.27%
1990	180	−0.80%
1999	185	+0.30%
2007	187	+0.13%
2012	152	−4.06%
2017	145	−0.94%
2023	123	−2.71%
Source: INSEE

== See also ==
- Communes of the Ardennes department
