= Charbogne =

- Commune
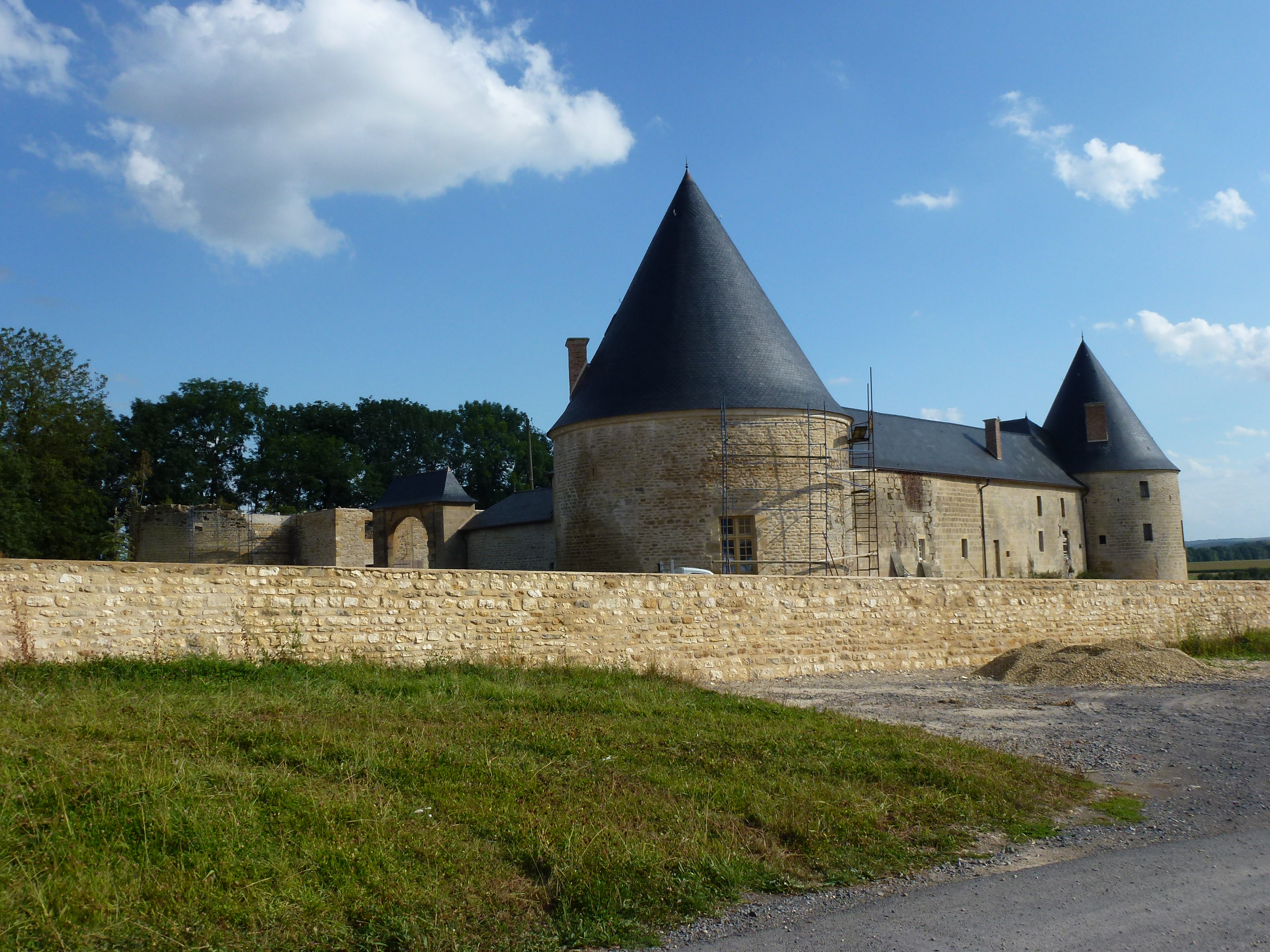
- Fortified farm

- Coat of arms
- Location of Charbogne
- Location within France Location within Grand Est
- Coordinates: 49°30′12″N 4°35′20″E
- Country: France
- Region: Grand Est
- Department: Ardennes
- Arrondissement: Vouziers
- Canton: Attigny
- Intercommunality: Crêtes Préardennaises

Government
  - Mayor (2020–2026): Hugues Habert
- Area^{1}: 9.06 km^{2} (3.50 sq mi)
- Elevation: 85 m (279 ft)
- Highest elevation: 147 m (482 ft)
- Lowest elevation: 79 m (259 ft)
- Population (2023): 218
  - Density: 24.1/km^{2} (62.3/sq mi)
- Time zone: UTC+01:00 (CET)
  - Summer (DST): UTC+02:00 (CEST)
- INSEE/Postal code: 08103 /08130
- ^{1} French Land Register data, which excludes lakes, ponds, glaciers > 1 km^{2} (0.386 sq mi or 247 acres) and river estuaries.

Charbogne (French pronunciation: [ʃaʁbɔɲ]) is a commune in the Ardennes department in northern France.

== Population ==
Historical population
Year	Pop.	±% p.a.
1968	258	—
1975	246	−0.68%
1982	207	−2.44%
1990	184	−1.46%
1999	206	+1.26%
2007	212	+0.36%
2012	208	−0.38%
2017	225	+1.58%
2023	218	−0.53%
Source: INSEE

== See also ==
- Communes of the Ardennes department
