= Cauroy =

- Commune
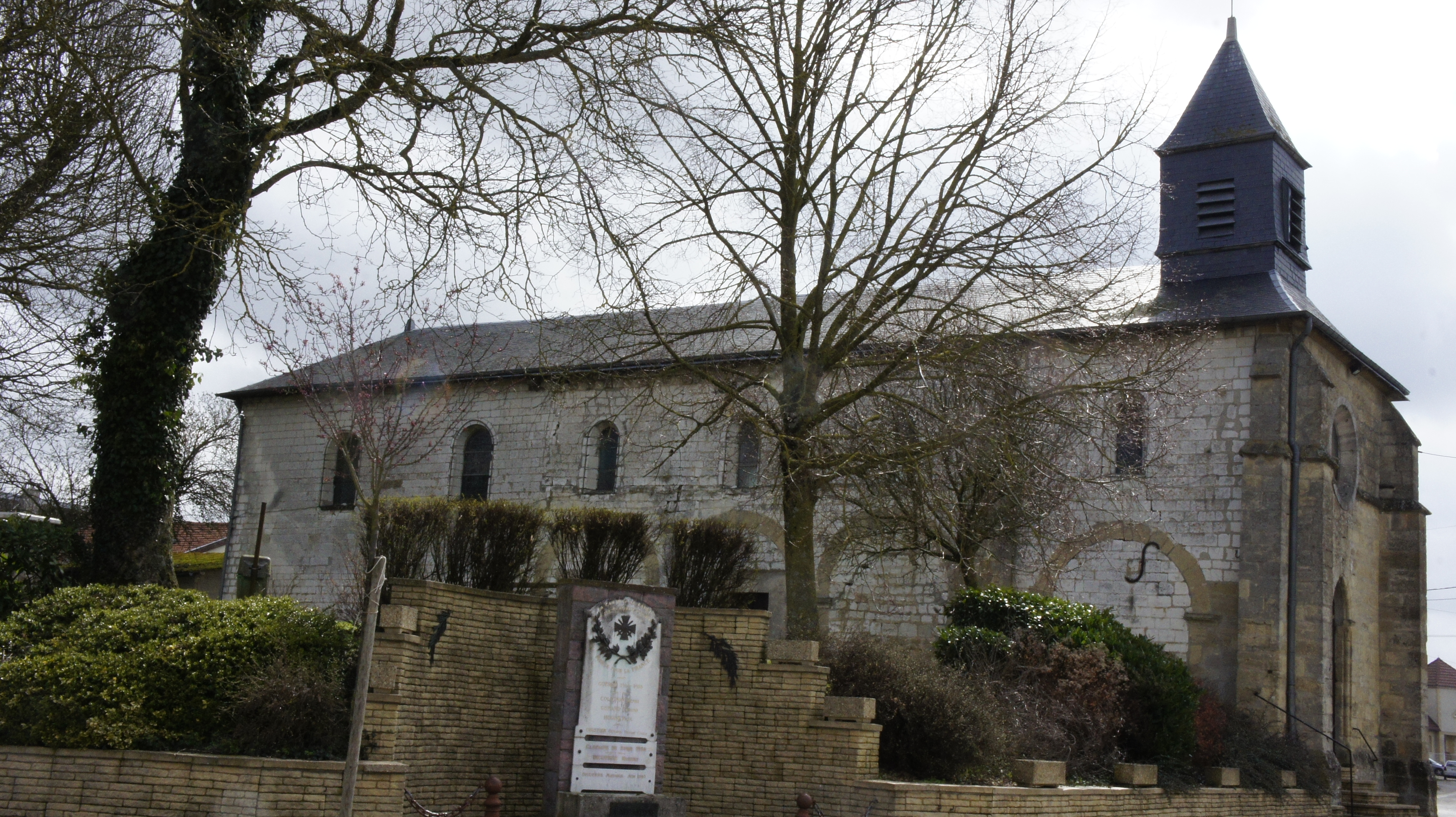
- The church in Cauroy
- Location of Cauroy
- Location within France Location within Grand Est
- Coordinates: 49°20′55″N 4°28′16″E
- Country: France
- Region: Grand Est
- Department: Ardennes
- Arrondissement: Vouziers
- Canton: Attigny
- Intercommunality: Argonne Ardennaise

Government
  - Mayor (2020–2026): Dominique Danneaux
- Area^{1}: 17.46 km^{2} (6.74 sq mi)
- Elevation: 140 m (460 ft)
- Highest elevation: 174 m (571 ft)
- Lowest elevation: 117 m (384 ft)
- Population (2023): 192
  - Density: 11.0/km^{2} (28.5/sq mi)
- Time zone: UTC+01:00 (CET)
  - Summer (DST): UTC+02:00 (CEST)
- INSEE/Postal code: 08092 /08310
- ^{1} French Land Register data, which excludes lakes, ponds, glaciers > 1 km^{2} (0.386 sq mi or 247 acres) and river estuaries.

Cauroy (French pronunciation: [koʁwa]) is a commune in the Ardennes department in northern France.

== Population ==
Historical population
| Year | Pop. | ±% p.a. |
|---|---|---|
| 1968 | 180 | — |
| 1975 | 178 | −0.16% |
| 1982 | 180 | +0.16% |
| 1990 | 244 | +3.88% |
| 1999 | 194 | −2.52% |
| 2007 | 196 | +0.13% |
| 2012 | 186 | −1.04% |
| 2017 | 189 | +0.32% |
| 2023 | 192 | +0.26% |
Source: INSEE

== See also ==
- Communes of the Ardennes department
