= Mont-Saint-Remy =

- Commune
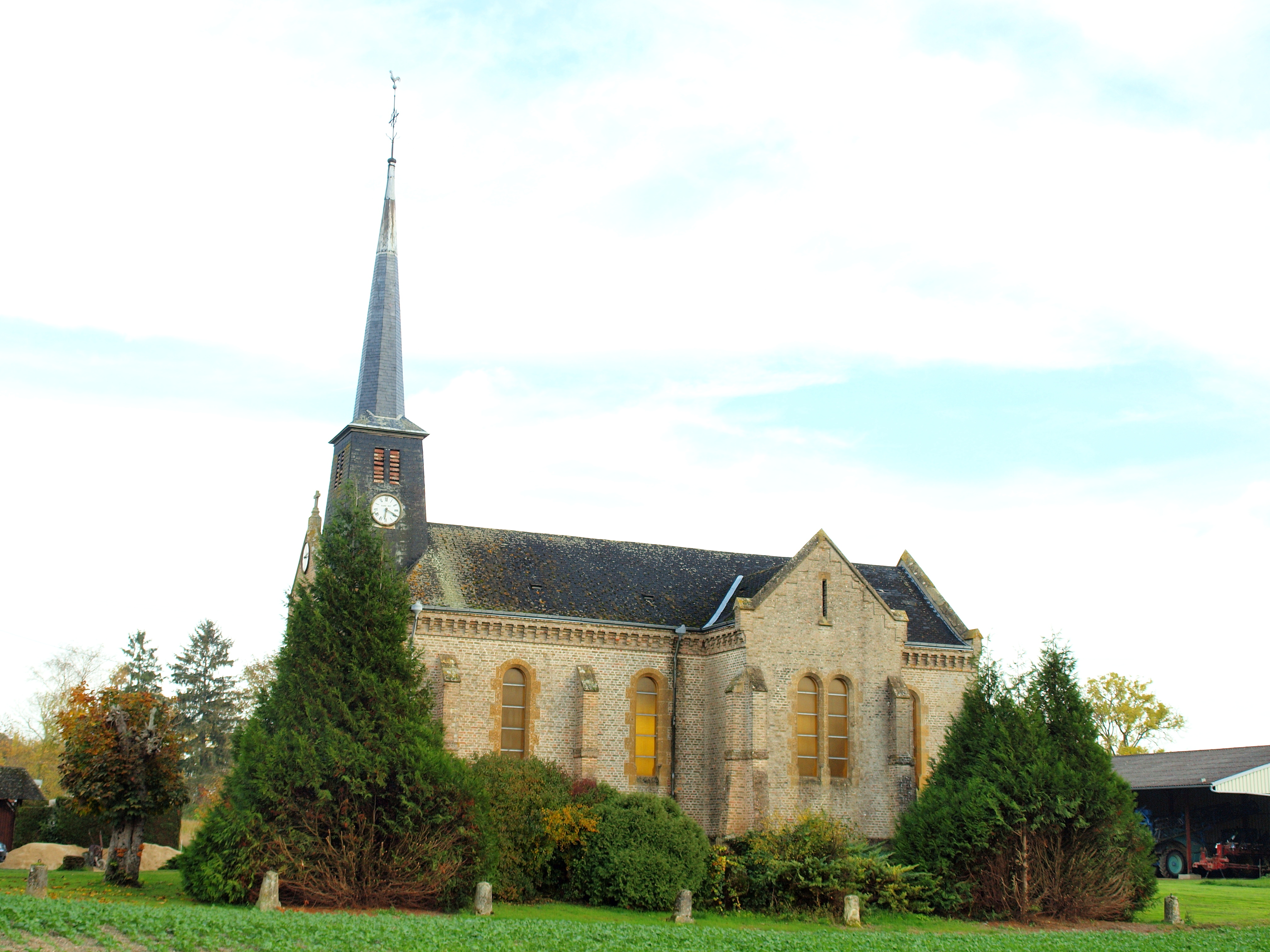
- The church in Mont-Saint-Remy
- Location of Mont-Saint-Remy
- Location within France Location within Grand Est
- Coordinates: 49°23′23″N 4°28′57″E
- Country: France
- Region: Grand Est
- Department: Ardennes
- Arrondissement: Vouziers
- Canton: Attigny
- Intercommunality: Argonne Ardennaise

Government
  - Mayor (2020–2026): Emmanuel Auroux
- Area^{1}: 7.55 km^{2} (2.92 sq mi)
- Elevation: 115 m (377 ft)
- Highest elevation: 135 m (443 ft)
- Lowest elevation: 98 m (322 ft)
- Population (2023): 51
  - Density: 6.8/km^{2} (17/sq mi)
- Time zone: UTC+01:00 (CET)
  - Summer (DST): UTC+02:00 (CEST)
- INSEE/Postal code: 08309 /08310
- ^{1} French Land Register data, which excludes lakes, ponds, glaciers > 1 km^{2} (0.386 sq mi or 247 acres) and river estuaries.

Mont-Saint-Remy (French pronunciation: [mɔ̃ sɛ̃ ʁemi]) is a commune in the Ardennes department and Grand Est region of north-eastern France.

== Population ==
Historical population
Year	Pop.	±% p.a.
1968	62	—
1975	69	+1.54%
1982	62	−1.52%
1990	45	−3.93%
1999	37	−2.15%
2007	52	+4.35%
2012	53	+0.38%
2017	56	+1.11%
2023	51	−1.55%
Source: INSEE

== See also ==
- Communes of the Ardennes department
