= Liry =

- Commune
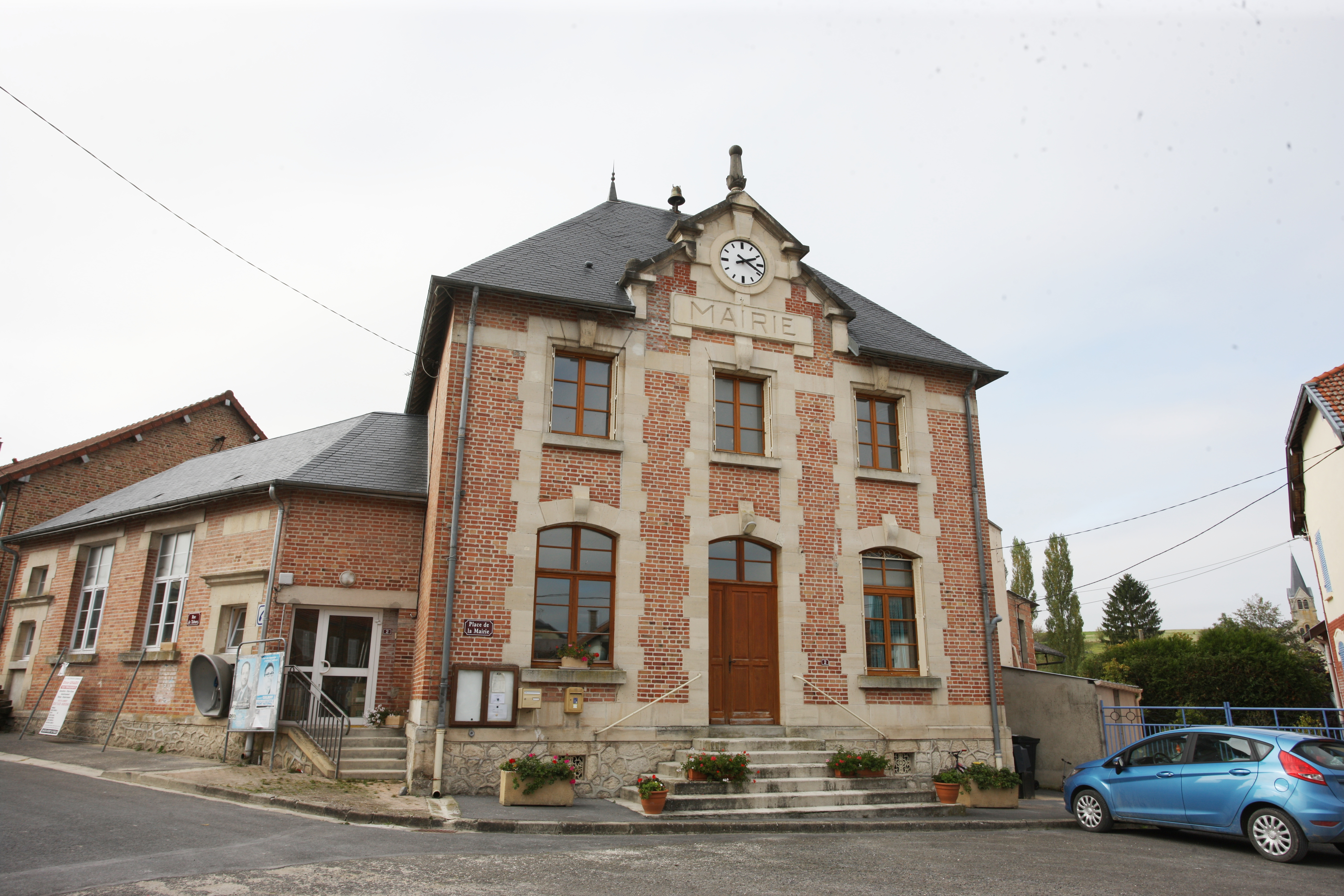
- The town hall in Liry

- Coat of arms
- Location of Liry
- Location within France Location within Grand Est
- Coordinates: 49°18′30″N 4°39′35″E
- Country: France
- Region: Grand Est
- Department: Ardennes
- Arrondissement: Vouziers
- Canton: Attigny
- Intercommunality: Argonne Ardennaise

Government
  - Mayor (2020–2026): Jacques Bouillon
- Area^{1}: 12.69 km^{2} (4.90 sq mi)
- Elevation: 120 m (390 ft)
- Population (2023): 92
  - Density: 7.2/km^{2} (19/sq mi)
- Time zone: UTC+01:00 (CET)
  - Summer (DST): UTC+02:00 (CEST)
- INSEE/Postal code: 08256 /08400
- ^{1} French Land Register data, which excludes lakes, ponds, glaciers > 1 km^{2} (0.386 sq mi or 247 acres) and river estuaries.

Liry (French pronunciation: [liʁi]) is a commune in the Ardennes department in northern France.

== Population ==
Historical population
Year	Pop.	±% p.a.
1968	145	—
1975	119	−2.78%
1982	119	+0.00%
1990	106	−1.44%
1999	96	−1.09%
2007	106	+1.25%
2012	103	−0.57%
2017	88	−3.10%
2023	92	+0.74%
Source: INSEE

== See also ==
- Communes of the Ardennes department
