= Lametz =

- Commune
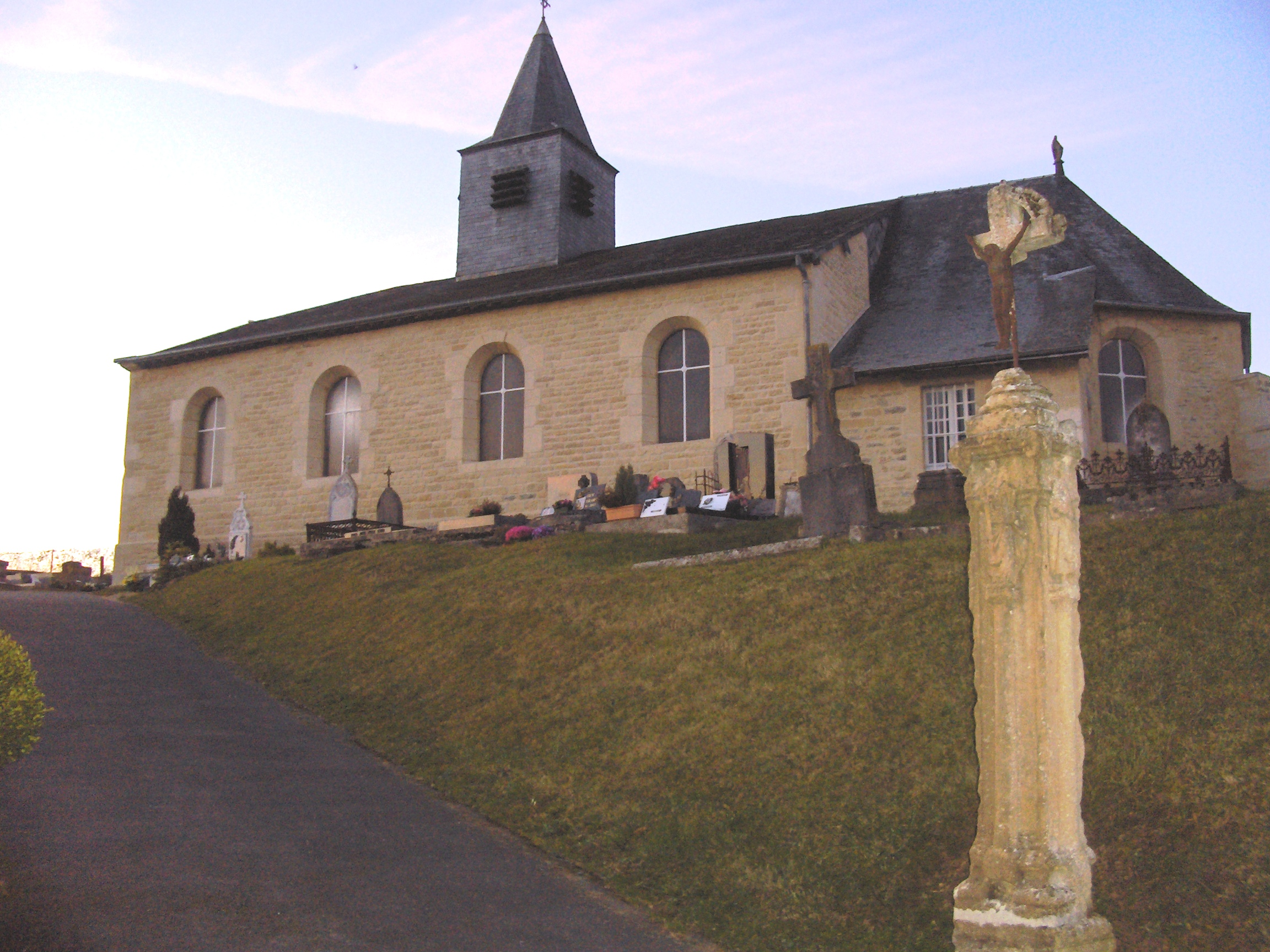
- The church in Lametz

- Coat of arms
- Location of Lametz
- Location within France Location within Grand Est
- Coordinates: 49°31′53″N 4°41′27″E
- Country: France
- Region: Grand Est
- Department: Ardennes
- Arrondissement: Vouziers
- Canton: Attigny
- Intercommunality: Crêtes Préardennaises

Government
  - Mayor (2020–2026): Thierry Warzee
- Area^{1}: 9.46 km^{2} (3.65 sq mi)
- Elevation: 170 m (560 ft)
- Highest elevation: 198 m (650 ft)
- Lowest elevation: 157 m (515 ft)
- Population (2023): 76
  - Density: 8.0/km^{2} (21/sq mi)
- Time zone: UTC+01:00 (CET)
  - Summer (DST): UTC+02:00 (CEST)
- INSEE/Postal code: 08244 /08130
- ^{1} French Land Register data, which excludes lakes, ponds, glaciers > 1 km^{2} (0.386 sq mi or 247 acres) and river estuaries.

Lametz (French pronunciation: [lame]) is a commune in the Ardennes department in northern France.

== Population ==
Historical population
Year	Pop.	±% p.a.
1968	100	—
1975	80	−3.14%
1982	75	−0.92%
1990	68	−1.22%
1999	77	+1.39%
2007	79	+0.32%
2012	78	−0.25%
2017	72	−1.59%
2023	76	+0.91%
Source: INSEE

== See also ==
- Communes of the Ardennes department
