= Coulommes-et-Marqueny =

- Commune
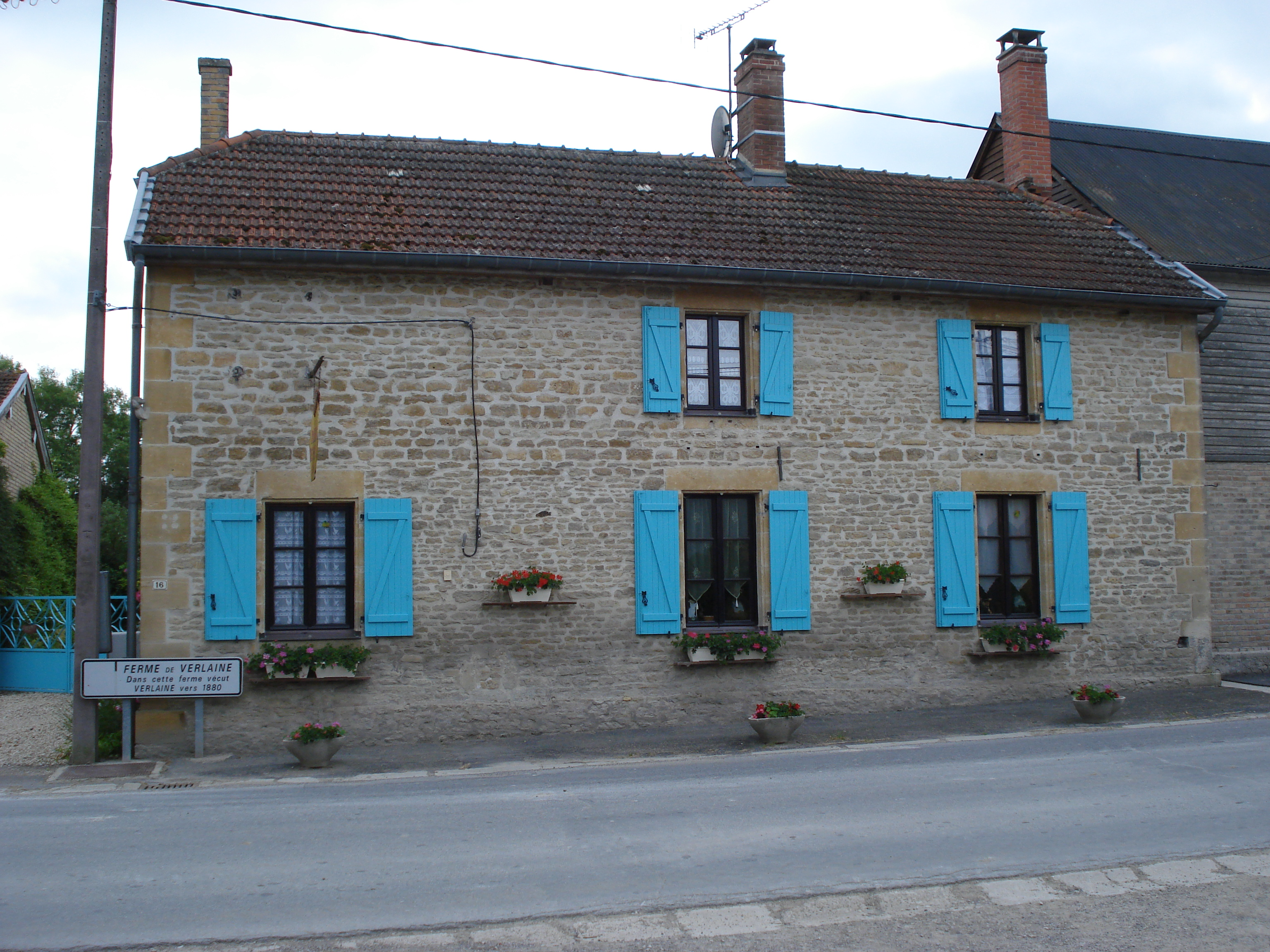
- The Verlaine farm in Coulommes
- Location of Coulommes-et-Marqueny
- Location within France Location within Grand Est
- Coordinates: 49°26′09″N 4°34′49″E
- Country: France
- Region: Grand Est
- Department: Ardennes
- Arrondissement: Vouziers
- Canton: Attigny
- Intercommunality: Crêtes Préardennaises

Government
  - Mayor (2020–2026): Guy Decloux
- Area^{1}: 11.99 km^{2} (4.63 sq mi)
- Elevation: 108 m (354 ft)
- Highest elevation: 177 m (581 ft)
- Lowest elevation: 95 m (312 ft)
- Population (2023): 75
  - Density: 6.3/km^{2} (16/sq mi)
- Time zone: UTC+01:00 (CET)
  - Summer (DST): UTC+02:00 (CEST)
- INSEE/Postal code: 08134 /08130
- ^{1} French Land Register data, which excludes lakes, ponds, glaciers > 1 km^{2} (0.386 sq mi or 247 acres) and river estuaries.

Coulommes-et-Marqueny (French pronunciation: [kulɔm e maʁkəni]) is a commune in the Ardennes department in northern France.

== Population ==
Historical population
Year	Pop.	±% p.a.
1968	113	—
1975	92	−2.89%
1982	84	−1.29%
1990	107	+3.07%
1999	87	−2.27%
2007	93	+0.84%
2012	92	−0.22%
2017	83	−2.04%
2023	75	−1.68%
Source: INSEE

== See also ==
- Communes of the Ardennes department
