= Tourteron =

- Commune
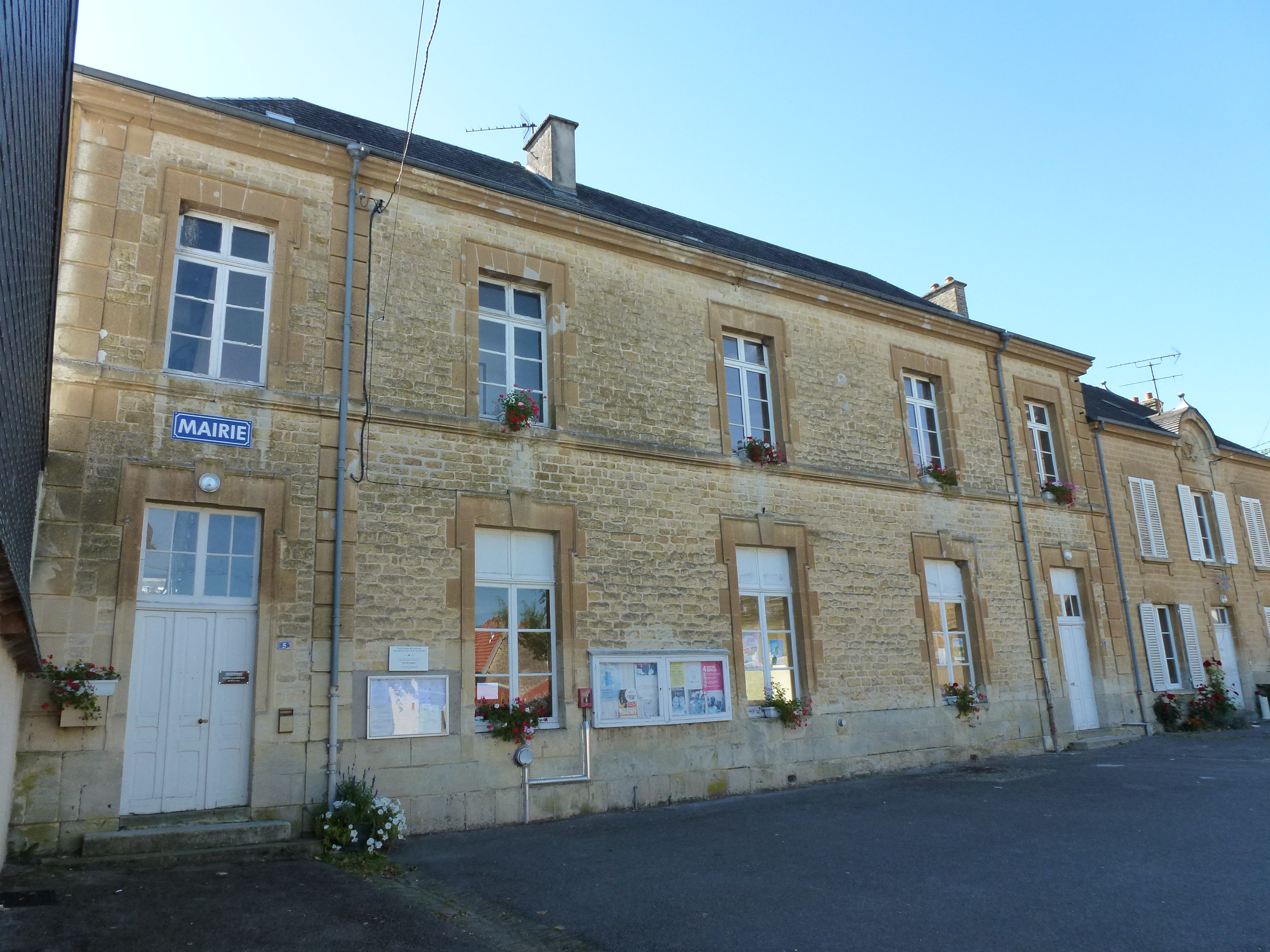
- The town hall in Tourteron

- Coat of arms
- Location of Tourteron
- Location within France Location within Grand Est
- Coordinates: 49°32′24″N 4°38′18″E
- Country: France
- Region: Grand Est
- Department: Ardennes
- Arrondissement: Vouziers
- Canton: Attigny
- Intercommunality: Crêtes Préardennaises

Government
  - Mayor (2020–2026): Michel Claude
- Area^{1}: 8.83 km^{2} (3.41 sq mi)
- Elevation: 150 m (490 ft)
- Population (2023): 177
  - Density: 20.0/km^{2} (51.9/sq mi)
- Time zone: UTC+01:00 (CET)
  - Summer (DST): UTC+02:00 (CEST)
- INSEE/Postal code: 08458 /08130
- ^{1} French Land Register data, which excludes lakes, ponds, glaciers > 1 km^{2} (0.386 sq mi or 247 acres) and river estuaries.

Tourteron (French pronunciation: [tuʁtəʁɔ̃]) is a commune in the Ardennes department in northern France.

== Population ==
Historical population
Year	Pop.	±% p.a.
1968	245	—
1975	207	−2.38%
1982	189	−1.29%
1990	187	−0.13%
1999	186	−0.06%
2007	173	−0.90%
2012	180	+0.80%
2017	179	−0.11%
2023	177	−0.19%
Source: INSEE

== See also ==
- Communes of the Ardennes department
