= Hauviné =

- Commune
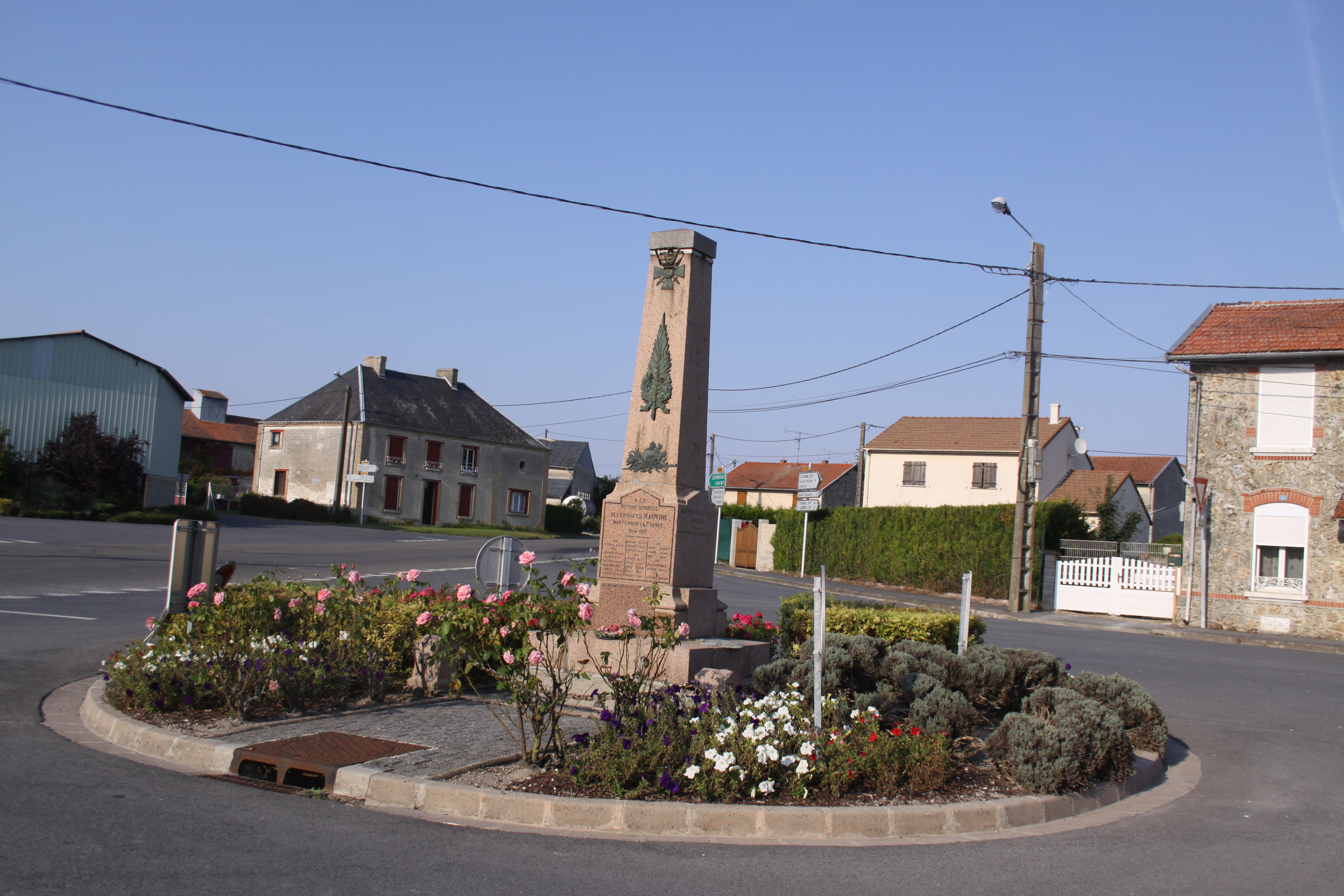
- War memorial
- Location of Hauviné
- Location within France Location within Grand Est
- Coordinates: 49°18′13″N 4°24′04″E
- Country: France
- Region: Grand Est
- Department: Ardennes
- Arrondissement: Vouziers
- Canton: Attigny
- Intercommunality: Argonne Ardennaise

Government
  - Mayor (2020–2026): Guy Leclercq
- Area^{1}: 14.55 km^{2} (5.62 sq mi)
- Elevation: 115 m (377 ft)
- Highest elevation: 159 m (522 ft)
- Lowest elevation: 103 m (338 ft)
- Population (2023): 311
  - Density: 21.4/km^{2} (55.4/sq mi)
- Time zone: UTC+01:00 (CET)
  - Summer (DST): UTC+02:00 (CEST)
- INSEE/Postal code: 08220 /08310
- ^{1} French Land Register data, which excludes lakes, ponds, glaciers > 1 km^{2} (0.386 sq mi or 247 acres) and river estuaries.

Hauviné (French pronunciation: [ovine]) is a commune in the Ardennes department and Grand Est region of north-eastern France.

== Population ==
Historical population
Year	Pop.	±% p.a.
1968	297	—
1975	258	−1.99%
1982	229	−1.69%
1990	221	−0.44%
1999	232	+0.54%
2007	271	+1.96%
2012	310	+2.73%
2017	327	+1.07%
2023	311	−0.83%
Source: INSEE

== See also ==
- Communes of the Ardennes department
