= Saint-Clément-à-Arnes =

- Commune
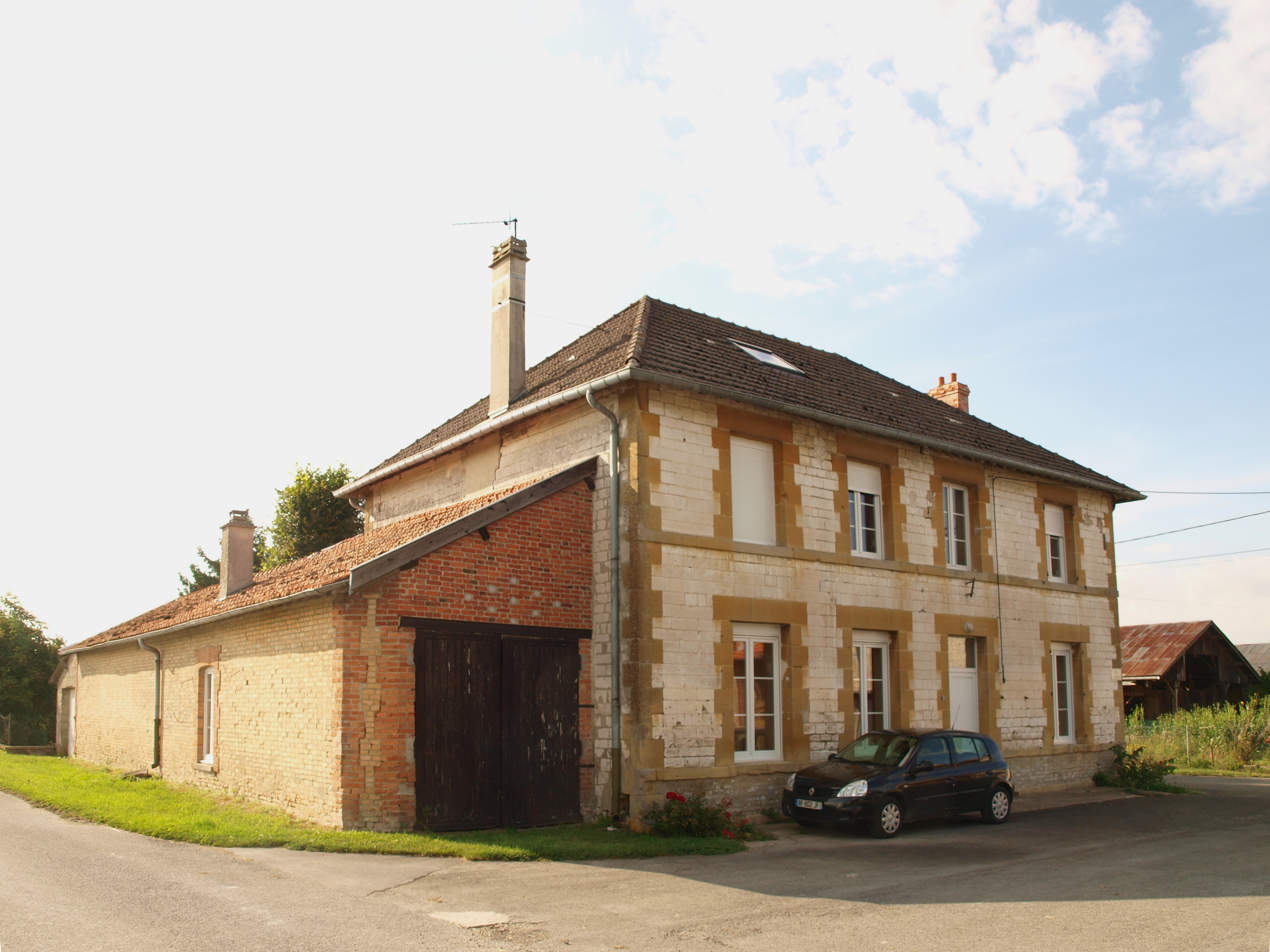
- The town hall in Saint-Clément-à-Arnes

- Coat of arms
- Location of Saint-Clément-à-Arnes
- Location within France Location within Grand Est
- Coordinates: 49°18′05″N 4°25′46″E
- Country: France
- Region: Grand Est
- Department: Ardennes
- Arrondissement: Vouziers
- Canton: Attigny
- Intercommunality: Argonne Ardennaise

Government
  - Mayor (2020–2026): Denis Oudin
- Area^{1}: 10.13 km^{2} (3.91 sq mi)
- Elevation: 111 m (364 ft)
- Highest elevation: 167 m (548 ft)
- Lowest elevation: 104 m (341 ft)
- Population (2023): 112
  - Density: 11.1/km^{2} (28.6/sq mi)
- Time zone: UTC+01:00 (CET)
  - Summer (DST): UTC+02:00 (CEST)
- INSEE/Postal code: 08378 /08310
- ^{1} French Land Register data, which excludes lakes, ponds, glaciers > 1 km^{2} (0.386 sq mi or 247 acres) and river estuaries.

Saint-Clément-à-Arnes is a commune in the Ardennes department in northern France.

== Population ==
Historical population
Year	Pop.	±% p.a.
1968	145	—
1975	156	+1.05%
1982	109	−4.99%
1990	115	+0.67%
1999	115	+0.00%
2007	106	−1.01%
2012	106	+0.00%
2017	107	+0.19%
2023	112	+0.76%
Source: INSEE

== See also ==
- Communes of the Ardennes department
