= Rilly-sur-Aisne =

- Commune
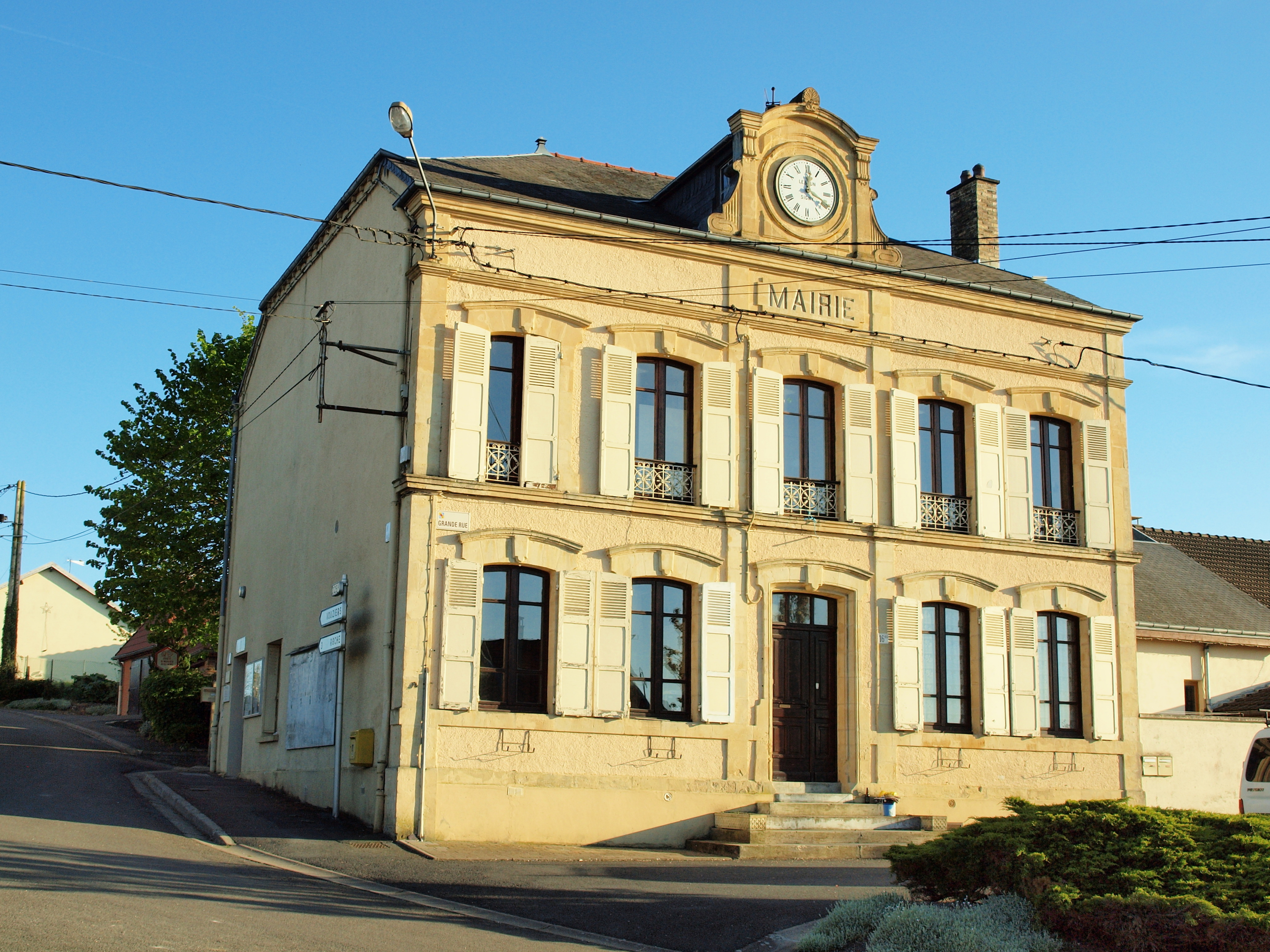
- The town hall in Rilly-sur-Aisne

- Coat of arms
- Location of Rilly-sur-Aisne
- Location within France Location within Grand Est
- Coordinates: 49°29′18″N 4°38′07″E
- Country: France
- Region: Grand Est
- Department: Ardennes
- Arrondissement: Vouziers
- Canton: Attigny
- Intercommunality: Crêtes Préardennaises

Government
  - Mayor (2021–2026): Jean-Marc Roger
- Area^{1}: 3.44 km^{2} (1.33 sq mi)
- Elevation: 88 m (289 ft)
- Highest elevation: 117 m (384 ft)
- Lowest elevation: 82 m (269 ft)
- Population (2023): 121
  - Density: 35.2/km^{2} (91.1/sq mi)
- Time zone: UTC+01:00 (CET)
  - Summer (DST): UTC+02:00 (CEST)
- INSEE/Postal code: 08364 /08130
- ^{1} French Land Register data, which excludes lakes, ponds, glaciers > 1 km^{2} (0.386 sq mi or 247 acres) and river estuaries.

Rilly-sur-Aisne is a commune in the Ardennes department in northern France.

== Population ==
Historical population
Year	Pop.	±% p.a.
1968	121	—
1975	102	−2.41%
1982	111	+1.22%
1990	111	+0.00%
1999	105	−0.62%
2007	108	+0.35%
2012	108	+0.00%
2017	141	+5.48%
2023	121	−2.52%
Source: INSEE

== See also ==
- Communes of the Ardennes department
