= Canton of Attigny =

Coordinates: 49.48°N 4.58°E

- Canton
- Situation of the canton of Attigny in the department of Ardennes
- Country: France
- Region: Grand Est
- Department: Ardennes
- No. of communes: {{{nbcomm}}}
- Population (2023): 11,691
- INSEE code: 0801

The canton of Attigny is an administrative division of the Ardennes department, northern France. Its borders were modified at the French canton reorganisation which came into effect in March 2015. Its seat is in Attigny.

It consists of the following communes:

1. Alland'Huy-et-Sausseuil
2. Apremont
3. Ardeuil-et-Montfauxelles
4. Attigny
5. Aure
6. Autry
7. Beffu-et-le-Morthomme
8. Bouconville
9. Bourcq
10. Brécy-Brières
11. Cauroy
12. Challerange
13. Champigneulle
14. Charbogne
15. Chardeny
16. Chatel-Chéhéry
17. Chevières
18. Chuffilly-Roche
19. Condé-lès-Autry
20. Contreuve
21. Cornay
22. Coulommes-et-Marqueny
23. Dricourt
24. Écordal
25. Exermont
26. Falaise
27. Fléville
28. Givry
29. Grandham
30. Grandpré
31. Grivy-Loisy
32. Guincourt
33. Hauviné
34. Jonval
35. Lametz
36. Lançon
37. Leffincourt
38. Liry
39. Longwé
40. Machault
41. Manre
42. Marcq
43. Marquigny
44. Mars-sous-Bourcq
45. Marvaux-Vieux
46. Montcheutin
47. Monthois
48. Mont-Saint-Martin
49. Mont-Saint-Remy
50. Mouron
51. Neuville-Day
52. Olizy-Primat
53. Pauvres
54. Quilly
55. Rilly-sur-Aisne
56. La Sabotterie
57. Saint-Clément-à-Arnes
58. Sainte-Marie
59. Saint-Étienne-à-Arnes
60. Sainte-Vaubourg
61. Saint-Juvin
62. Saint-Lambert-et-Mont-de-Jeux
63. Saint-Loup-Terrier
64. Saint-Morel
65. Saint-Pierre-à-Arnes
66. Saulces-Champenoises
67. Savigny-sur-Aisne
68. Séchault
69. Semide
70. Semuy
71. Senuc
72. Sommerance
73. Sugny
74. Suzanne
75. Tourcelles-Chaumont
76. Tourteron
77. Vaux-Champagne
78. Vaux-lès-Mouron
79. Voncq
