= Grandham =

- Commune
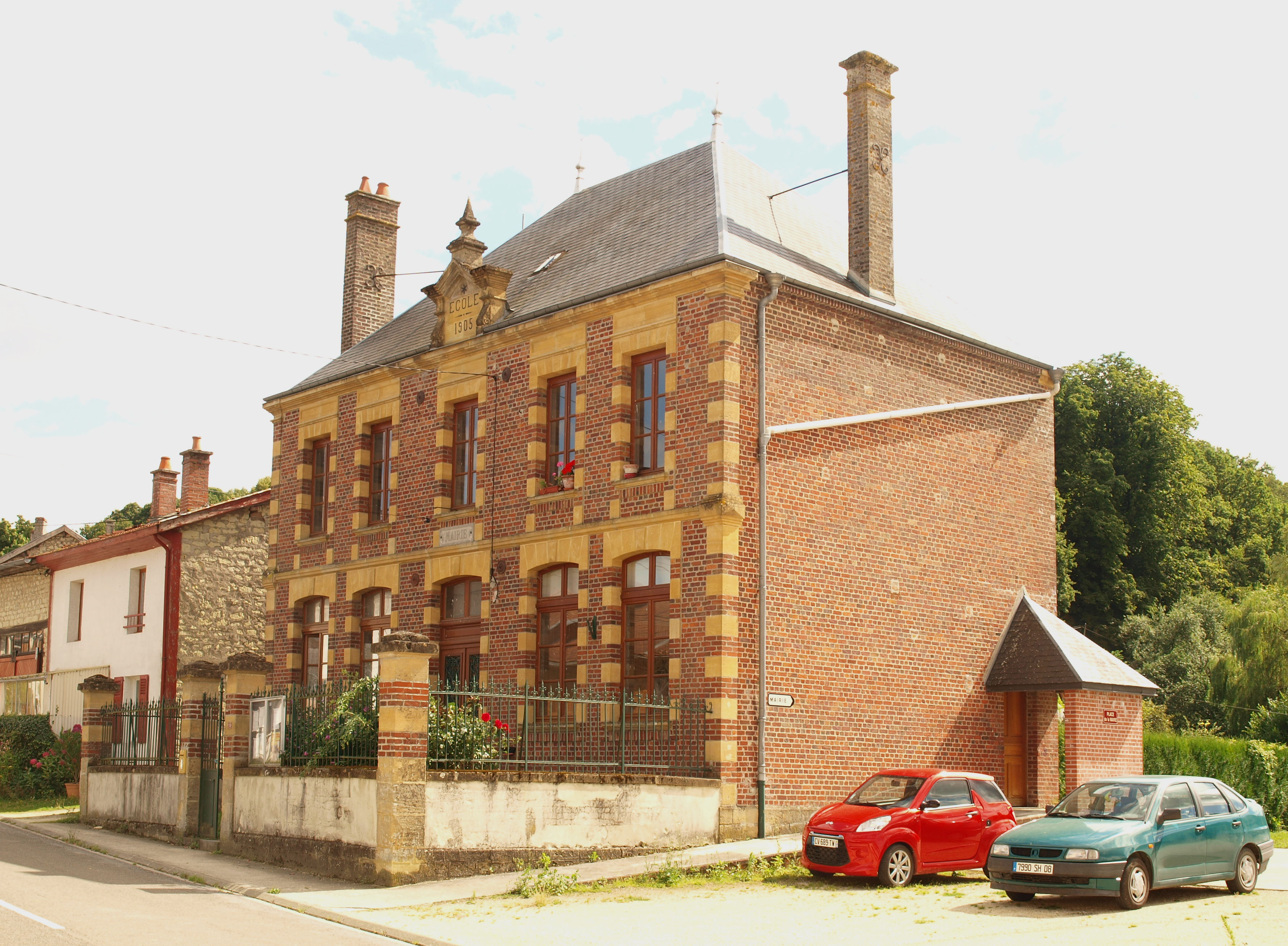
- The town hall in Grandham
- Location of Grandham
- Location within France Location within Grand Est
- Coordinates: 49°18′02″N 4°51′38″E
- Country: France
- Region: Grand Est
- Department: Ardennes
- Arrondissement: Vouziers
- Canton: Attigny
- Intercommunality: Argonne Ardennaise

Government
  - Mayor (2020–2026): Eladio Cerrajero
- Area^{1}: 5.91 km^{2} (2.28 sq mi)
- Elevation: 125 m (410 ft)
- Highest elevation: 178 m (584 ft)
- Lowest elevation: 107 m (351 ft)
- Population (2023): 36
  - Density: 6.1/km^{2} (16/sq mi)
- Time zone: UTC+01:00 (CET)
  - Summer (DST): UTC+02:00 (CEST)
- INSEE/Postal code: 08197 /08250
- ^{1} French Land Register data, which excludes lakes, ponds, glaciers > 1 km^{2} (0.386 sq mi or 247 acres) and river estuaries.

Grandham is a commune in the Ardennes department in northern France.

== Population ==
Historical population
Year	Pop.	±% p.a.
1968	72	—
1975	67	−1.02%
1982	48	−4.65%
1990	39	−2.56%
1999	49	+2.57%
2007	54	+1.22%
2012	55	+0.37%
2017	39	−6.64%
2023	36	−1.33%
Source: INSEE

== See also ==
- Communes of the Ardennes department
