= Beffu-et-le-Morthomme =

- Commune
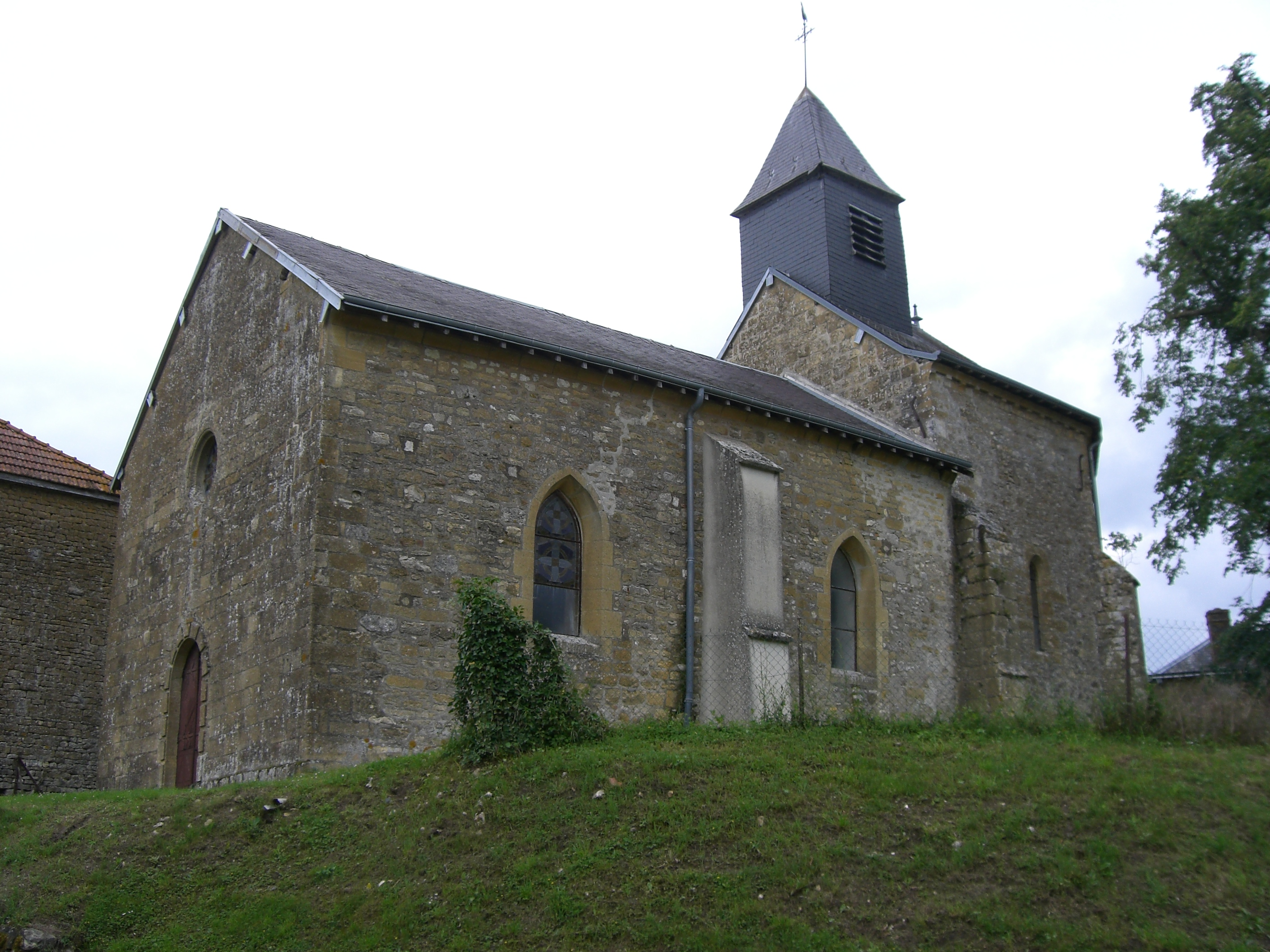
- The church in Beffu

- Coat of arms
- Location of Beffu-et-le-Morthomme
- Location within France Location within Grand Est
- Coordinates: 49°22′11″N 4°54′01″E
- Country: France
- Region: Grand Est
- Department: Ardennes
- Arrondissement: Vouziers
- Canton: Attigny
- Intercommunality: Argonne Ardennaise

Government
  - Mayor (2020–2026): Laëtitia Marcheras
- Area^{1}: 5.49 km^{2} (2.12 sq mi)
- Elevation: 170 m (560 ft)
- Highest elevation: 247 m (810 ft)
- Lowest elevation: 147 m (482 ft)
- Population (2023): 43
  - Density: 7.8/km^{2} (20/sq mi)
- Time zone: UTC+01:00 (CET)
  - Summer (DST): UTC+02:00 (CEST)
- INSEE/Postal code: 08056 /08250
- ^{1} French Land Register data, which excludes lakes, ponds, glaciers > 1 km^{2} (0.386 sq mi or 247 acres) and river estuaries.

Beffu-et-le-Morthomme (French pronunciation: [bɛfy e lə mɔʁtɔm]) is a commune in the Ardennes department in northern France.

== Population ==
Historical population
Year	Pop.	±% p.a.
1968	80	—
1975	57	−4.73%
1982	51	−1.58%
1990	60	+2.05%
1999	54	−1.16%
2007	72	+3.66%
2012	69	−0.85%
2017	48	−7.00%
2023	43	−1.82%
Source: INSEE

== See also ==
- Communes of the Ardennes department
