= Quilly, Ardennes =

Quilly
- Commune
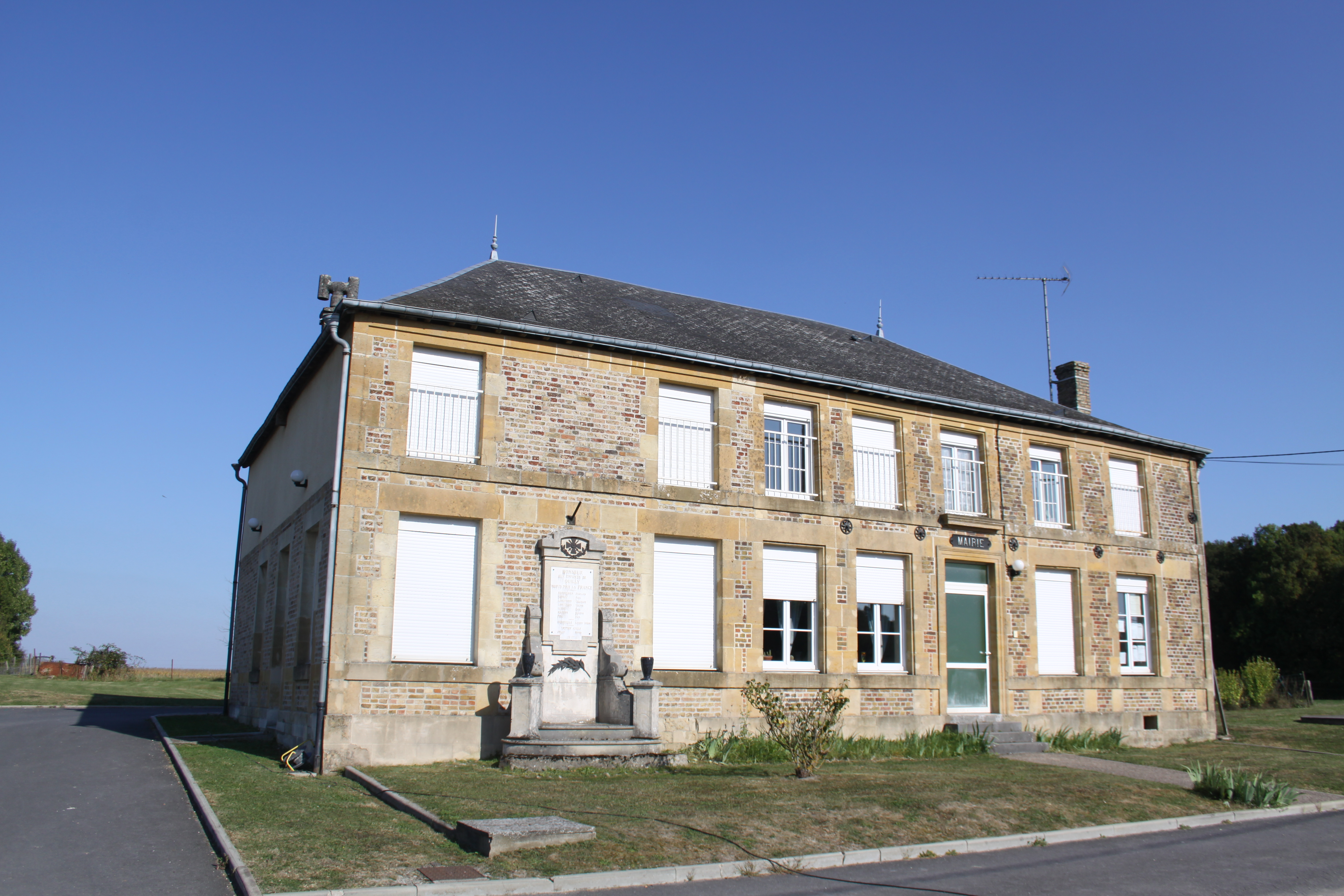
- Town hall
- Location of Quilly
- Location within France Location within Grand Est
- Coordinates: 49°24′30″N 4°36′00″E
- Country: France
- Region: Grand Est
- Department: Ardennes
- Arrondissement: Vouziers
- Canton: Attigny
- Intercommunality: Argonne Ardennaise

Government
  - Mayor (2020–2026): Jérôme Hardy
- Area^{1}: 5.49 km^{2} (2.12 sq mi)
- Elevation: 115 m (377 ft)
- Highest elevation: 177 m (581 ft)
- Lowest elevation: 101 m (331 ft)
- Population (2023): 64
  - Density: 12/km^{2} (30/sq mi)
- Time zone: UTC+01:00 (CET)
  - Summer (DST): UTC+02:00 (CEST)
- INSEE/Postal code: 08351 /08400
- ^{1} French Land Register data, which excludes lakes, ponds, glaciers > 1 km^{2} (0.386 sq mi or 247 acres) and river estuaries.

Quilly (French pronunciation: [kiji]) is a commune in the Ardennes department in northern France.

== Population ==
Historical population
| Year | Pop. | ±% p.a. |
|---|---|---|
| 1968 | 76 | — |
| 1975 | 65 | −2.21% |
| 1982 | 83 | +3.55% |
| 1990 | 79 | −0.62% |
| 1999 | 65 | −2.14% |
| 2007 | 82 | +2.95% |
| 2012 | 85 | +0.72% |
| 2017 | 82 | −0.72% |
| 2023 | 64 | −4.05% |
Source: INSEE

== See also ==
- Communes of the Ardennes department
