= Bourcq =

- Commune
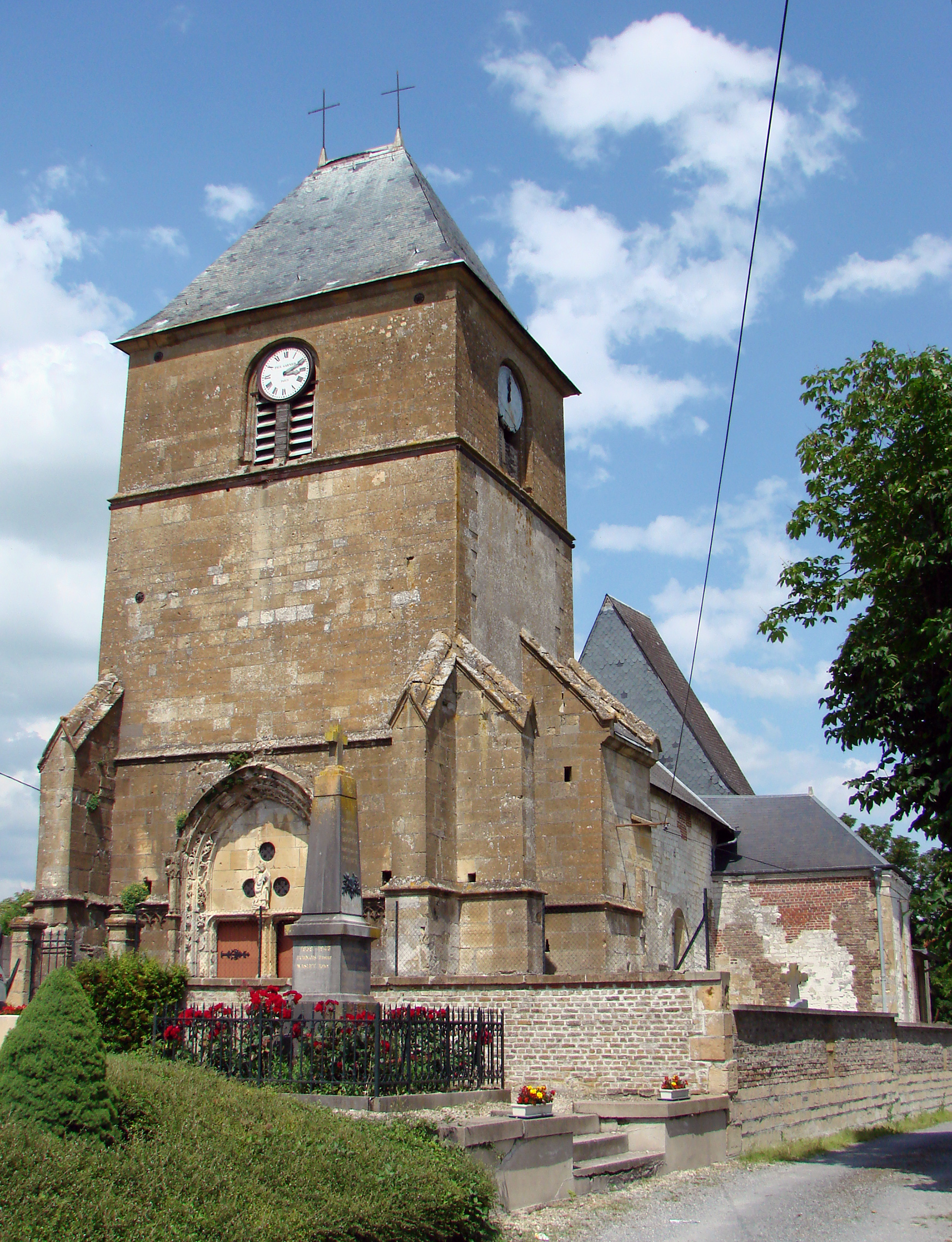
- The church in Bourcq

- Coat of arms
- Location of Bourcq
- Location within France Location within Grand Est
- Coordinates: 49°23′09″N 4°37′59″E
- Country: France
- Region: Grand Est
- Department: Ardennes
- Arrondissement: Vouziers
- Canton: Attigny
- Intercommunality: Argonne Ardennaise

Government
  - Mayor (2020–2026): Mathieu Bouillon
- Area^{1}: 9.85 km^{2} (3.80 sq mi)
- Elevation: 170 m (560 ft)
- Highest elevation: 181 m (594 ft)
- Lowest elevation: 104 m (341 ft)
- Population (2023): 53
  - Density: 5.4/km^{2} (14/sq mi)
- Time zone: UTC+01:00 (CET)
  - Summer (DST): UTC+02:00 (CEST)
- INSEE/Postal code: 08077 /08400
- ^{1} French Land Register data, which excludes lakes, ponds, glaciers > 1 km^{2} (0.386 sq mi or 247 acres) and river estuaries.

Bourcq (French pronunciation: [buʁk]) is a commune in the Ardennes department in the Grand Est region of northern France.

== Population ==
Historical population
Year	Pop.	±% p.a.
1968	94	—
1975	79	−2.45%
1982	79	+0.00%
1990	76	−0.48%
1999	70	−0.91%
2007	58	−2.32%
2012	58	+0.00%
2017	52	−2.16%
2023	53	+0.32%
Source: INSEE

== See also ==
- Communes of the Ardennes department
