= Marvaux-Vieux =

- Commune
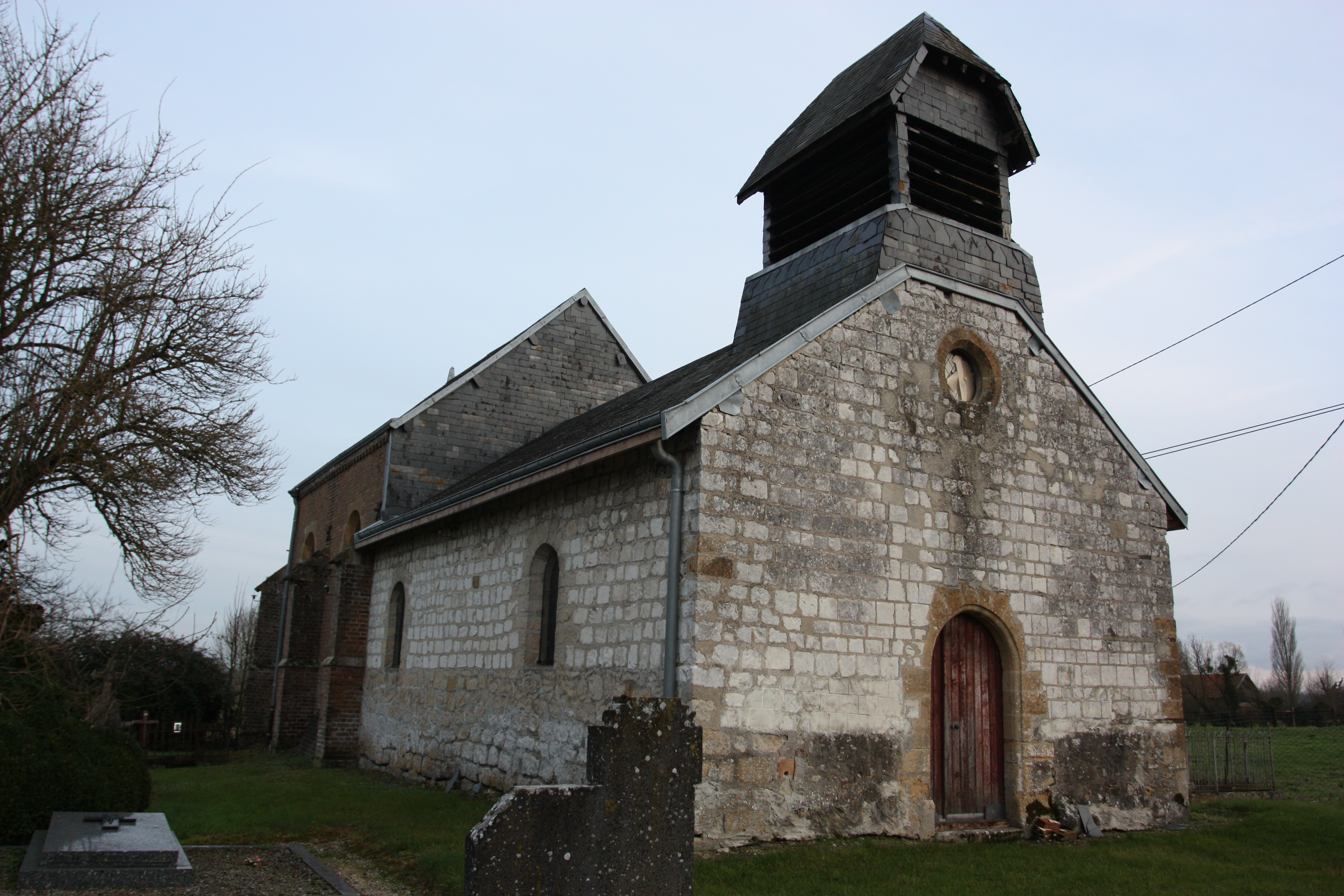
- The church in Marvaux-Vieux
- Location of Marvaux-Vieux
- Location within France Location within Grand Est
- Coordinates: 49°17′26″N 4°40′52″E
- Country: France
- Region: Grand Est
- Department: Ardennes
- Arrondissement: Vouziers
- Canton: Attigny
- Intercommunality: Argonne Ardennaise

Government
  - Mayor (2020–2026): Dominique Robin
- Area^{1}: 11.61 km^{2} (4.48 sq mi)
- Elevation: 114 m (374 ft)
- Population (2023): 69
  - Density: 5.9/km^{2} (15/sq mi)
- Time zone: UTC+01:00 (CET)
  - Summer (DST): UTC+02:00 (CEST)
- INSEE/Postal code: 08280 /08400
- ^{1} French Land Register data, which excludes lakes, ponds, glaciers > 1 km^{2} (0.386 sq mi or 247 acres) and river estuaries.

Marvaux-Vieux (French pronunciation: [maʁvo vjø]) is a commune in the Ardennes department in northern France.

== Population ==
Historical population
| Year | Pop. | ±% p.a. |
|---|---|---|
| 1968 | 136 | — |
| 1975 | 118 | −2.01% |
| 1982 | 113 | −0.62% |
| 1990 | 89 | −2.94% |
| 1999 | 73 | −2.18% |
| 2007 | 67 | −1.07% |
| 2012 | 76 | +2.55% |
| 2017 | 73 | −0.80% |
| 2023 | 69 | −0.93% |
Source: INSEE

== See also ==
- Communes of the Ardennes department
