= Olizy-Primat =

- Commune
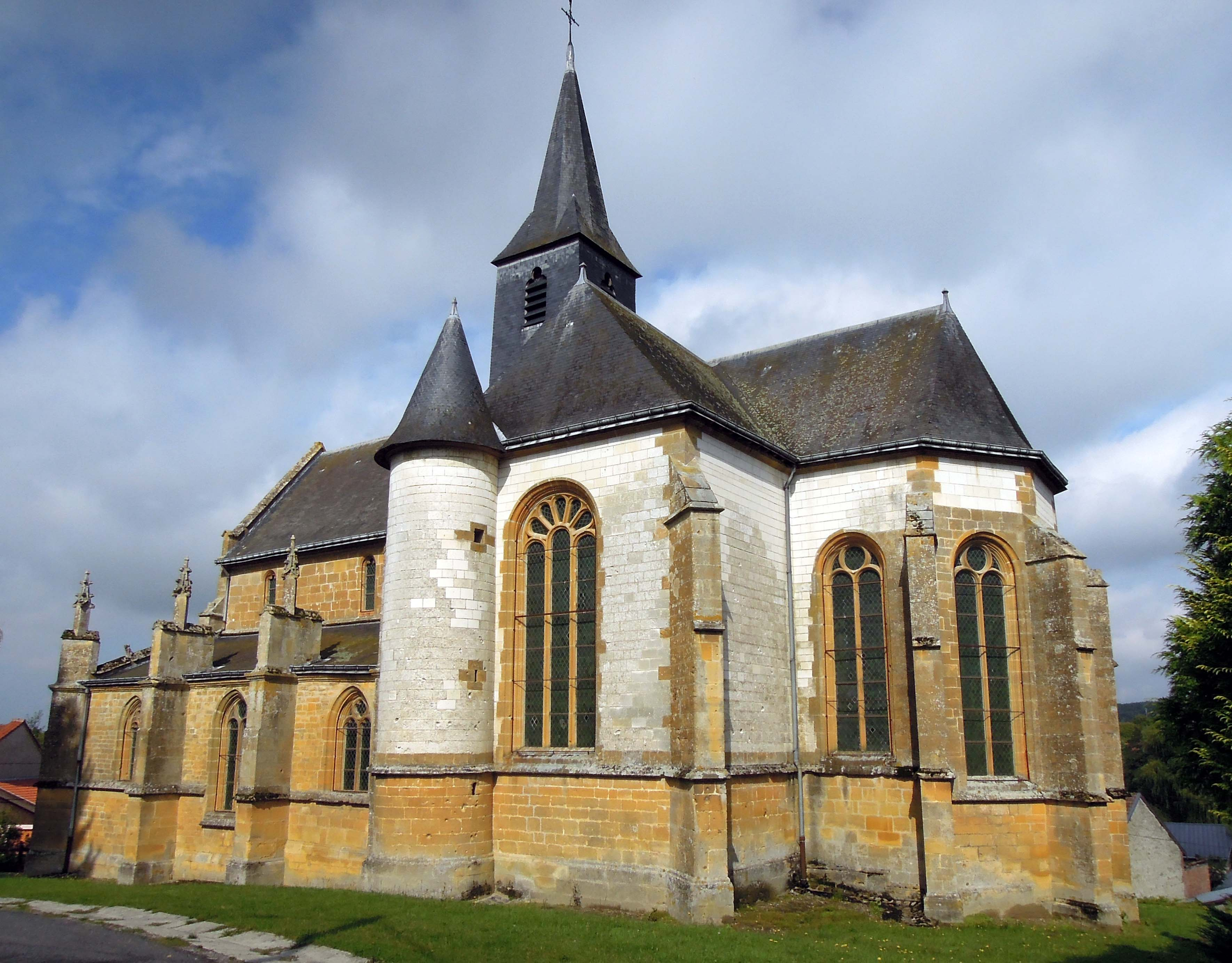
- The church in Olizy-Primat

- Coat of arms
- Location of Olizy-Primat
- Location within France Location within Grand Est
- Coordinates: 49°20′50″N 4°46′37″E
- Country: France
- Region: Grand Est
- Department: Ardennes
- Arrondissement: Vouziers
- Canton: Attigny
- Intercommunality: Argonne Ardennaise

Government
  - Mayor (2020–2026): Lionel Vairy
- Area^{1}: 21.35 km^{2} (8.24 sq mi)
- Elevation: 125 m (410 ft)
- Highest elevation: 221 m (725 ft)
- Lowest elevation: 96 m (315 ft)
- Population (2023): 223
  - Density: 10.4/km^{2} (27.1/sq mi)
- Time zone: UTC+01:00 (CET)
  - Summer (DST): UTC+02:00 (CEST)
- INSEE/Postal code: 08333 /08250
- ^{1} French Land Register data, which excludes lakes, ponds, glaciers > 1 km^{2} (0.386 sq mi or 247 acres) and river estuaries.

Olizy-Primat (French pronunciation: [ɔlizi pʁima]) is a commune in the Ardennes department in northern France.

== Population ==
Historical population
Year	Pop.	±% p.a.
1968	263	—
1975	213	−2.97%
1982	231	+1.17%
1990	204	−1.54%
1999	205	+0.05%
2007	223	+1.06%
2012	217	−0.54%
2017	234	+1.52%
2023	223	−0.80%
Source: INSEE

== See also ==
- Communes of the Ardennes department
