= Marquigny =

- Commune
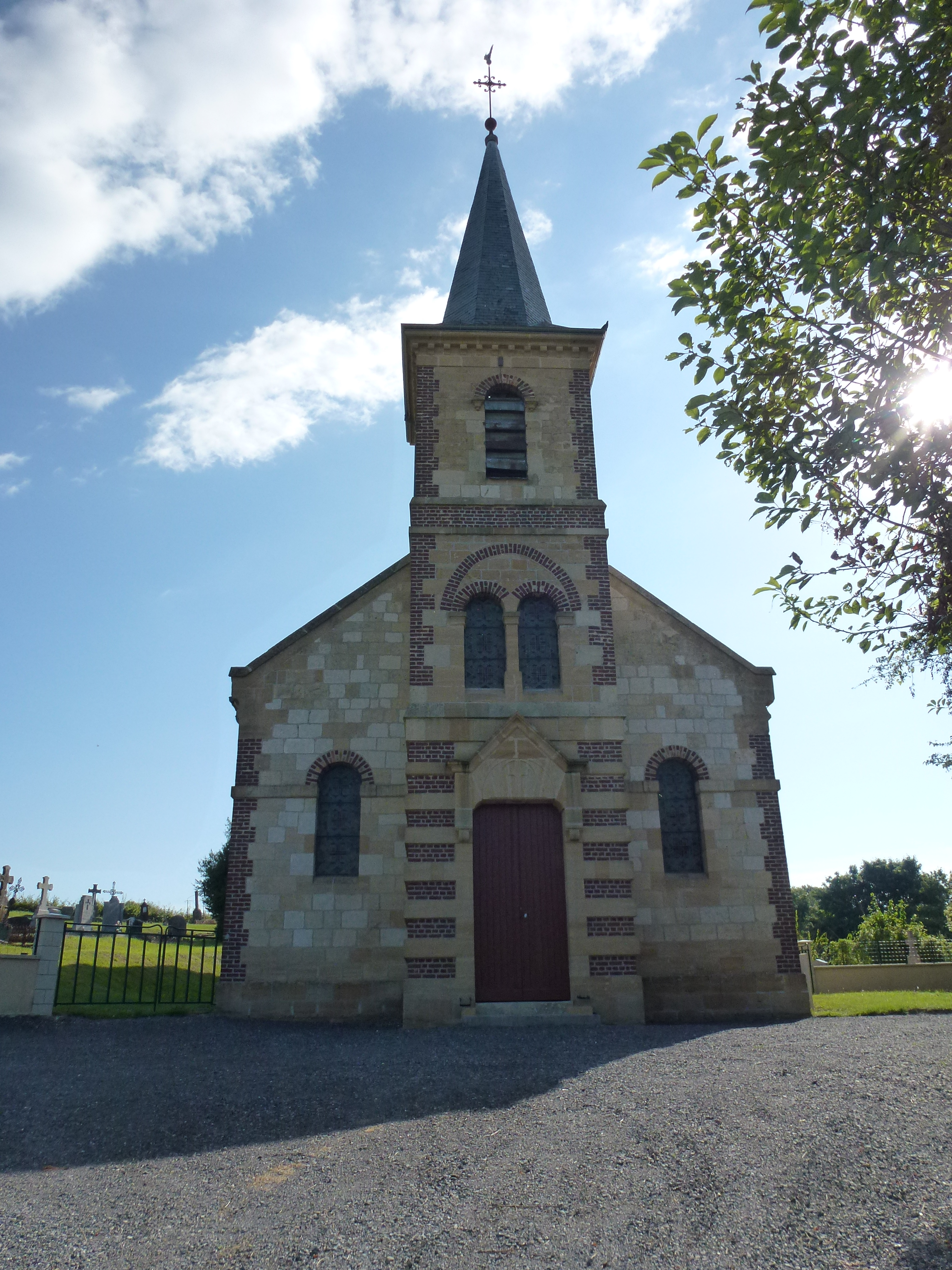
- The church in Marquigny

- Coat of arms
- Location of Marquigny
- Location within France Location within Grand Est
- Coordinates: 49°33′08″N 4°42′27″E
- Country: France
- Region: Grand Est
- Department: Ardennes
- Arrondissement: Vouziers
- Canton: Attigny
- Intercommunality: Crêtes Préardennaises

Government
  - Mayor (2020–2026): Jean-Luc Sauce
- Area^{1}: 6.65 km^{2} (2.57 sq mi)
- Elevation: 223 m (732 ft)
- Population (2023): 71
  - Density: 11/km^{2} (28/sq mi)
- Time zone: UTC+01:00 (CET)
  - Summer (DST): UTC+02:00 (CEST)
- INSEE/Postal code: 08278 /08390
- ^{1} French Land Register data, which excludes lakes, ponds, glaciers > 1 km^{2} (0.386 sq mi or 247 acres) and river estuaries.

Marquigny (French pronunciation: [maʁkiɲi]) is a commune in the Ardennes department in northern France.

== Population ==
Historical population
Year	Pop.	±% p.a.
1968	100	—
1975	87	−1.97%
1982	70	−3.06%
1990	64	−1.11%
1999	65	+0.17%
2007	66	+0.19%
2012	89	+6.16%
2017	84	−1.15%
2023	71	−2.76%
Source: INSEE

== See also ==
- Communes of the Ardennes department
