= Contreuve =

- Commune
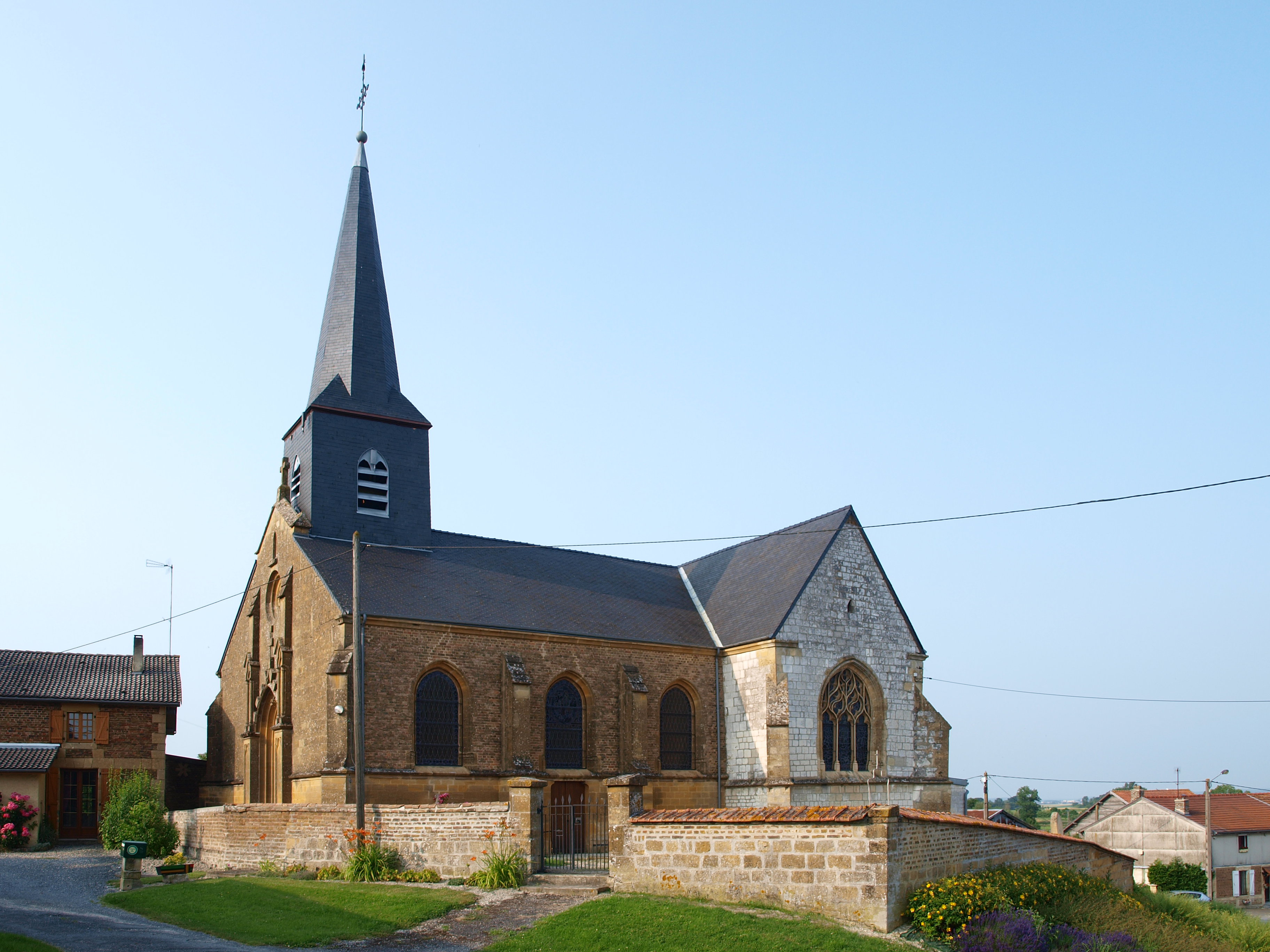
- The church in Contreuve
- Location of Contreuve
- Location within France Location within Grand Est
- Coordinates: 49°21′45″N 4°37′31″E
- Country: France
- Region: Grand Est
- Department: Ardennes
- Arrondissement: Vouziers
- Canton: Attigny
- Intercommunality: Argonne Ardennaise

Government
  - Mayor (2020–2026): Francis Mouton
- Area^{1}: 11.02 km^{2} (4.25 sq mi)
- Elevation: 120 m (390 ft)
- Population (2023): 87
  - Density: 7.9/km^{2} (20/sq mi)
- Time zone: UTC+01:00 (CET)
  - Summer (DST): UTC+02:00 (CEST)
- INSEE/Postal code: 08130 /08400
- ^{1} French Land Register data, which excludes lakes, ponds, glaciers > 1 km^{2} (0.386 sq mi or 247 acres) and river estuaries.

Contreuve (French pronunciation: [kɔ̃tʁœv]) is a commune in the Ardennes department in northern France.

== Population ==
Historical population
Year	Pop.	±% p.a.
1968	118	—
1975	94	−3.20%
1982	77	−2.81%
1990	70	−1.18%
1999	73	+0.47%
2007	70	−0.52%
2012	60	−3.04%
2017	80	+5.92%
2023	87	+1.41%
Source: INSEE

== See also ==
- Communes of the Ardennes department
