= Jonval =

- Commune
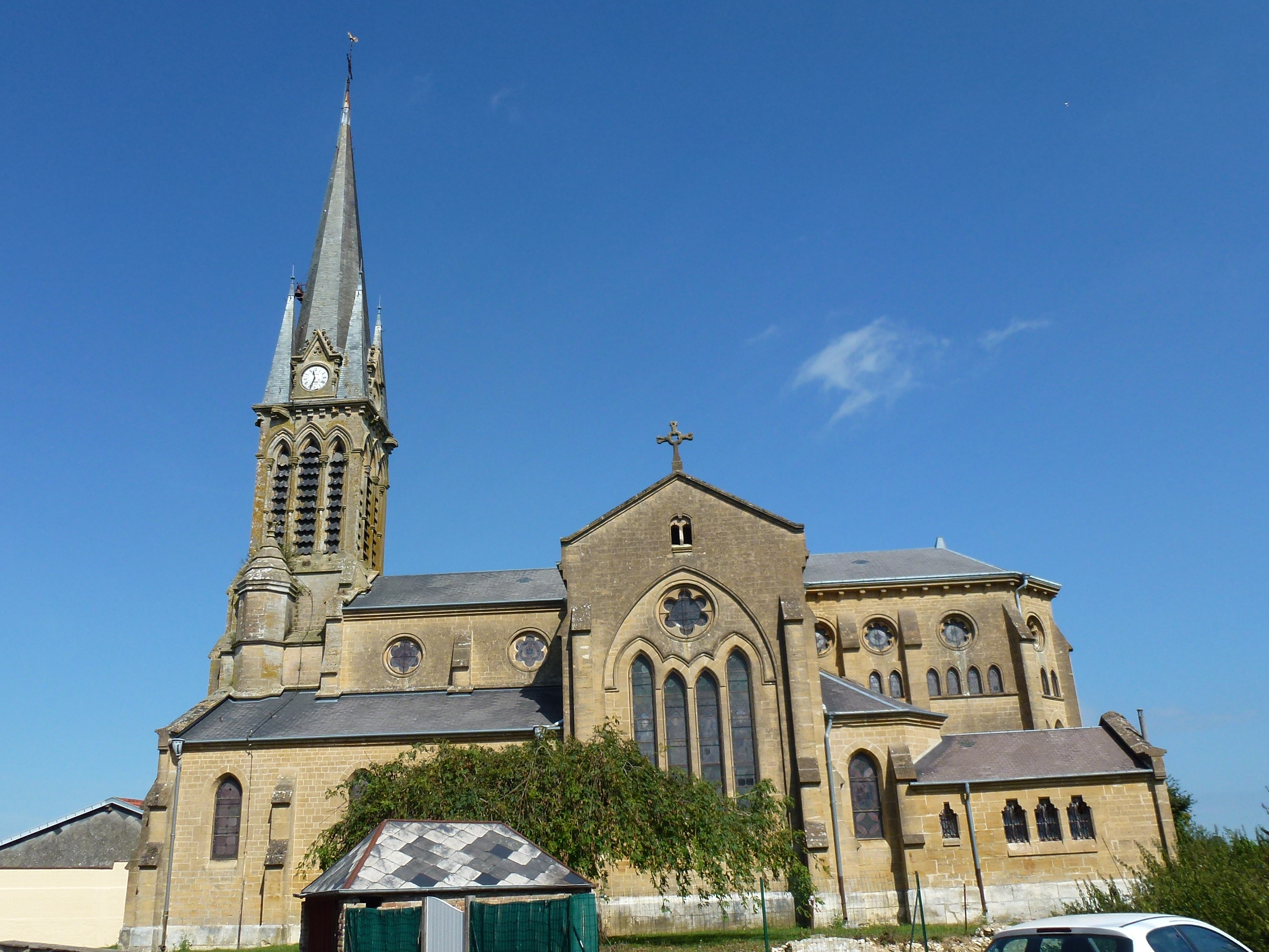
- The church in Jonval
- Location of Jonval
- Location within France Location within Grand Est
- Coordinates: 49°34′21″N 4°39′56″E
- Country: France
- Region: Grand Est
- Department: Ardennes
- Arrondissement: Vouziers
- Canton: Attigny
- Intercommunality: Crêtes Préardennaises

Government
  - Mayor (2020–2026): Stéphanie Mathy
- Area^{1}: 2.53 km^{2} (0.98 sq mi)
- Elevation: 228 m (748 ft)
- Population (2023): 88
  - Density: 35/km^{2} (90/sq mi)
- Time zone: UTC+01:00 (CET)
  - Summer (DST): UTC+02:00 (CEST)
- INSEE/Postal code: 08238 /08130
- ^{1} French Land Register data, which excludes lakes, ponds, glaciers > 1 km^{2} (0.386 sq mi or 247 acres) and river estuaries.

Jonval (French pronunciation: [ʒɔ̃val]) is a commune in the Ardennes department in northern France.

== Population ==
Historical population
Year	Pop.	±% p.a.
1968	92	—
1975	90	−0.31%
1982	99	+1.37%
1990	90	−1.18%
1999	81	−1.16%
2007	81	+0.00%
2012	87	+1.44%
2017	98	+2.41%
2023	88	−1.78%
Source: INSEE

== See also ==
- Communes of the Ardennes department
