= Suzanne, Ardennes =

Suzanne
- Commune
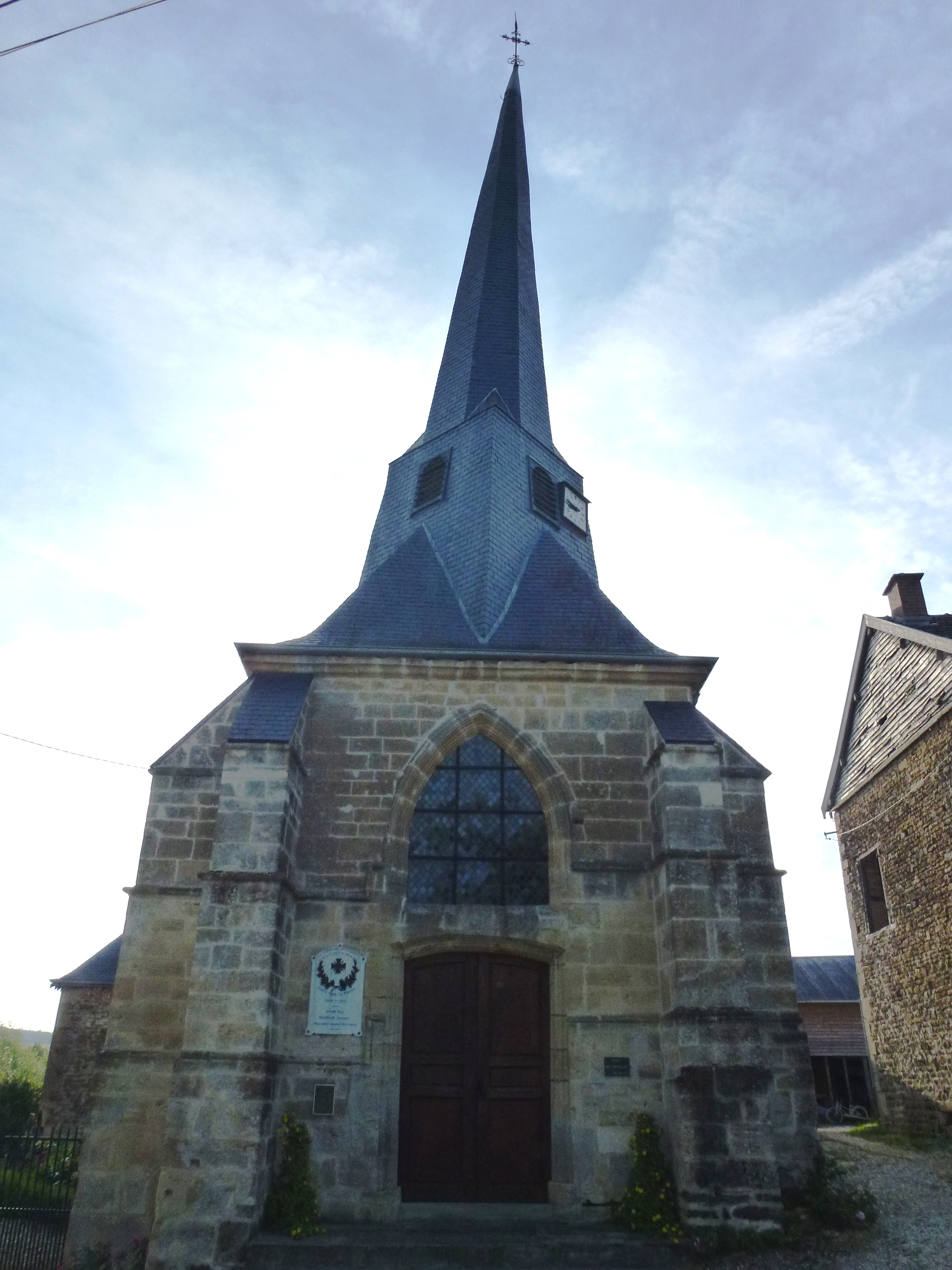
- The church in Suzanne

- Coat of arms
- Location of Suzanne
- Location within France Location within Grand Est
- Coordinates: 49°31′01″N 4°38′06″E
- Country: France
- Region: Grand Est
- Department: Ardennes
- Arrondissement: Vouziers
- Canton: Attigny
- Intercommunality: Crêtes Préardennaises

Government
  - Mayor (2020–2026): Benoît Deletang
- Area^{1}: 6.45 km^{2} (2.49 sq mi)
- Elevation: 130 m (430 ft)
- Population (2023): 54
  - Density: 8.4/km^{2} (22/sq mi)
- Time zone: UTC+01:00 (CET)
  - Summer (DST): UTC+02:00 (CEST)
- INSEE/Postal code: 08433 /08130
- ^{1} French Land Register data, which excludes lakes, ponds, glaciers > 1 km^{2} (0.386 sq mi or 247 acres) and river estuaries.

Suzanne is a commune in the Ardennes department in northern France.

== Population ==
Historical population
Year	Pop.	±% p.a.
1968	113	—
1975	95	−2.45%
1982	72	−3.88%
1990	60	−2.25%
1999	61	+0.18%
2007	58	−0.63%
2012	69	+3.53%
2017	64	−1.49%
2023	54	−2.79%
Source: INSEE

== See also ==
- Communes of the Ardennes department
