= Sainte-Vaubourg =

- Commune
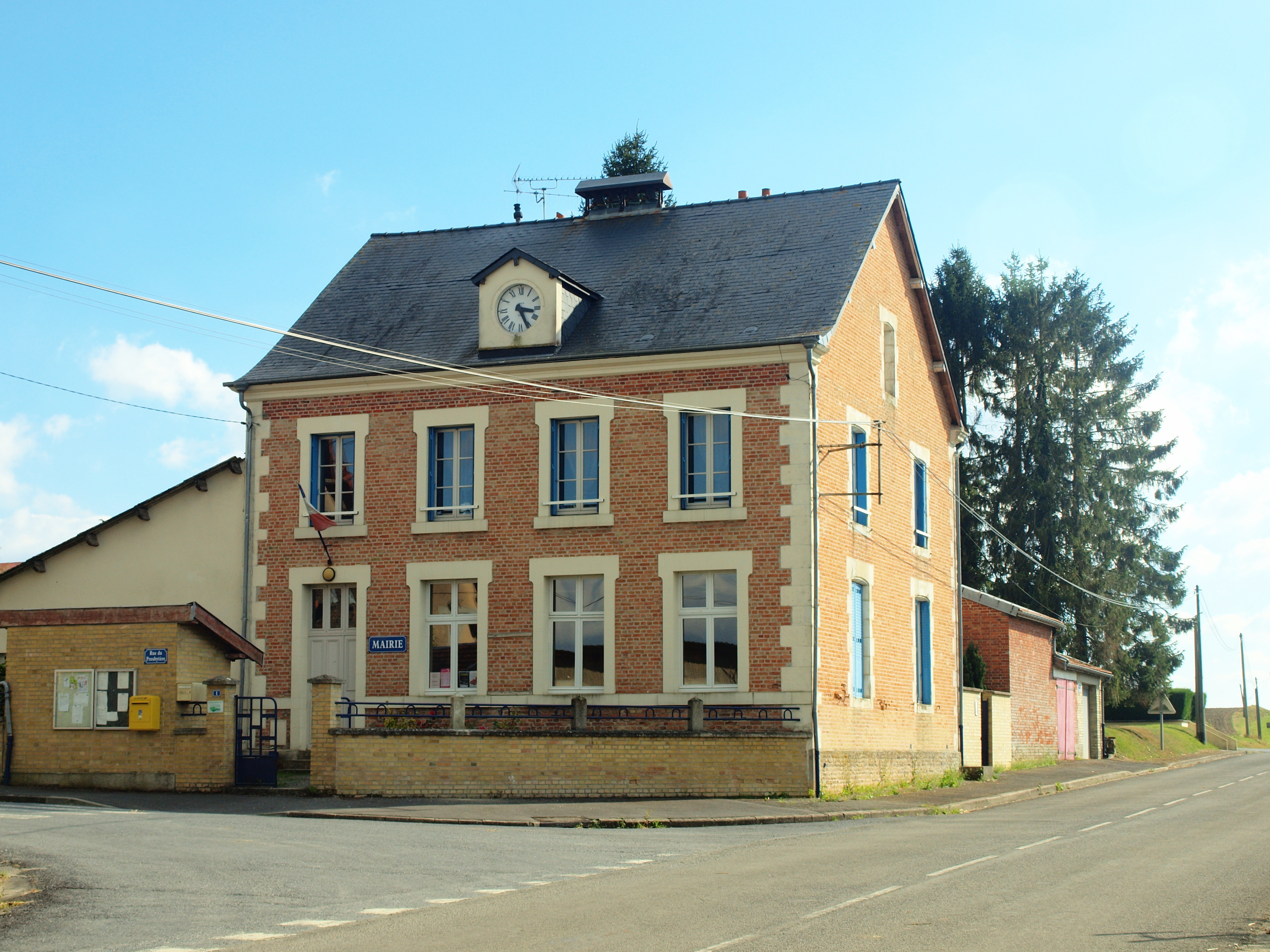
- The town hall in Sainte-Vaubourg
- Location of Sainte-Vaubourg
- Location within France Location within Grand Est
- Coordinates: 49°27′42″N 4°35′24″E
- Country: France
- Region: Grand Est
- Department: Ardennes
- Arrondissement: Vouziers
- Canton: Attigny
- Intercommunality: Crêtes Préardennaises

Government
  - Mayor (2020–2026): Jean-Luc Guerin
- Area^{1}: 6.91 km^{2} (2.67 sq mi)
- Elevation: 100 m (330 ft)
- Highest elevation: 110 m (360 ft)
- Lowest elevation: 89 m (292 ft)
- Population (2023): 79
  - Density: 11/km^{2} (30/sq mi)
- Time zone: UTC+01:00 (CET)
  - Summer (DST): UTC+02:00 (CEST)
- INSEE/Postal code: 08398 /08130
- ^{1} French Land Register data, which excludes lakes, ponds, glaciers > 1 km^{2} (0.386 sq mi or 247 acres) and river estuaries.

Sainte-Vaubourg (French pronunciation: [sɛ̃t vobuʁ]) is a commune in the Ardennes department in northern France.

== Population ==
Historical population
Year	Pop.	±% p.a.
1968	116	—
1975	117	+0.12%
1982	93	−3.23%
1990	102	+1.16%
1999	92	−1.14%
2007	95	+0.40%
2012	88	−1.52%
2017	87	−0.23%
2023	79	−1.59%
Source: INSEE

== See also ==
- Communes of the Ardennes department
