= La Sabotterie =

- Commune
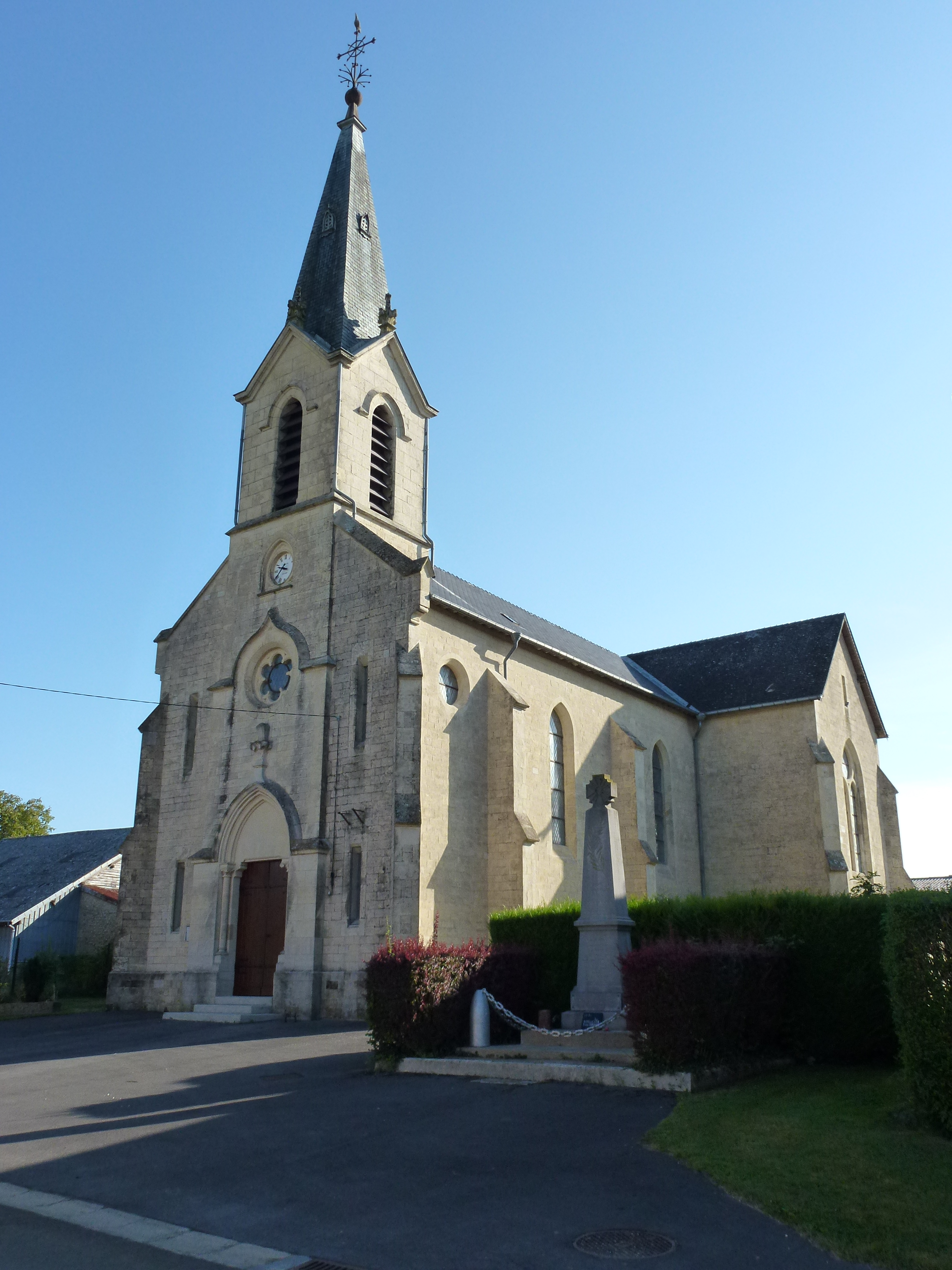
- The church in La Sabotterie

- Coat of arms
- Location of La Sabotterie
- Location within France Location within Grand Est
- Coordinates: 49°32′48″N 4°40′18″E
- Country: France
- Region: Grand Est
- Department: Ardennes
- Arrondissement: Vouziers
- Canton: Attigny
- Intercommunality: Crêtes Préardennaises

Government
  - Mayor (2020–2026): Marie Baumel
- Area^{1}: 3.64 km^{2} (1.41 sq mi)
- Elevation: 209 m (686 ft)
- Highest elevation: 220 m (720 ft)
- Lowest elevation: 202 m (663 ft)
- Population (2023): 130
  - Density: 36/km^{2} (92/sq mi)
- Time zone: UTC+01:00 (CET)
  - Summer (DST): UTC+02:00 (CEST)
- INSEE/Postal code: 08374 /08130
- ^{1} French Land Register data, which excludes lakes, ponds, glaciers > 1 km^{2} (0.386 sq mi or 247 acres) and river estuaries.

La Sabotterie (French pronunciation: [la sabɔtʁi]) is a commune in the Ardennes department in northern France.

== Population ==
Historical population
| Year | Pop. | ±% p.a. |
|---|---|---|
| 1968 | 119 | — |
| 1975 | 92 | −3.61% |
| 1982 | 84 | −1.29% |
| 1990 | 97 | +1.81% |
| 1999 | 92 | −0.59% |
| 2007 | 90 | −0.27% |
| 2012 | 75 | −3.58% |
| 2017 | 112 | +8.35% |
| 2023 | 130 | +2.52% |
Source: INSEE

== See also ==
- Communes of the Ardennes department
