= Mont-Saint-Martin, Ardennes =

Mont-Saint-Martin
- Commune
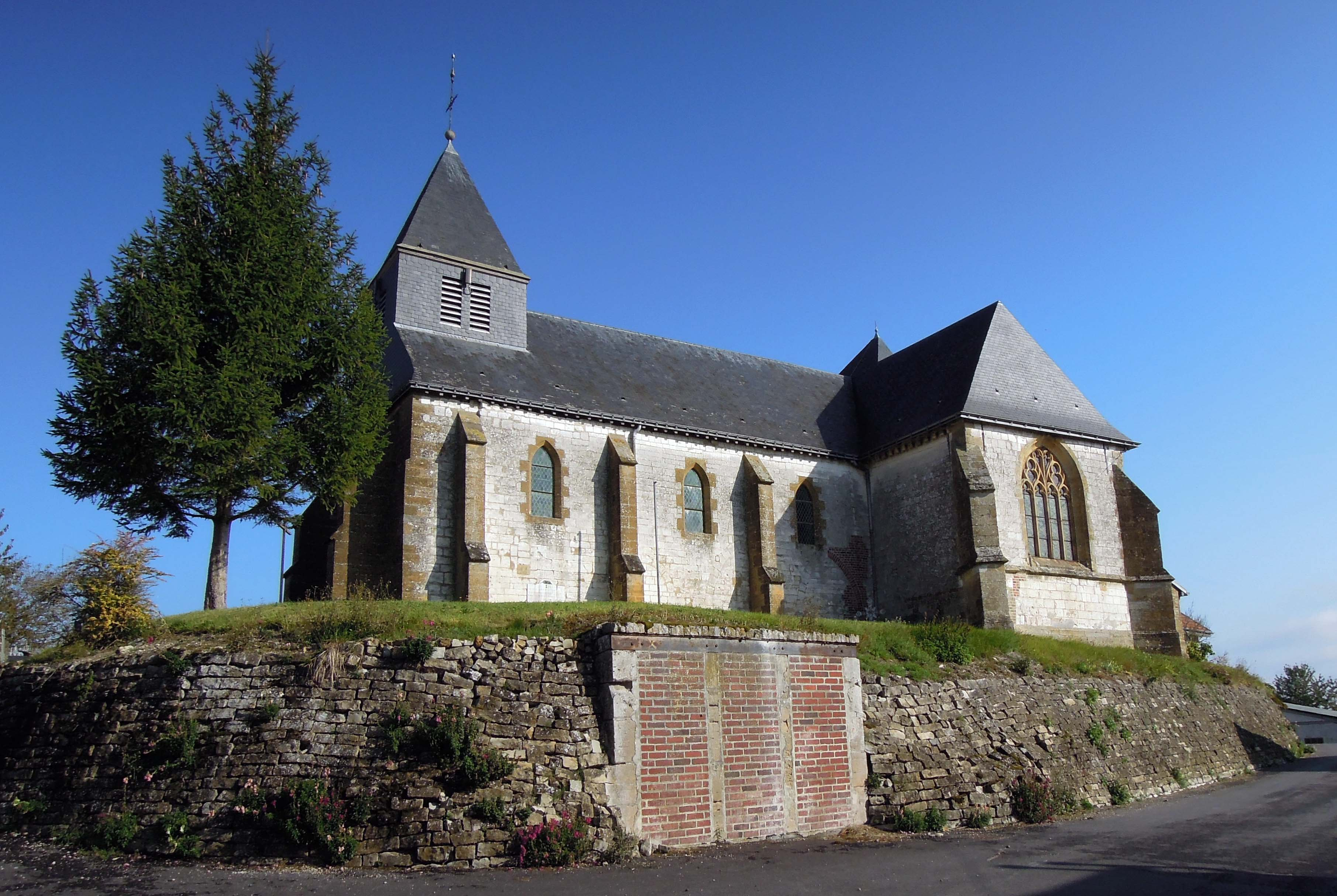
- The church in Mont-Saint-Martin
- Location of Mont-Saint-Martin
- Location within France Location within Grand Est
- Coordinates: 49°20′10″N 4°38′54″E
- Country: France
- Region: Grand Est
- Department: Ardennes
- Arrondissement: Vouziers
- Canton: Attigny
- Intercommunality: Argonne Ardennaise

Government
  - Mayor (2020–2026): Gilles Lejeune
- Area^{1}: 13.95 km^{2} (5.39 sq mi)
- Elevation: 1,202 m (3,944 ft)
- Population (2023): 88
  - Density: 6.3/km^{2} (16/sq mi)
- Time zone: UTC+01:00 (CET)
  - Summer (DST): UTC+02:00 (CEST)
- INSEE/Postal code: 08308 /08400
- ^{1} French Land Register data, which excludes lakes, ponds, glaciers > 1 km^{2} (0.386 sq mi or 247 acres) and river estuaries.

Mont-Saint-Martin (French pronunciation: [mɔ̃ sɛ̃ maʁtɛ̃]) is a commune in the Ardennes department in northern France.

== Population ==
Historical population
Year	Pop.	±% p.a.
1968	133	—
1975	118	−1.69%
1982	95	−3.05%
1990	83	−1.67%
1999	75	−1.12%
2007	83	+1.27%
2012	78	−1.23%
2017	83	+1.25%
2023	88	+0.98%
Source: INSEE

== See also ==
- Communes of the Ardennes department
