= Ardeuil-et-Montfauxelles =

- Commune
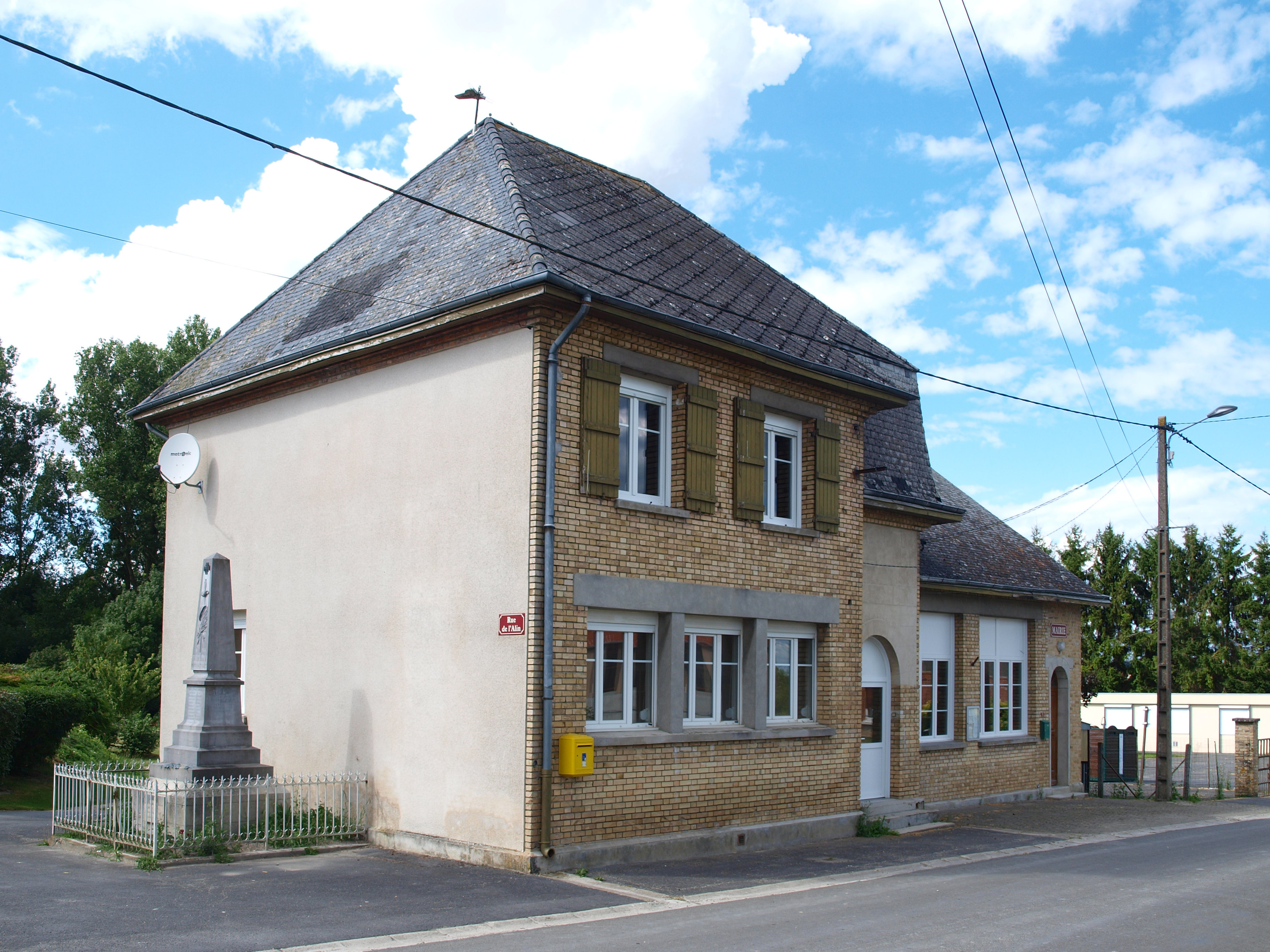
- The Town Hall
- Location of Ardeuil-et-Montfauxelles
- Location within France Location within Grand Est
- Coordinates: 49°16′08″N 4°42′27″E
- Country: France
- Region: Grand Est
- Department: Ardennes
- Arrondissement: Vouziers
- Canton: Attigny
- Intercommunality: Argonne Ardennaise

Government
  - Mayor (2020–2026): Fabrice Marchand
- Area^{1}: 4.28 km^{2} (1.65 sq mi)
- Elevation: 120 m (390 ft)
- Highest elevation: 179 m (587 ft)
- Lowest elevation: 109 m (358 ft)
- Population (2023): 79
  - Density: 18/km^{2} (48/sq mi)
- Time zone: UTC+01:00 (CET)
  - Summer (DST): UTC+02:00 (CEST)
- INSEE/Postal code: 08018 /08400
- ^{1} French Land Register data, which excludes lakes, ponds, glaciers > 1 km^{2} (0.386 sq mi or 247 acres) and river estuaries.

Ardeuil-et-Montfauxelles (French pronunciation: [aʁdœj e mɔ̃foksɛl]) is a commune in the Ardennes department in the Grand Est region of northern France.

== Geography ==
Ardeuil-et-Montfauxelles is located 25 km south of Vouziers and 16 km east by north-east of Sommepy-Tahure on the border with the Marne department, which border forms the southern border of the commune. Access is by road D6 from Manre in the west, passing through the commune and the village before continuing east to Montcheutin. The smaller D121 road goes from the village north-east to join the D21 south-east of Challerange. Apart from the two villages of Ardeuil and Montfauxelles the commune is entirely farmland.

The Allin river flows through the commune from west to north-east. It joins the Aisne river at Brécy-Brières.

== Administration ==
List of Successive Mayors

From	To	Name
1995	2014	Denis Noizet
2014	2020	Georges Pincon
2020	current	Fabrice Marchand

== Demography ==
The inhabitants of the commune are known as Ardeuillais or Ardeuillaises in French. The population data given in the table and graph below for 1821 and earlier refer to the former commune of Ardeuil.

Historical population

Year	Pop.	±% p.a.
1793	91	—
1821	109	+0.65%
1831	213	+6.93%
1846	191	−0.72%
1872	172	−0.40%
1901	164	−0.16%
1926	124	−1.11%
1946	121	−0.12%
1962	143	+1.05%

Year	Pop.	±% p.a.
1968	120	−2.88%
1975	91	−3.87%
1982	89	−0.32%
1990	91	+0.28%
1999	76	−1.98%
2007	89	+1.99%
2012	83	−1.39%
2017	68	−3.91%
2023	79	+2.53%

Source: EHESS and INSEE

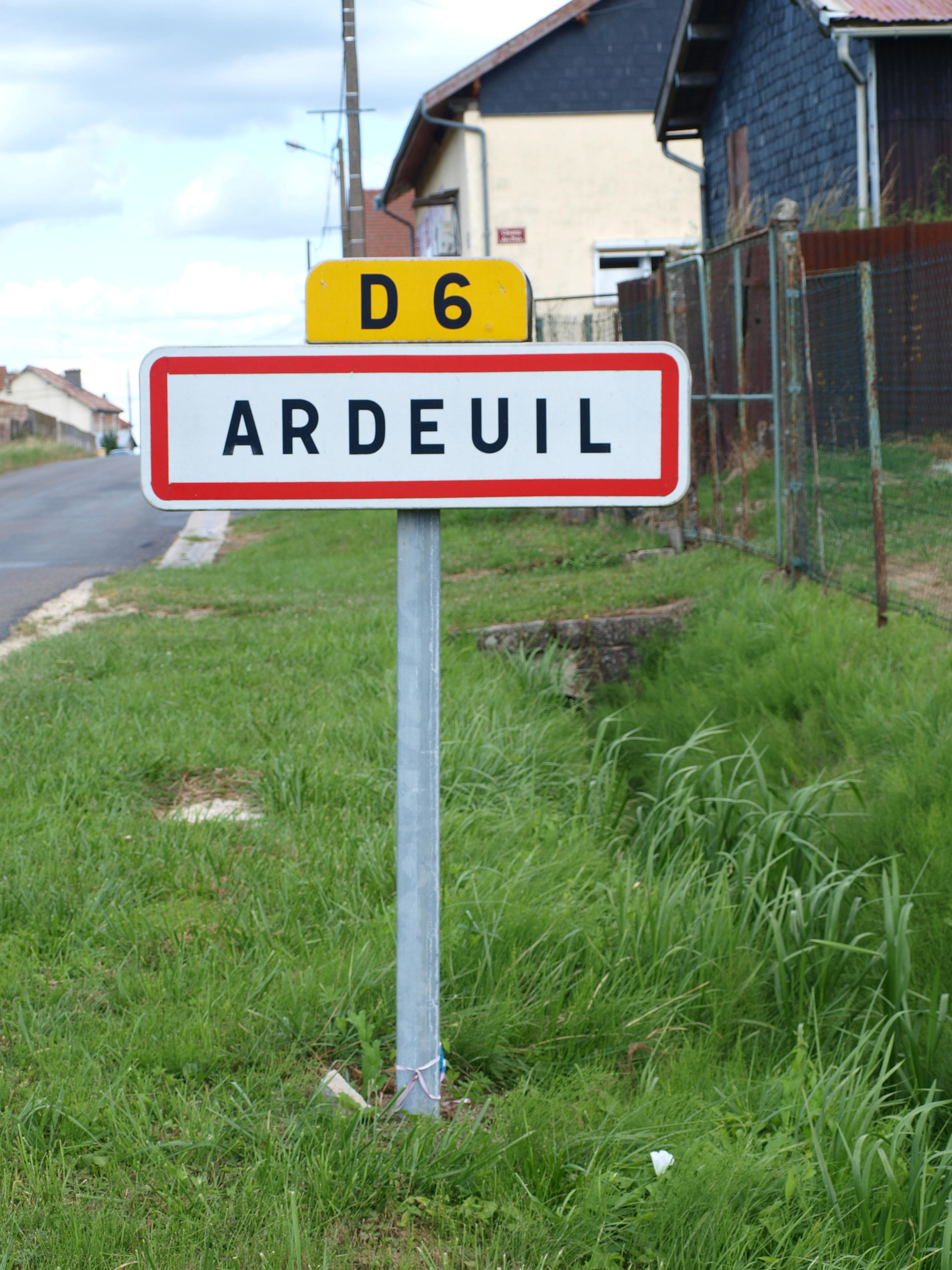
Entrance to Ardeuil

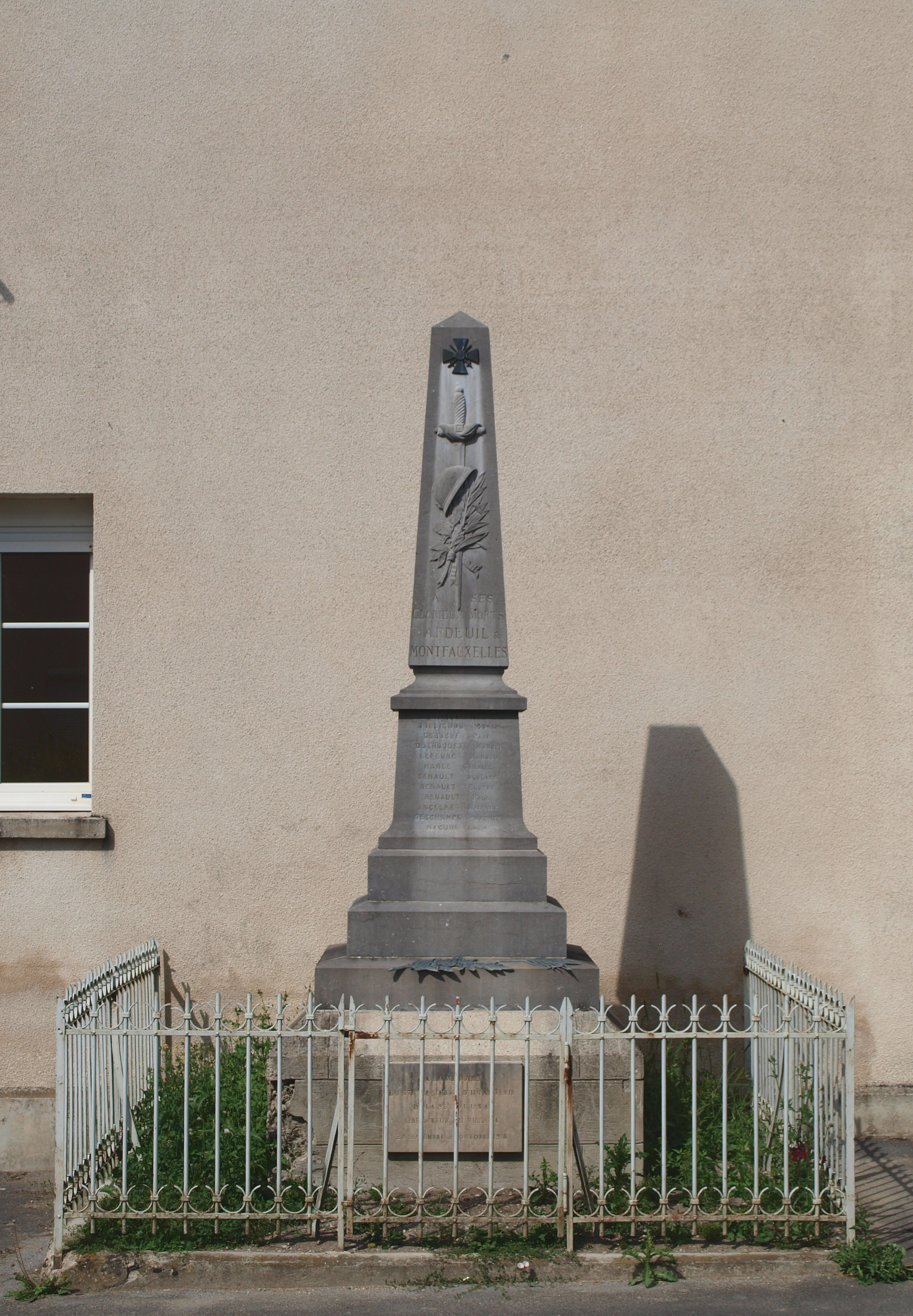
The War Memorial

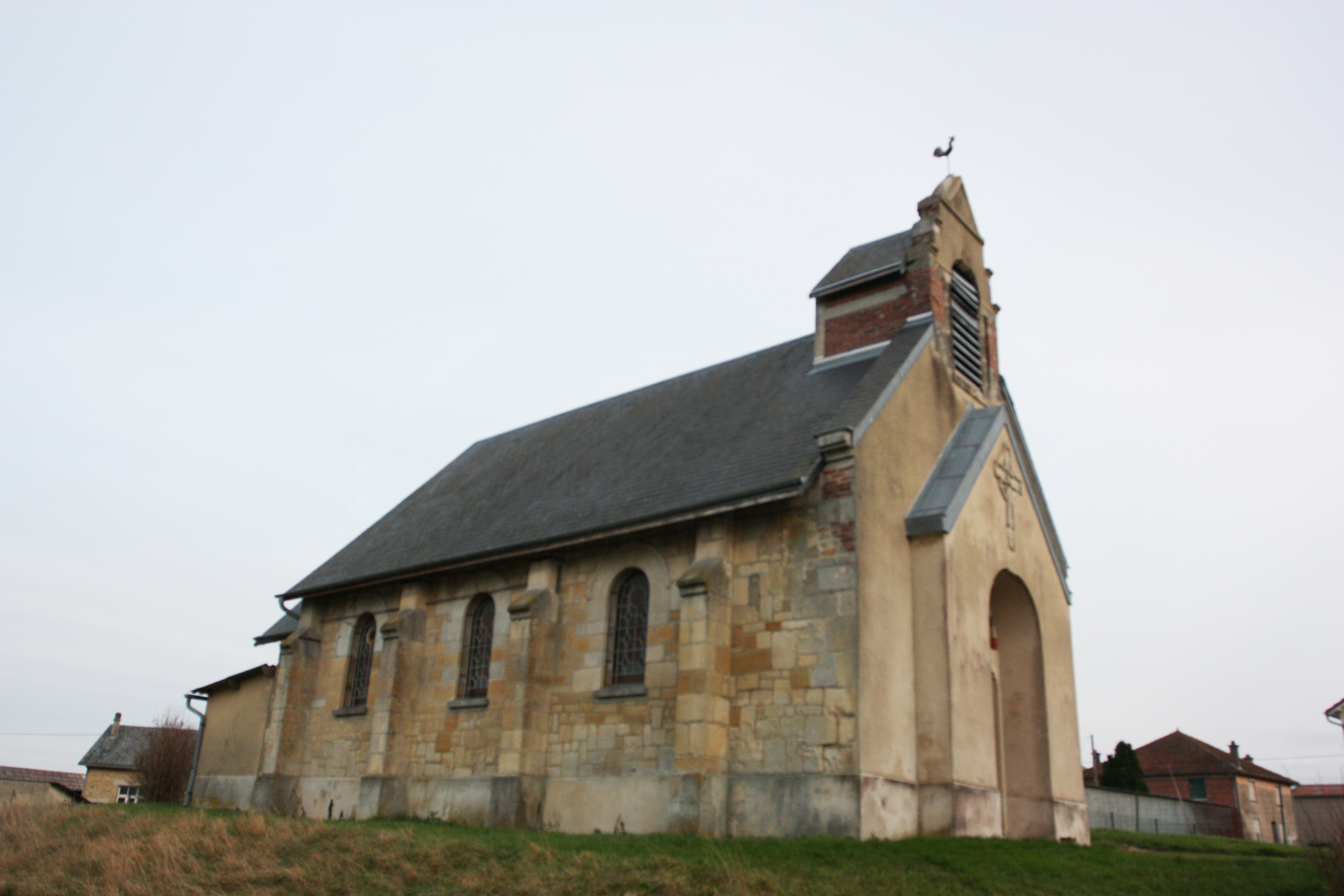
The Church

== See also ==
- Communes of the Ardennes department
