= Mouron (disambiguation) =

Mouron is a commune in the Ardennes department in northern France.

Mouron may also refer to:

- Dolpje Mouron (1901–1968), pseudonym "Cassandre", French painter, commercial poster artist, and typeface designer
- Didier Mouron (born 1958), Swiss artist (naturalized Canadian)
- Marie Magdelaine Mouron (fl.1690–96), French soldier
- Vaux-lès-Mouron, commune in the Ardennes department in northern France
- Mouron-sur-Yonne, commune in the Nièvre department in central France
