= Michel Veilande =

French soldier and politician (1767–1845)

Michel Veilande (16 October 1767, Manre (Ardennes) - 21 March 1845, Brières (Ardennes), was a brigadier of the First French Empire and more briefly a politician during the Restoration.

== Biography ==
=== Entry to the army ===
He entered service as a private in the Berwick regiment on 13 May 1786, due to how he performed as a private he rose up the ranks quickly.

=== Army of the Rhine ===
He moved to the 1st battalion of the 53rd line brigade, when it joined the 159th, which later became the 10th line brigade. He was in the campaigns from 1792 to 1796 in the Army of the Rhin, and distinguished himself in the retreat from the Palatinate, at the sieges of the bridgehead of Mannheim and Kehl, where he was one of the first to rush into the trenches of the enemies. For these two actions he was mentioned on the agenda of the siege army.

In 1796 he had a horse killed under him while battling in Rastatt. The same year, he distinguished himself in the battles of Biberach and Kinzetfeld.

=== Fighting in the Armies of England and Italy ===
He served in the campaign of 1797 with the English Army and later served campaigns with the Italian army in 1798 and 1799. In December 1799, he was appointed battalion commander in the 87th line regiment. On 29 March 1800, he commanded a battalion in the capture of the heights of Saint-Jacques-de-Ligoni, in Liguria and was seriously injured. He protected the retreat of the Grenier division after Novi on 15 August 1799.

He served in the 1801 campaign with the Army of the Grisons, and the following with the Army of Observation of the South. On 25 November 1803, he was appointed major of the 18th line regiment.

=== Reserve Army ===
In 1804 and 1805, he served in the reserve army. On 16 May 1806, he received the rank of colonel of the 88th line regiment, which he commanded on 14 October at the Battle of Jena, where he had a horse killed under him. He lost a second horse on 26 December at the Battle of Pułtusk, where, with less than 30 men, he saved the eagle of his regiment which was surrounded by a mass of Russian infantry and cavalry. He fought in Omeluff, Poland on 11 May 1807, losing a third horse. On 14 May 1807 he was created an officer of the Order of the Legion of Honor.

=== Fighting in the Spanish army. ===
From 1808 to 1812 he was in the Spanish army.

In 1808, when the titles were created, he was named Baron of the Empire, and on 10 March 1809, he was made a knight of the Order of the Iron Crown.

On 19 October 1809, he commanded a brigade at the Battle of Ocaña, his horse dying under him leaving a giant cut in his chest.

He was promoted to the rank of brigadier general on 28 December 1810. He was cited for his good conduct and bravery with honour in the army reports, for the sieges of Zaragoza, Badajoz and Campo-Maior, as well as the battles of Gebora and Albuera on 19 February and 16 May 1811, where two horses were killed under him. More citations he received was for the affairs of Puonte, Arzobispo and Villagarcia. At Croumena, General Veilande surprised the vanguard of the English army taking 120 horses and 93 men. On the night 6 April 1812, he was taken prisoner of war during the capture of Badajoz by the Anglo-Portuguese army.

=== Return to France ===
He was not released until 28 May 1814, after a harsh captivity, when her returned to France, being well received by the Restoration. He was named by the king a knight of the Royal and Military Order of Saint-Louis, and on 23 August, he was named Commander of the Order of the Legion of Honour.

=== Hundred Days ===
During the Hundred Days, he commanded a brigade of the Eastern Army of Observation. He retired as a Maréchal de camp on 18 October 1815.

=== Politician in the Restoration ===
On 8 March 1821, he was elected by the second district (Vouziers) of the Ardennes department to the Chamber of Deputies by 117 votes, replacing Louis Lefèvre-Gineau, who had opted to instead run for the district of Mézières. He took his place in the constitutional opposition and constantly voted with the liberals. He did not stand again in 1824.

=== July Monarchy ===
Veilande was reinstated into the reserves on 22 March 1831, definitively retiring on 1 May 1832.

He died in Brières (Ardennes) on 21 March 1845

== Different grades ==
- Entered service on 13 May 1786
- Quartermaster sergeant on 1 May 1789
- Sergeant major on 26 July 1789
- Adjutant-second lieutenant on 15 September 1791
- Lieutenant on 1 March 1792
- Captain of grenadiers on 28 November 1793
- Adjutant-major-captain on 14 February 1796
- Battalion commander on 7 December 1799
- Major on 25 November 1803
- Colonel on 16 May 1806
- Brigadier General on 28 December 1810
- Placed on inactive duty on 18 October 1815

== Decorations ==
- Legion of Honor
- Knight of the Legion of Honor, March 25, 1804.
- Officer of the Legion of Honor, May 14, 1807.
- Commander of the Legion of Honor, August 23, 1814.
- Knight of the Royal and Military Order of Saint-Louis, September 24, 1814[2].
- Knight of the Iron Crown, March 10, 1809.

== Title and coat of arms ==
He received the title of Baron of the Empire.

Coat of arms: Sable; a crenellated tower argent, masoned sable, surmounted on the right by a star or and accompanied by a horn or and a grenade of the same lit gules, quarter of the military barons; and for liveries: the colours of the shield.

== See also ==
- List of French generals of the Revolutionary and Napoleonic Wars

== Bibliography ==
- Jean-Baptiste-Joseph Boulliot, Biographie Ardennaise ou histoire des Ardennais, Paris, 1830, vol.2, p. 506-508 .
- Jean Baptiste Pierre Jullien, chevalier de Courcelles, Dictionnaire historique et biographique des généraux français, tome neuvième, Paris, 1833, p. 384. sur GoogleBooks
- « Michel Veilande », dans Adolphe Robert et Gaston Cougny, Dictionnaire des parlementaires français, Edgar Bourloton, 1889-1891 [détail de l’édition]
- Tulard, Jean (dir.), Dictionnaire Napoléon, Paris, Fayard, Volume 2 (I-Z), 1999, p. 924.
- Arthur Chuquet, « Le général baron Michel Veilande, de Manre », dans la Revue historique ardennaise, vol. 5, publiée par Paul Laurent, Paris : Librairie Alphonse Picard et fils, 1898, p. 320-326
