= Vaux-lès-Mouron =

- Commune
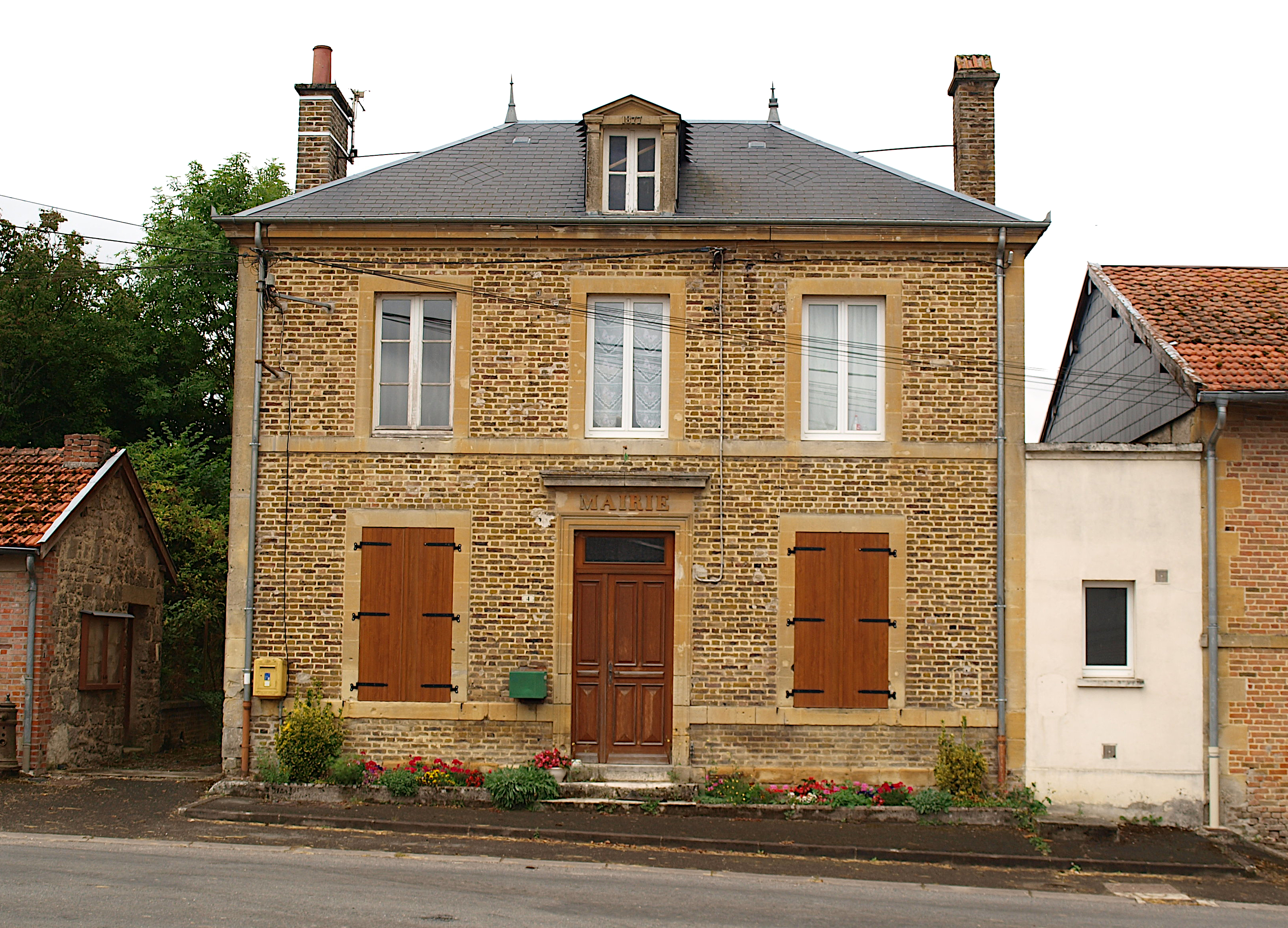
- The town hall in Vaux-lès-Mouron
- Location of Vaux-lès-Mouron
- Location within France Location within Grand Est
- Coordinates: 49°18′03″N 4°47′04″E
- Country: France
- Region: Grand Est
- Department: Ardennes
- Arrondissement: Vouziers
- Canton: Attigny
- Intercommunality: Argonne Ardennaise

Government
  - Mayor (2020–2026): Charles Van Den Bergh
- Area^{1}: 2.1 km^{2} (0.81 sq mi)
- Elevation: 118 m (387 ft)
- Population (2023): 77
  - Density: 37/km^{2} (95/sq mi)
- Time zone: UTC+01:00 (CET)
  - Summer (DST): UTC+02:00 (CEST)
- INSEE/Postal code: 08464 /08250
- ^{1} French Land Register data, which excludes lakes, ponds, glaciers > 1 km^{2} (0.386 sq mi or 247 acres) and river estuaries.

Vaux-lès-Mouron (French pronunciation: [vo lɛ muʁɔ̃], literally Vaux near Mouron) is a commune in the Ardennes department in northern France.

== Population ==
Historical population
Year	Pop.	±% p.a.
1968	129	—
1975	116	−1.51%
1982	97	−2.52%
1990	76	−3.00%
1999	62	−2.24%
2007	80	+3.24%
2012	87	+1.69%
2017	81	−1.42%
2023	77	−0.84%
Source: INSEE

== See also ==
- Communes of the Ardennes department
