= Mars-sous-Bourcq =

- Commune
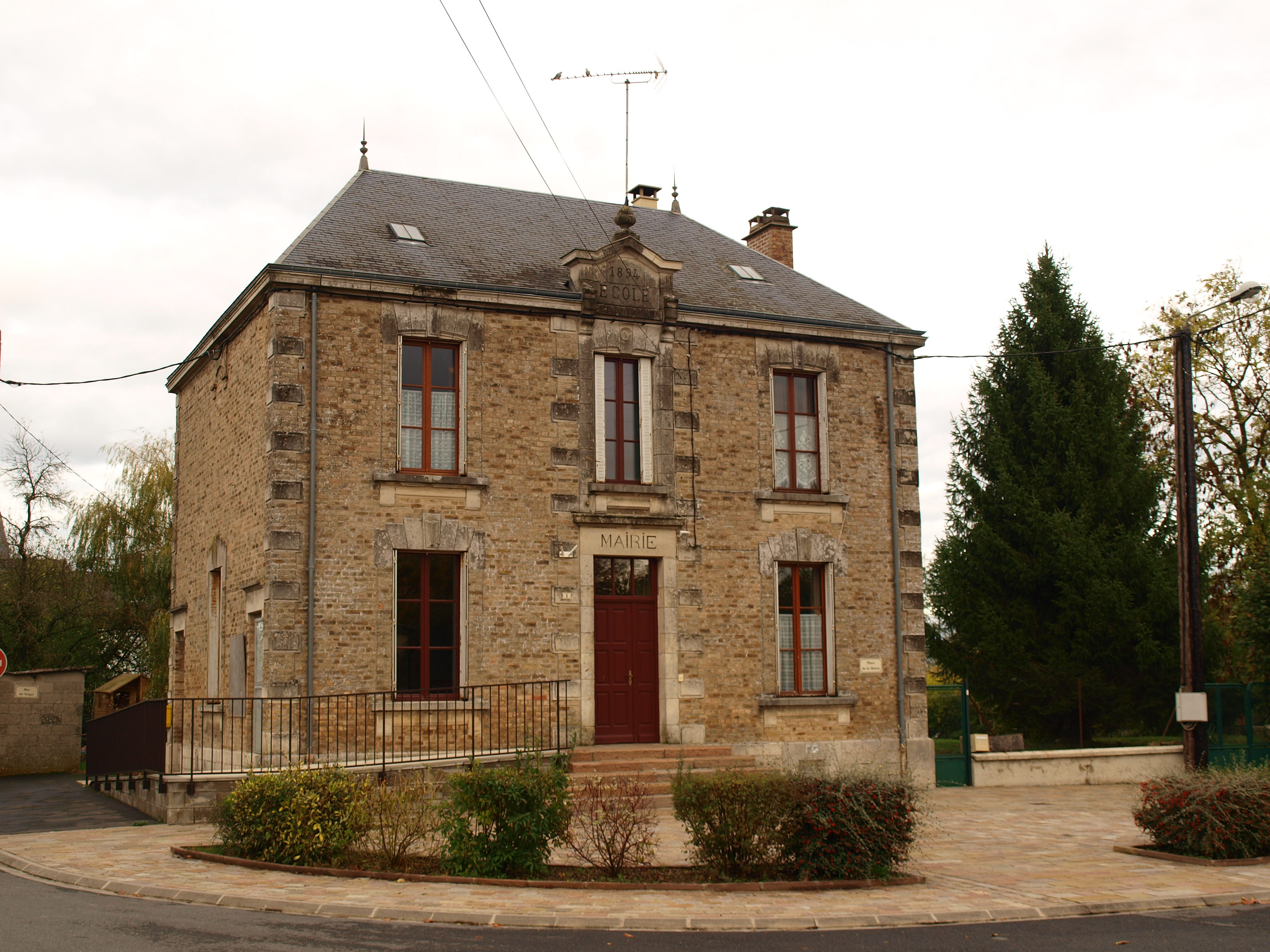
- The town hall in Mars-sous-Bourcq
- Location of Mars-sous-Bourcq
- Location within France Location within Grand Est
- Coordinates: 49°23′51″N 4°38′31″E
- Country: France
- Region: Grand Est
- Department: Ardennes
- Arrondissement: Vouziers
- Canton: Attigny
- Intercommunality: Argonne Ardennaise

Government
  - Mayor (2020–2026): Michaël Audegond
- Area^{1}: 4.73 km^{2} (1.83 sq mi)
- Elevation: 102 m (335 ft)
- Population (2023): 61
  - Density: 13/km^{2} (33/sq mi)
- Time zone: UTC+01:00 (CET)
  - Summer (DST): UTC+02:00 (CEST)
- INSEE/Postal code: 08279 /08400
- ^{1} French Land Register data, which excludes lakes, ponds, glaciers > 1 km^{2} (0.386 sq mi or 247 acres) and river estuaries.

Mars-sous-Bourcq (French pronunciation: [maʁs su buʁk]) is a commune in the Ardennes department and Grand Est region of north-eastern France.

== Population ==
Historical population
Year	Pop.	±% p.a.
1968	62	—
1975	57	−1.19%
1982	55	−0.51%
1990	46	−2.21%
1999	54	+1.80%
2007	46	−1.98%
2012	56	+4.01%
2017	55	−0.36%
2023	61	+1.74%
Source: INSEE

== See also ==
- Communes of the Ardennes department
