= Sainte-Marie, Ardennes =

Sainte-Marie
- Commune
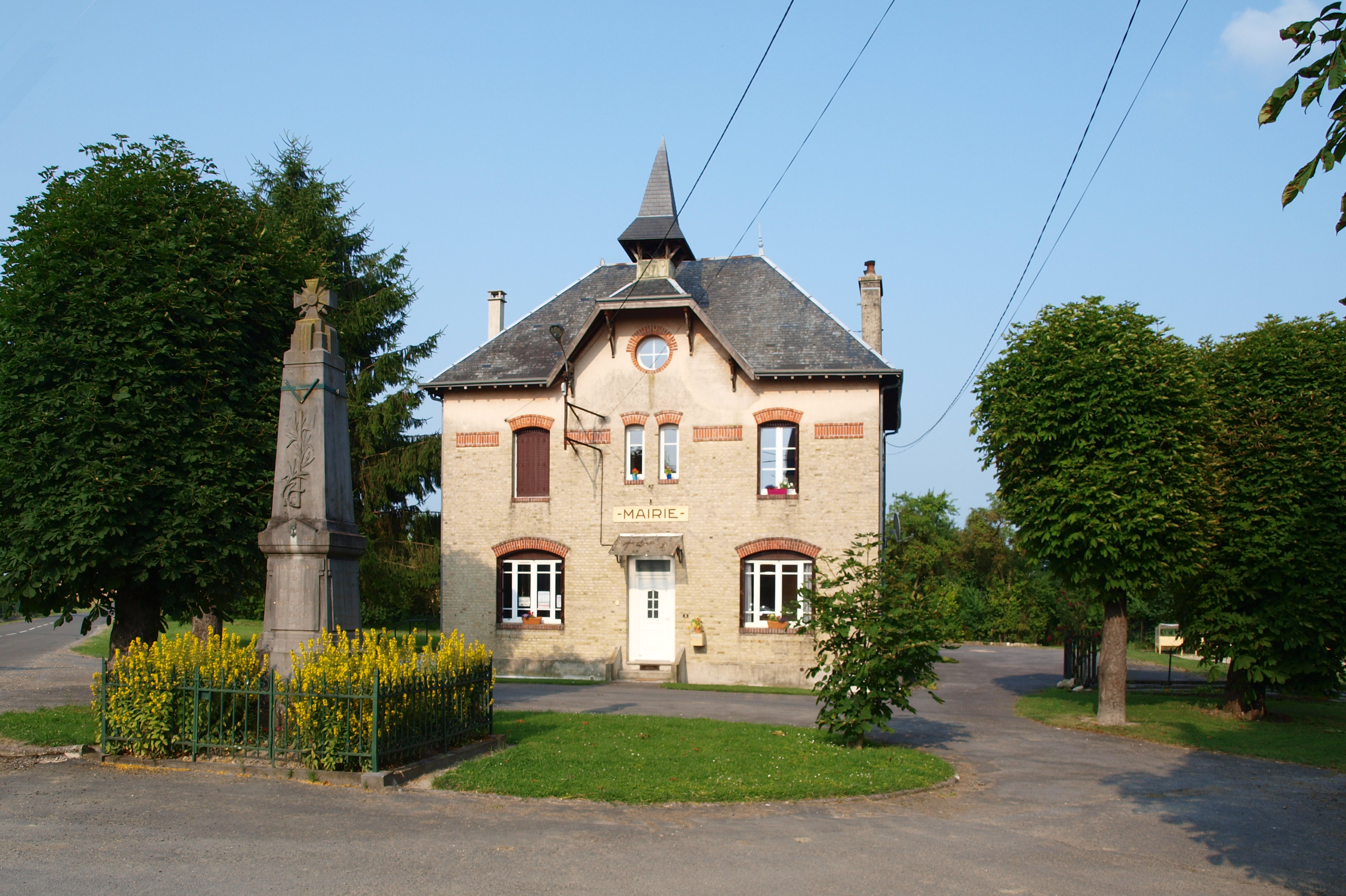
- The town hall in Sainte-Marie
- Location of Sainte-Marie
- Location within France Location within Grand Est
- Coordinates: 49°22′22″N 4°40′06″E
- Country: France
- Region: Grand Est
- Department: Ardennes
- Arrondissement: Vouziers
- Canton: Attigny
- Intercommunality: Argonne Ardennaise

Government
  - Mayor (2020–2026): Jean-François Le Gall
- Area^{1}: 5.57 km^{2} (2.15 sq mi)
- Elevation: 125 m (410 ft)
- Population (2023): 75
  - Density: 13/km^{2} (35/sq mi)
- Time zone: UTC+01:00 (CET)
  - Summer (DST): UTC+02:00 (CEST)
- INSEE/Postal code: 08390 /08400
- ^{1} French Land Register data, which excludes lakes, ponds, glaciers > 1 km^{2} (0.386 sq mi or 247 acres) and river estuaries.

Sainte-Marie (French pronunciation: [sɛ̃t maʁi]) is a commune in the Ardennes department in northern France.

== Population ==
Historical population
Year	Pop.	±% p.a.
1968	116	—
1975	86	−4.18%
1982	86	+0.00%
1990	69	−2.72%
1999	67	−0.33%
2007	74	+1.25%
2012	88	+3.53%
2017	80	−1.89%
2023	75	−1.07%
Source: INSEE

== See also ==
- Communes of the Ardennes department
