= Givry, Ardennes =

Givry
- Commune
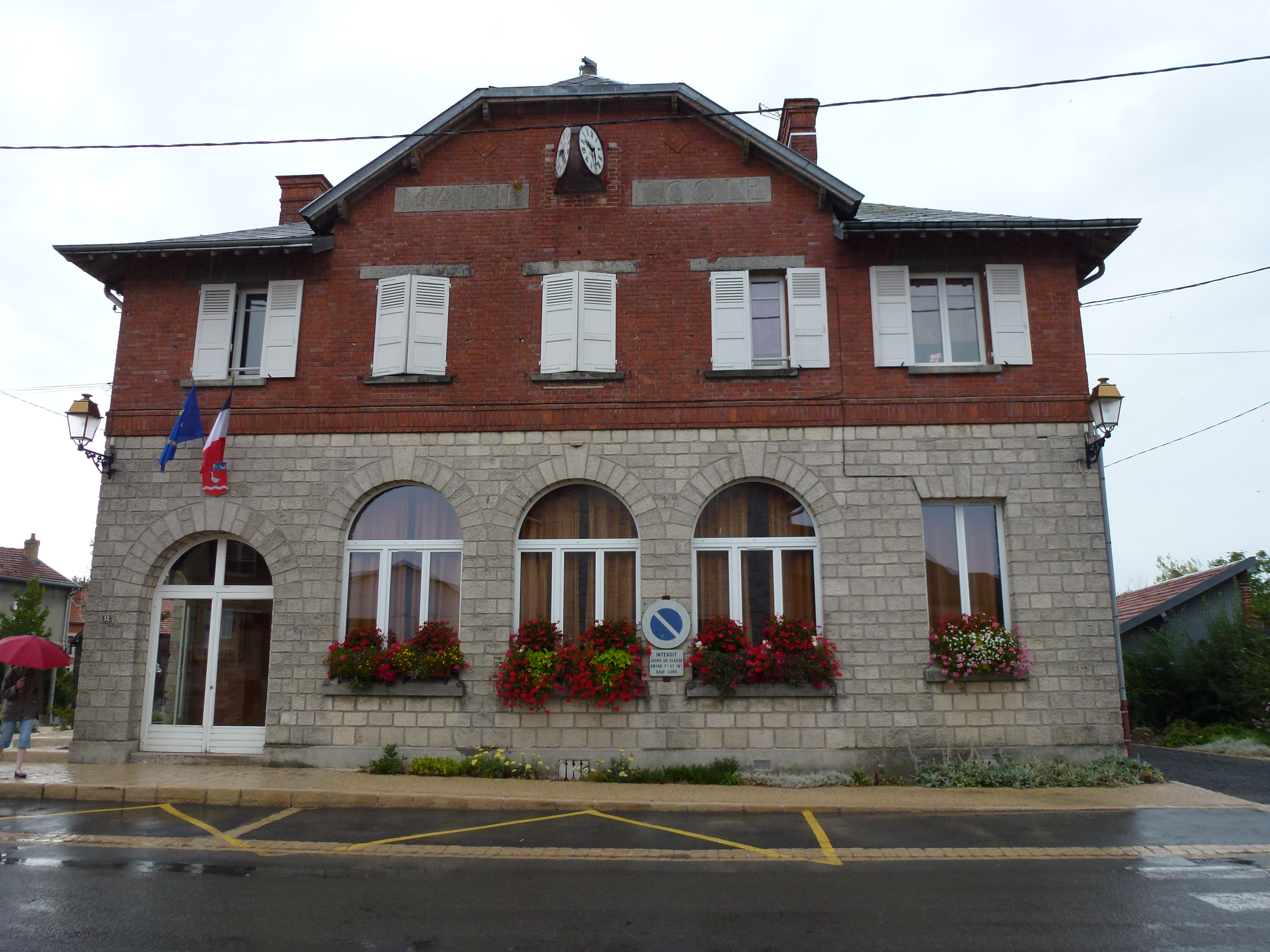
- The town hall in Givry

- Coat of arms
- Location of Givry
- Location within France Location within Grand Est
- Coordinates: 49°29′27″N 4°32′11″E
- Country: France
- Region: Grand Est
- Department: Ardennes
- Arrondissement: Vouziers
- Canton: Attigny
- Intercommunality: Crêtes Préardennaises

Government
  - Mayor (2020–2026): Xavier Fontaine
- Area^{1}: 11.93 km^{2} (4.61 sq mi)
- Elevation: 80 m (260 ft)
- Highest elevation: 107 m (351 ft)
- Lowest elevation: 77 m (253 ft)
- Population (2023): 266
  - Density: 22.3/km^{2} (57.7/sq mi)
- Time zone: UTC+01:00 (CET)
  - Summer (DST): UTC+02:00 (CEST)
- INSEE/Postal code: 08193 /08130
- ^{1} French Land Register data, which excludes lakes, ponds, glaciers > 1 km^{2} (0.386 sq mi or 247 acres) and river estuaries.

Givry (French pronunciation: [ʒivʁi]) is a commune in the Ardennes department in northern France.

== Population ==
Historical population
| Year | Pop. | ±% p.a. |
|---|---|---|
| 1968 | 245 | — |
| 1975 | 201 | −2.79% |
| 1982 | 199 | −0.14% |
| 1990 | 215 | +0.97% |
| 1999 | 218 | +0.15% |
| 2007 | 235 | +0.94% |
| 2012 | 261 | +2.12% |
| 2017 | 272 | +0.83% |
| 2023 | 266 | −0.37% |
Source: INSEE

== See also ==
- Communes of the Ardennes department
