= Briquenay =

- Commune
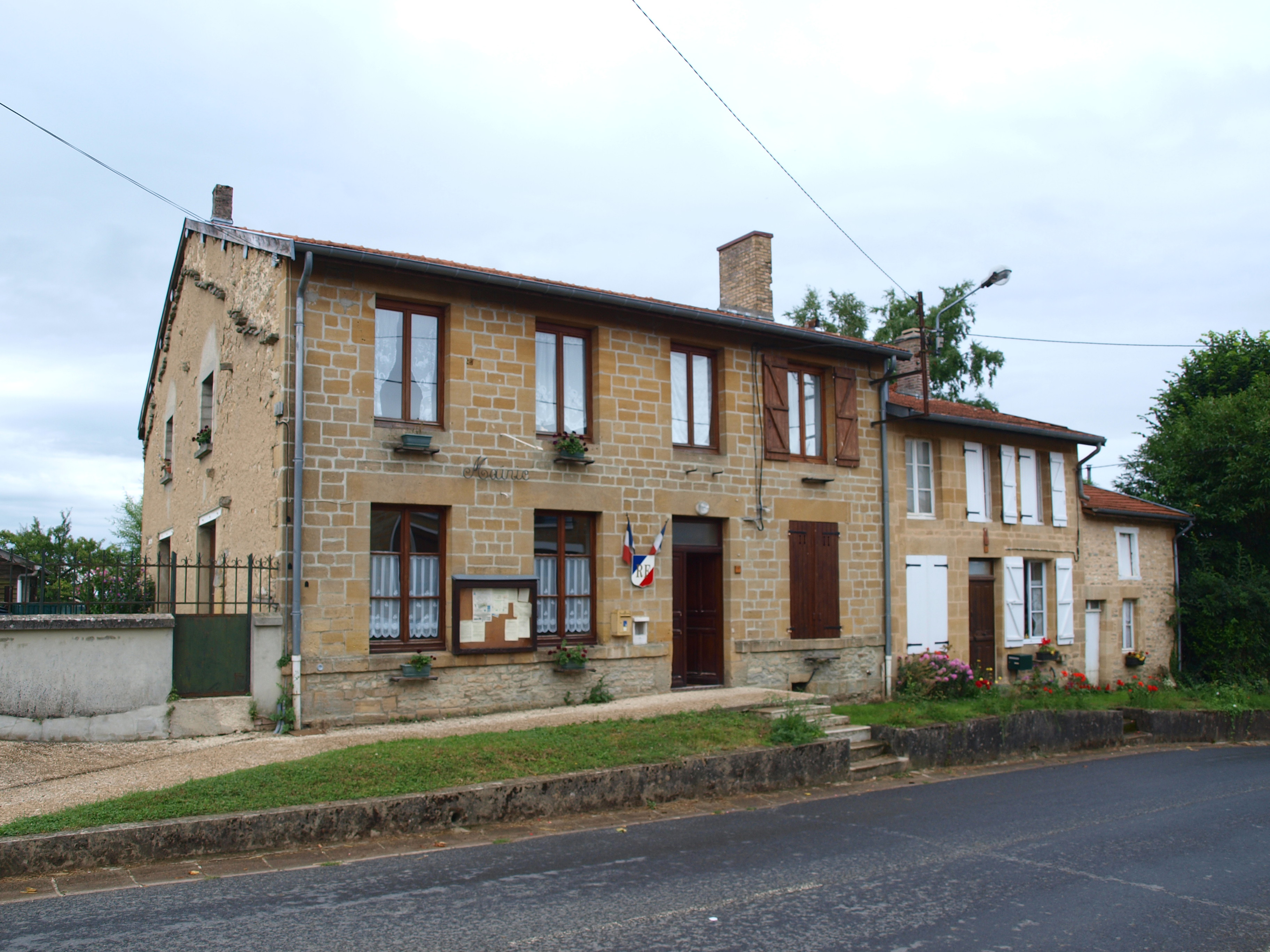
- The town hall in Briquenay
- Location of Briquenay
- Location within France Location within Grand Est
- Coordinates: 49°24′23″N 4°52′46″E
- Country: France
- Region: Grand Est
- Department: Ardennes
- Arrondissement: Vouziers
- Canton: Vouziers
- Intercommunality: Argonne Ardennaise

Government
  - Mayor (2021–2026): Jean-Michel Chance
- Area^{1}: 14.5 km^{2} (5.6 sq mi)
- Elevation: 170 m (560 ft)
- Highest elevation: 258 m (846 ft)
- Lowest elevation: 158 m (518 ft)
- Population (2023): 89
  - Density: 6.1/km^{2} (16/sq mi)
- Time zone: UTC+01:00 (CET)
  - Summer (DST): UTC+02:00 (CEST)
- INSEE/Postal code: 08086 /08240
- ^{1} French Land Register data, which excludes lakes, ponds, glaciers > 1 km^{2} (0.386 sq mi or 247 acres) and river estuaries.

Briquenay (French pronunciation: [bʁiknɛ]) is a commune in the Ardennes department in northern France.

== Population ==
Historical population
Year	Pop.	±% p.a.
1968	130	—
1975	103	−3.27%
1982	94	−1.30%
1990	98	+0.52%
1999	113	+1.60%
2007	127	+1.47%
2012	120	−1.13%
2017	98	−3.97%
2023	89	−1.59%
Source: INSEE

== See also ==
- Communes of the Ardennes department
