= Neuville-Day =

- Commune
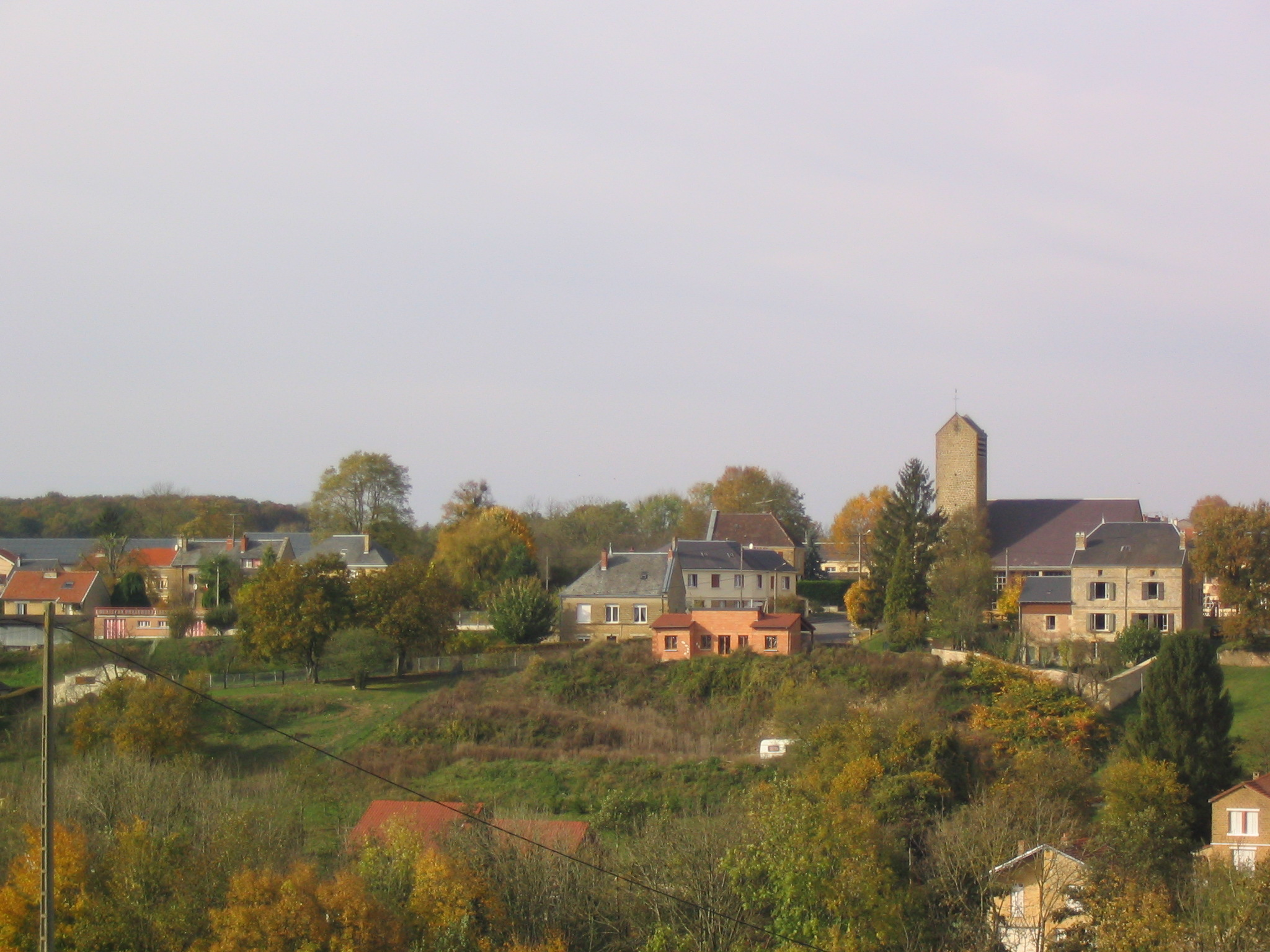
- A general view of Neuville
- Location of Neuville-Day
- Location within France Location within Grand Est
- Coordinates: 49°29′46″N 4°41′21″E
- Country: France
- Region: Grand Est
- Department: Ardennes
- Arrondissement: Vouziers
- Canton: Attigny
- Intercommunality: Crêtes Préardennaises

Government
  - Mayor (2020–2026): Bernard Mairien
- Area^{1}: 7.68 km^{2} (2.97 sq mi)
- Elevation: 160 m (520 ft)
- Population (2023): 168
  - Density: 21.9/km^{2} (56.7/sq mi)
- Time zone: UTC+01:00 (CET)
  - Summer (DST): UTC+02:00 (CEST)
- INSEE/Postal code: 08321 /08130
- ^{1} French Land Register data, which excludes lakes, ponds, glaciers > 1 km^{2} (0.386 sq mi or 247 acres) and river estuaries.

Neuville-Day (French pronunciation: [nøvil dɛ]) is a commune in the Ardennes department in northern France.

== Population ==
Historical population
Year	Pop.	±% p.a.
1968	220	—
1975	193	−1.85%
1982	185	−0.60%
1990	162	−1.65%
1999	154	−0.56%
2007	159	+0.40%
2012	172	+1.58%
2017	158	−1.68%
2023	168	+1.03%
Source: INSEE

== See also ==
- Communes of the Ardennes department
