= Sugny =

- Commune
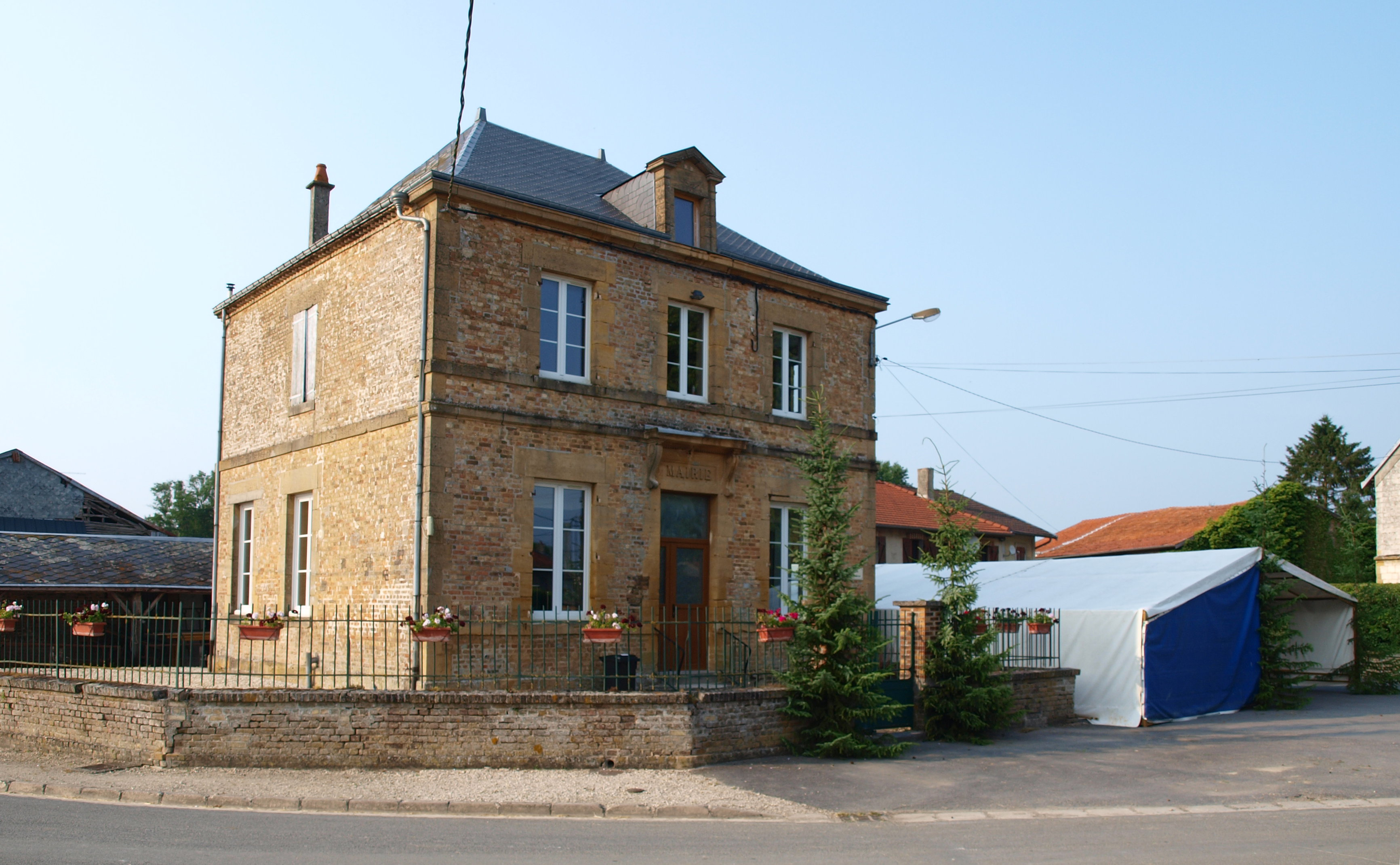
- The town hall in Sugny
- Location of Sugny
- Location within France Location within Grand Est
- Coordinates: 49°21′31″N 4°39′28″E
- Country: France
- Region: Grand Est
- Department: Ardennes
- Arrondissement: Vouziers
- Canton: Attigny
- Intercommunality: Argonne Ardennaise

Government
  - Mayor (2020–2026): Laurent Hannequin
- Area^{1}: 6.11 km^{2} (2.36 sq mi)
- Elevation: 120 m (390 ft)
- Population (2023): 92
  - Density: 15/km^{2} (39/sq mi)
- Time zone: UTC+01:00 (CET)
  - Summer (DST): UTC+02:00 (CEST)
- INSEE/Postal code: 08431 /08400
- ^{1} French Land Register data, which excludes lakes, ponds, glaciers > 1 km^{2} (0.386 sq mi or 247 acres) and river estuaries.

Sugny (French pronunciation: [syɲi]) is a commune in the Ardennes department in northern France.

== Population ==
Historical population
| Year | Pop. | ±% p.a. |
|---|---|---|
| 1968 | 102 | — |
| 1975 | 96 | −0.86% |
| 1982 | 84 | −1.89% |
| 1990 | 79 | −0.76% |
| 1999 | 88 | +1.21% |
| 2007 | 87 | −0.14% |
| 2012 | 110 | +4.80% |
| 2017 | 100 | −1.89% |
| 2023 | 92 | −1.38% |
Source: INSEE

== See also ==
- Communes of the Ardennes department
