= Saulces-Champenoises =

- Commune
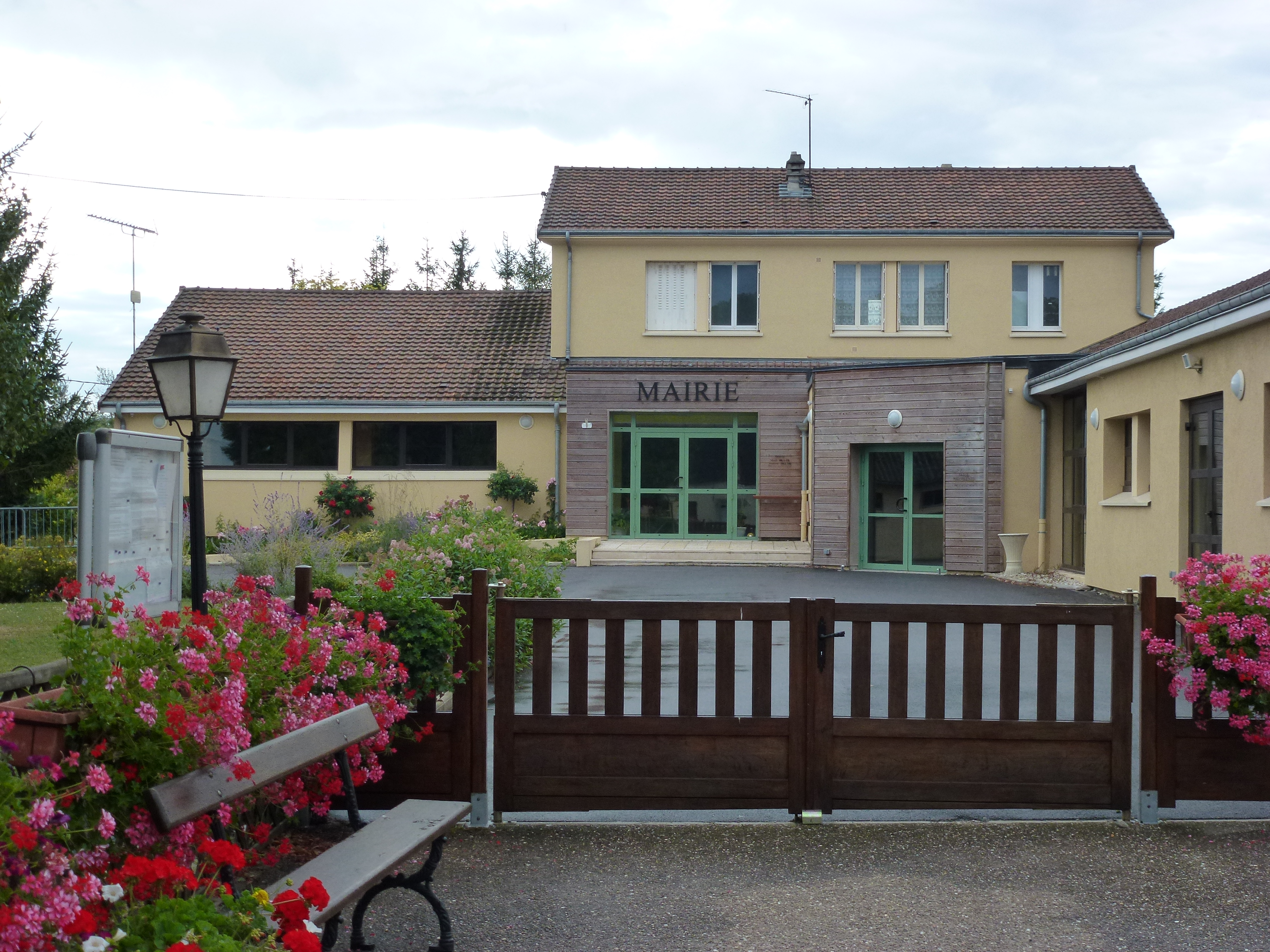
- The town hall in Saulces-Champenoises
- Location of Saulces-Champenoises
- Location within France Location within Grand Est
- Coordinates: 49°27′02″N 4°30′21″E
- Country: France
- Region: Grand Est
- Department: Ardennes
- Arrondissement: Vouziers
- Canton: Attigny
- Intercommunality: Crêtes Préardennaises

Government
  - Mayor (2020–2026): Michaël Masset
- Area^{1}: 22.64 km^{2} (8.74 sq mi)
- Elevation: 100 m (330 ft)
- Highest elevation: 164 m (538 ft)
- Lowest elevation: 80 m (260 ft)
- Population (2023): 219
  - Density: 9.67/km^{2} (25.1/sq mi)
- Time zone: UTC+01:00 (CET)
  - Summer (DST): UTC+02:00 (CEST)
- INSEE/Postal code: 08401 /08130
- ^{1} French Land Register data, which excludes lakes, ponds, glaciers > 1 km^{2} (0.386 sq mi or 247 acres) and river estuaries.

Saulces-Champenoises (French pronunciation: [so(l)s ʃɑ̃pənwaz]) is a commune in the Ardennes department in northern France.

== Population ==
Historical population
Year	Pop.	±% p.a.
1968	255	—
1975	240	−0.86%
1982	238	−0.12%
1990	230	−0.43%
1999	196	−1.76%
2007	185	−0.72%
2012	211	+2.66%
2017	243	+2.86%
2023	219	−1.72%
Source: INSEE

== See also ==
- Communes of the Ardennes department
