= Senuc =

- Commune
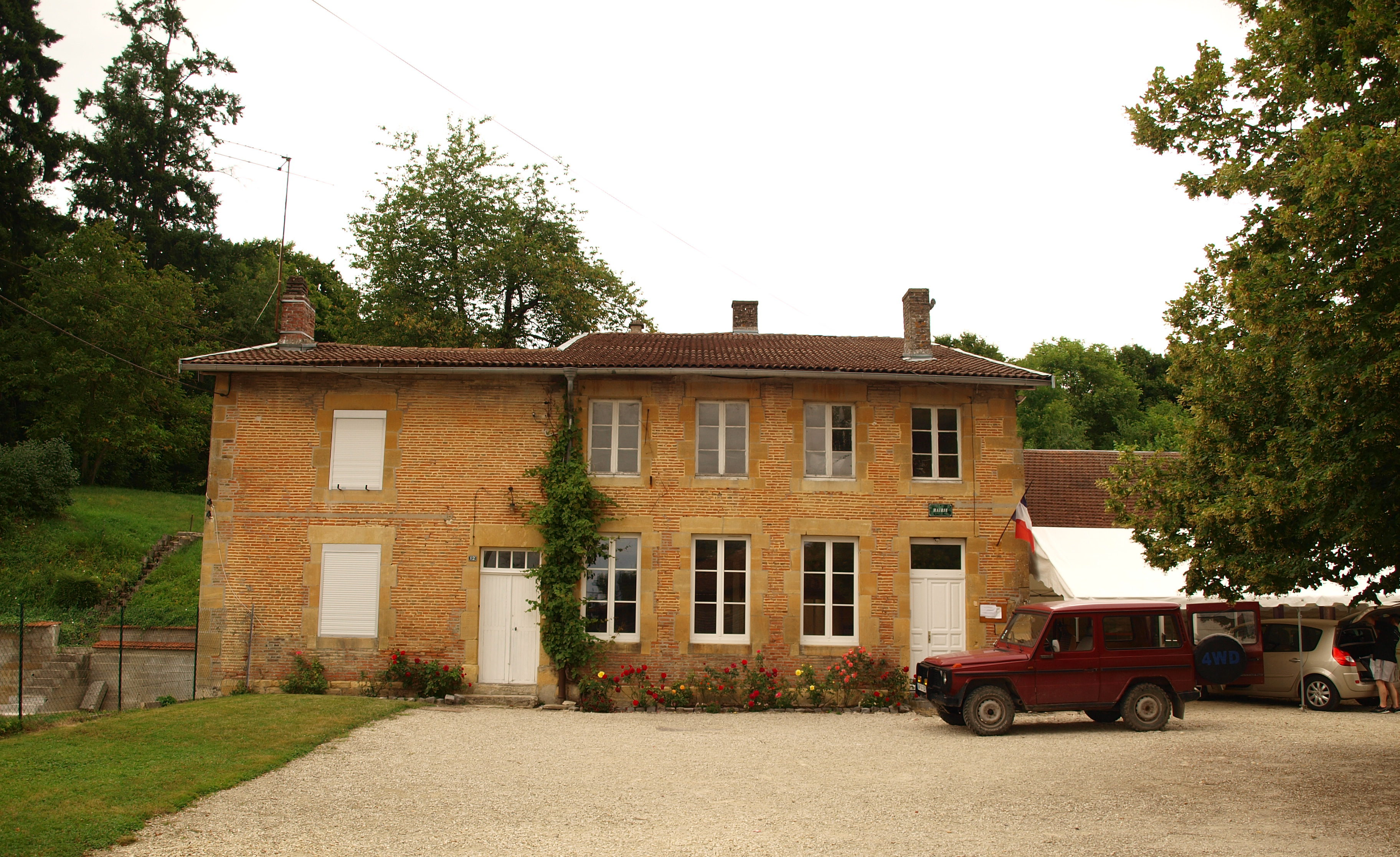
- The town hall in Senuc

- Coat of arms
- Location of Senuc
- Location within France Location within Grand Est
- Coordinates: 49°18′47″N 4°50′22″E
- Country: France
- Region: Grand Est
- Department: Ardennes
- Arrondissement: Vouziers
- Canton: Attigny
- Intercommunality: Argonne Ardennaise

Government
  - Mayor (2020–2026): Hervé Lahotte
- Area^{1}: 13.58 km^{2} (5.24 sq mi)
- Elevation: 135 m (443 ft)
- Highest elevation: 213 m (699 ft)
- Lowest elevation: 102 m (335 ft)
- Population (2023): 153
  - Density: 11.3/km^{2} (29.2/sq mi)
- Time zone: UTC+01:00 (CET)
  - Summer (DST): UTC+02:00 (CEST)
- INSEE/Postal code: 08412 /08250
- ^{1} French Land Register data, which excludes lakes, ponds, glaciers > 1 km^{2} (0.386 sq mi or 247 acres) and river estuaries.

Senuc (French pronunciation: [sənyk]) is a commune in the Ardennes department in northern France.

== Population ==
Historical population
Year	Pop.	±% p.a.
1968	219	—
1975	177	−3.00%
1982	168	−0.74%
1990	150	−1.41%
1999	142	−0.61%
2007	155	+1.10%
2012	147	−1.05%
2017	167	+2.58%
2023	153	−1.45%
Source: INSEE

== See also ==
- Communes of the Ardennes department
