= Pauvres =

- Commune
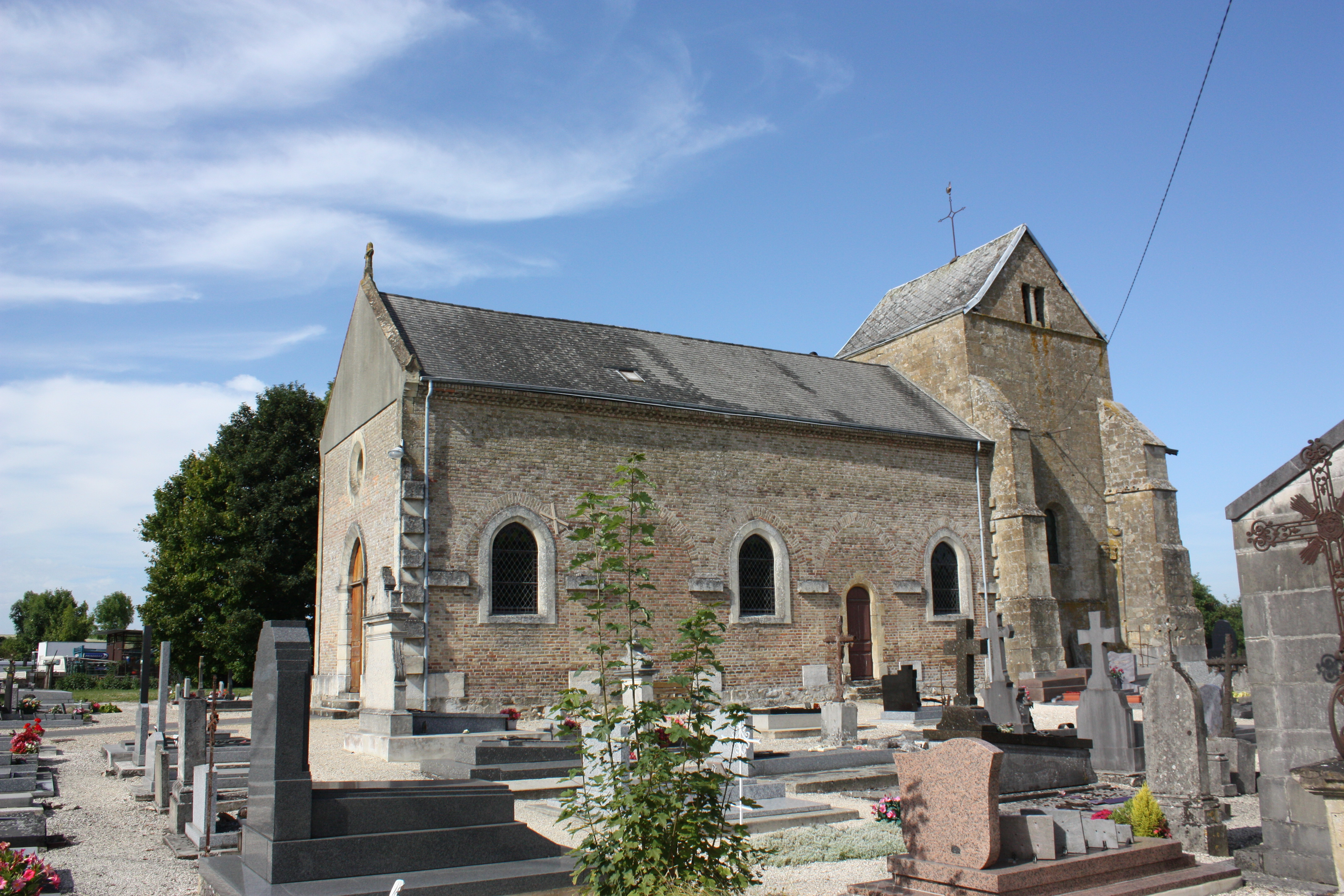
- The church in Pauvres

- Coat of arms
- Location of Pauvres
- Location within France Location within Grand Est
- Coordinates: 49°24′42″N 4°29′34″E
- Country: France
- Region: Grand Est
- Department: Ardennes
- Arrondissement: Vouziers
- Canton: Attigny
- Intercommunality: Argonne Ardennaise

Government
  - Mayor (2020–2026): André Malvaux
- Area^{1}: 12.64 km^{2} (4.88 sq mi)
- Elevation: 111 m (364 ft)
- Highest elevation: 163 m (535 ft)
- Lowest elevation: 99 m (325 ft)
- Population (2023): 194
  - Density: 15.3/km^{2} (39.8/sq mi)
- Time zone: UTC+01:00 (CET)
  - Summer (DST): UTC+02:00 (CEST)
- INSEE/Postal code: 08338 /08310
- ^{1} French Land Register data, which excludes lakes, ponds, glaciers > 1 km^{2} (0.386 sq mi or 247 acres) and river estuaries.

Pauvres (French pronunciation: [povʁ]) is a commune in the Ardennes department in northern France.

== Population ==
Historical population
Year	Pop.	±% p.a.
1968	212	—
1975	208	−0.27%
1982	201	−0.49%
1990	196	−0.31%
1999	187	−0.52%
2007	176	−0.75%
2012	186	+1.11%
2017	188	+0.21%
2023	194	+0.52%
Source: INSEE

== See also ==
- Communes of the Ardennes department
