= Savigny-sur-Aisne =

- Commune
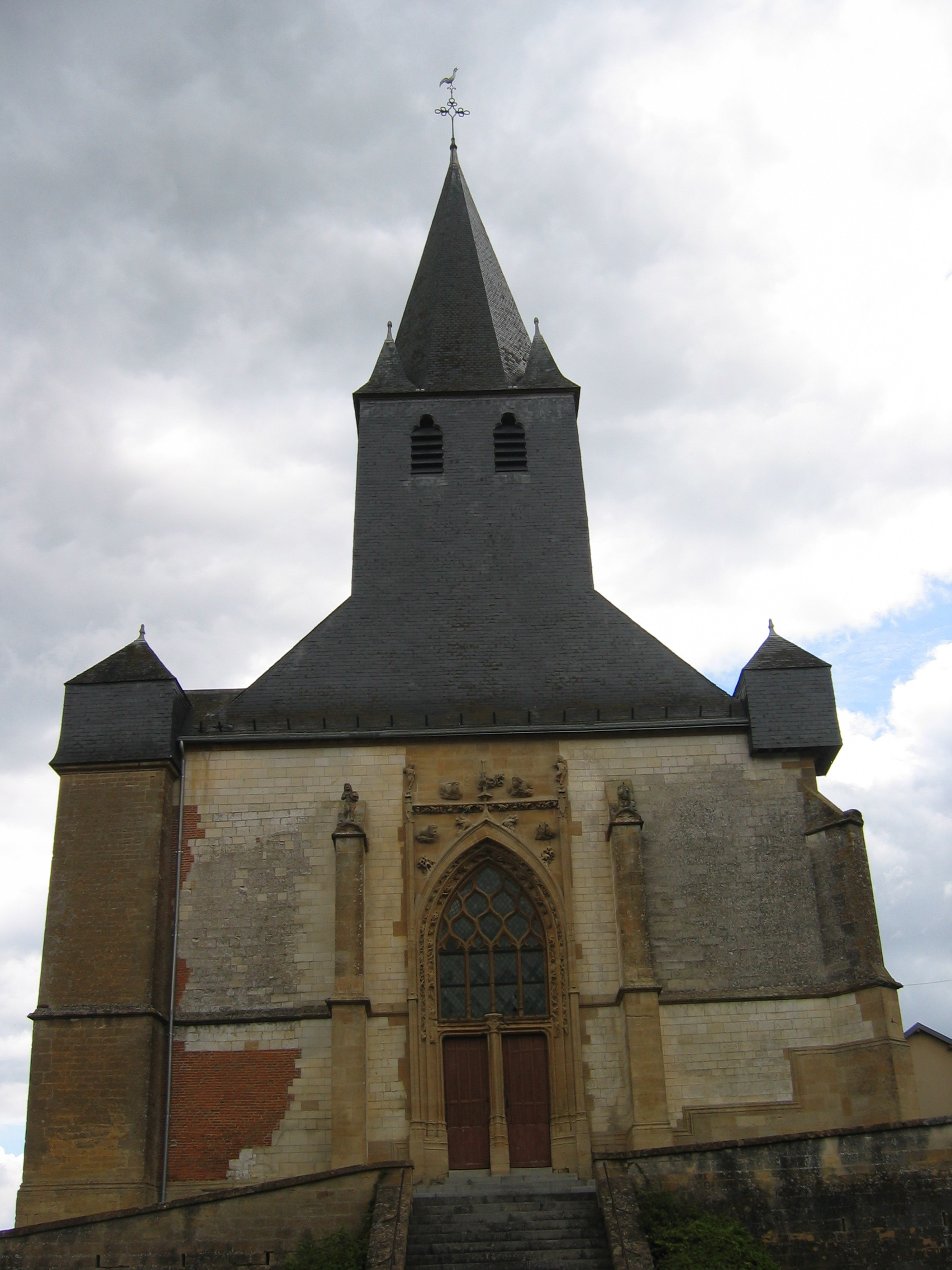
- The church in Savigny-sur-Aisne

- Coat of arms
- Location of Savigny-sur-Aisne
- Location within France Location within Grand Est
- Coordinates: 49°21′37″N 4°43′41″E
- Country: France
- Region: Grand Est
- Department: Ardennes
- Arrondissement: Vouziers
- Canton: Attigny
- Intercommunality: Argonne Ardennaise

Government
  - Mayor (2020–2026): Thierry Machinet
- Area^{1}: 10.41 km^{2} (4.02 sq mi)
- Elevation: 101 m (331 ft)
- Population (2023): 334
  - Density: 32.1/km^{2} (83.1/sq mi)
- Time zone: UTC+01:00 (CET)
  - Summer (DST): UTC+02:00 (CEST)
- INSEE/Postal code: 08406 /08400
- ^{1} French Land Register data, which excludes lakes, ponds, glaciers > 1 km^{2} (0.386 sq mi or 247 acres) and river estuaries.

Savigny-sur-Aisne (French pronunciation: [saviɲi syʁ ɛːn]; literally "Savigny on Aisne") is a commune in the Ardennes department in northern France.

== Population ==
Historical population
Year	Pop.	±% p.a.
1968	374	—
1975	366	−0.31%
1982	339	−1.09%
1990	376	+1.30%
1999	361	−0.45%
2007	370	+0.31%
2012	373	+0.16%
2017	375	+0.11%
2023	334	−1.91%
Source: INSEE

== See also ==
- Communes of the Ardennes department
