= Bouconville =

- Commune
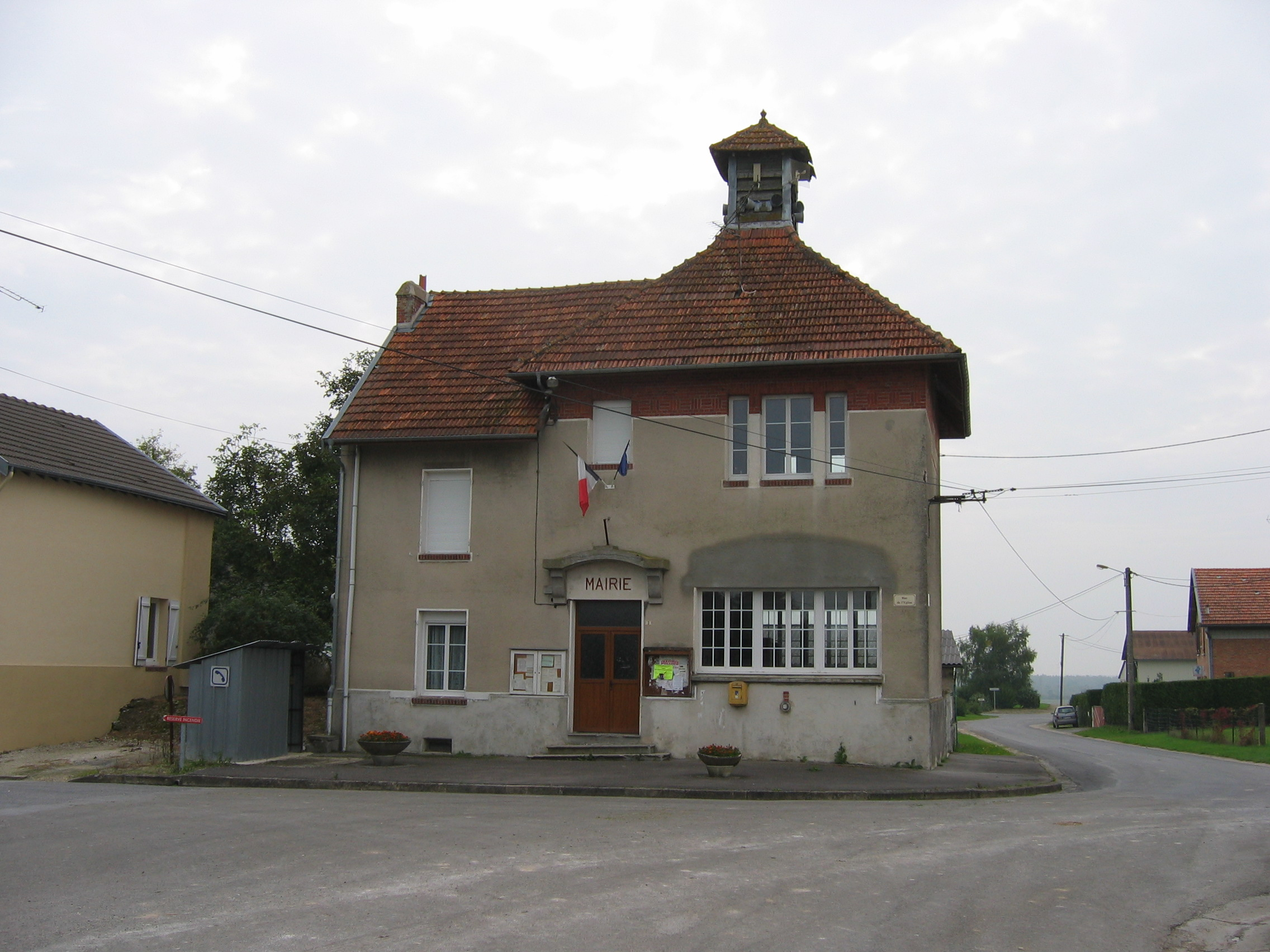
- The town hall in Bouconville

- Coat of arms
- Location of Bouconville
- Location within France Location within Grand Est
- Coordinates: 49°15′20″N 4°45′48″E
- Country: France
- Region: Grand Est
- Department: Ardennes
- Arrondissement: Vouziers
- Canton: Attigny
- Intercommunality: Argonne Ardennaise

Government
  - Mayor (2020–2026): Dominique Dumange
- Area^{1}: 15.21 km^{2} (5.87 sq mi)
- Elevation: 135 m (443 ft)
- Highest elevation: 182 m (597 ft)
- Lowest elevation: 106 m (348 ft)
- Population (2023): 58
  - Density: 3.8/km^{2} (9.9/sq mi)
- Time zone: UTC+01:00 (CET)
  - Summer (DST): UTC+02:00 (CEST)
- INSEE/Postal code: 08074 /08250
- ^{1} French Land Register data, which excludes lakes, ponds, glaciers > 1 km^{2} (0.386 sq mi or 247 acres) and river estuaries.

Bouconville (French pronunciation: [bukɔ̃vil]) is a commune in the Ardennes department in northern France.

== Population ==
Historical population
Year	Pop.	±% p.a.
1968	111	—
1975	84	−3.90%
1982	65	−3.60%
1990	55	−2.07%
1999	55	+0.00%
2007	49	−1.43%
2012	56	+2.71%
2017	53	−1.10%
2023	58	+1.51%
Source: INSEE

== See also ==
- Communes of the Ardennes department
