= Saint-Loup-Terrier =

- Commune
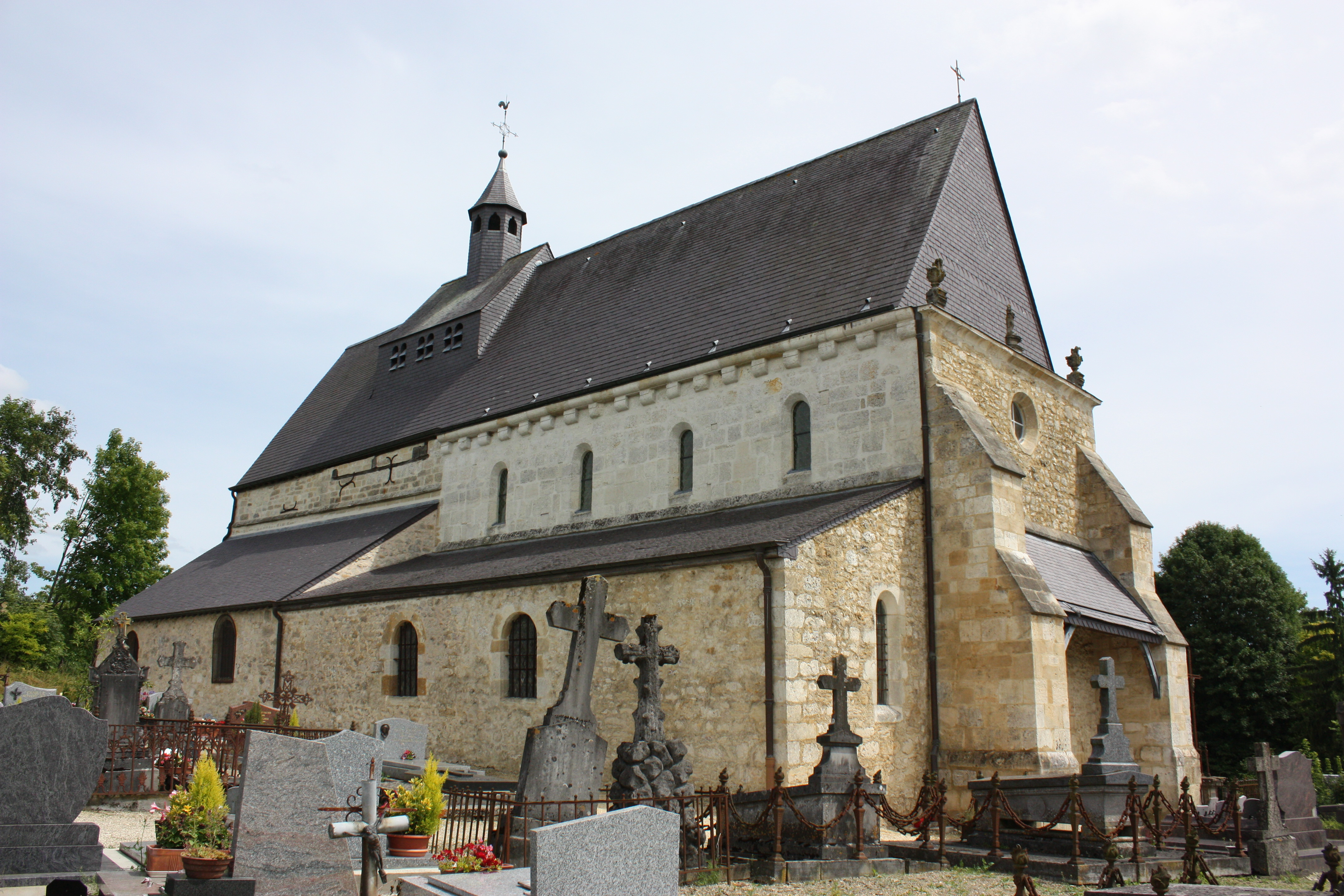
- The church in Saint-Loup-Terrier

- Coat of arms
- Location of Saint-Loup-Terrier
- Location within France Location within Grand Est
- Coordinates: 49°34′37″N 4°37′01″E
- Country: France
- Region: Grand Est
- Department: Ardennes
- Arrondissement: Vouziers
- Canton: Attigny
- Intercommunality: Crêtes Préardennaises

Government
  - Mayor (2020–2026): Christian Belloy
- Area^{1}: 15.3 km^{2} (5.9 sq mi)
- Elevation: 130 m (430 ft)
- Population (2023): 175
  - Density: 11.4/km^{2} (29.6/sq mi)
- Time zone: UTC+01:00 (CET)
  - Summer (DST): UTC+02:00 (CEST)
- INSEE/Postal code: 08387 /08130
- ^{1} French Land Register data, which excludes lakes, ponds, glaciers > 1 km^{2} (0.386 sq mi or 247 acres) and river estuaries.

Saint-Loup-Terrier (French pronunciation: [sɛ̃ lu tɛʁje]) is a commune in the Ardennes department in northern France.

== Population ==
Historical population
Year	Pop.	±% p.a.
1968	203	—
1975	166	−2.83%
1982	156	−0.88%
1990	167	+0.86%
1999	154	−0.90%
2007	161	+0.56%
2012	169	+0.97%
2017	179	+1.16%
2023	175	−0.38%
Source: INSEE

== See also ==
- Communes of the Ardennes department
