= Fléville =

- Commune
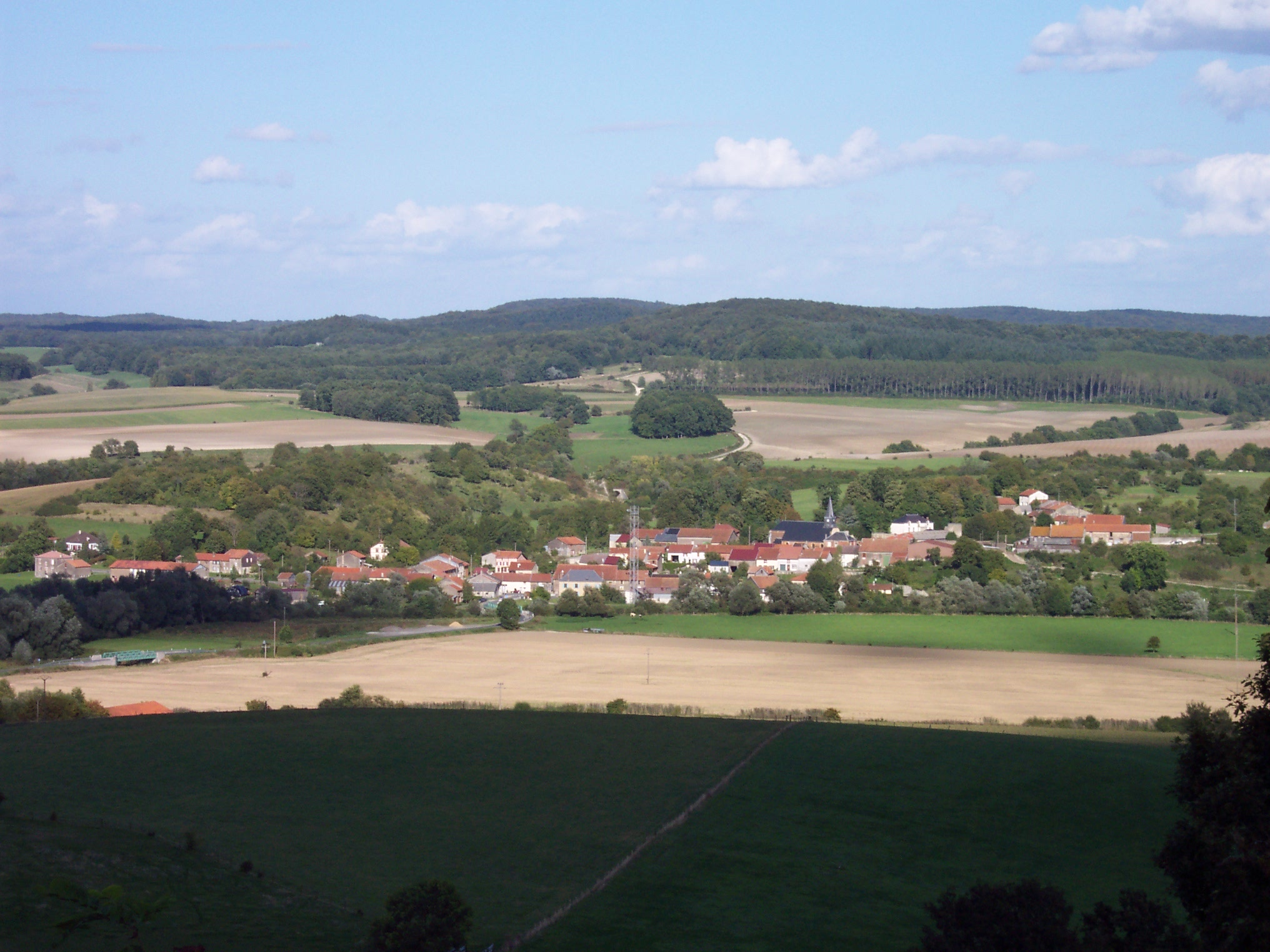
- A general view of Fléville

- Coat of arms
- Location of Fléville
- Location within France Location within Grand Est
- Coordinates: 49°18′23″N 4°58′20″E
- Country: France
- Region: Grand Est
- Department: Ardennes
- Arrondissement: Vouziers
- Canton: Attigny
- Intercommunality: Argonne Ardennaise

Government
  - Mayor (2020–2026): Alain Lobidel
- Area^{1}: 7.89 km^{2} (3.05 sq mi)
- Elevation: 132 m (433 ft)
- Highest elevation: 256 m (840 ft)
- Lowest elevation: 125 m (410 ft)
- Population (2023): 93
  - Density: 12/km^{2} (31/sq mi)
- Time zone: UTC+01:00 (CET)
  - Summer (DST): UTC+02:00 (CEST)
- INSEE/Postal code: 08171 /08250
- ^{1} French Land Register data, which excludes lakes, ponds, glaciers > 1 km^{2} (0.386 sq mi or 247 acres) and river estuaries.

Fléville (French pronunciation: [flevil]) is a commune in the Ardennes department in northern France.

== Population ==
Historical population
Year	Pop.	±% p.a.
1968	148	—
1975	118	−3.18%
1982	113	−0.62%
1990	108	−0.56%
1999	102	−0.63%
2007	96	−0.75%
2012	101	+1.02%
2017	97	−0.80%
2023	93	−0.70%
Source: INSEE

== See also ==
- Communes of the Ardennes department
