= Grivy-Loisy =

- Commune
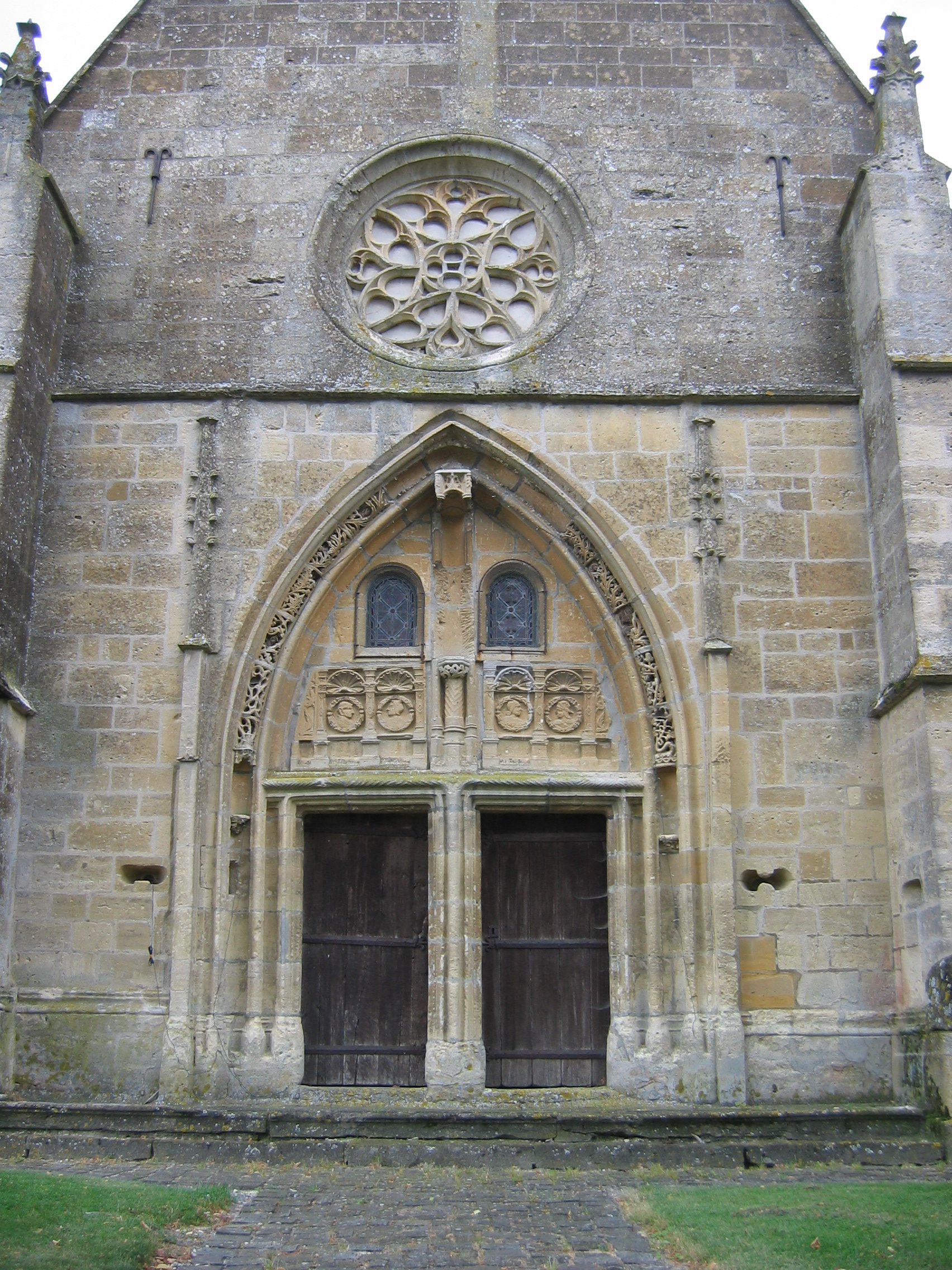
- The doors of the church in Grivy-Loisy
- Location of Grivy-Loisy
- Location within France Location within Grand Est
- Coordinates: 49°25′02″N 4°37′55″E
- Country: France
- Region: Grand Est
- Department: Ardennes
- Arrondissement: Vouziers
- Canton: Attigny
- Intercommunality: Argonne Ardennaise

Government
  - Mayor (2020–2026): Jean-Pol Richelet
- Area^{1}: 11.56 km^{2} (4.46 sq mi)
- Elevation: 118 m (387 ft)
- Highest elevation: 120 m (390 ft)
- Lowest elevation: 87 m (285 ft)
- Population (2023): 181
  - Density: 15.7/km^{2} (40.6/sq mi)
- Time zone: UTC+01:00 (CET)
  - Summer (DST): UTC+02:00 (CEST)
- INSEE/Postal code: 08200 /08400
- ^{1} French Land Register data, which excludes lakes, ponds, glaciers > 1 km^{2} (0.386 sq mi or 247 acres) and river estuaries.

Grivy-Loisy (French pronunciation: [gʁivi lwazi]) is a commune in the Ardennes department in northern France.

== Population ==
Historical population
Year	Pop.	±% p.a.
1968	219	—
1975	182	−2.61%
1982	182	+0.00%
1990	190	+0.54%
1999	191	+0.06%
2007	178	−0.88%
2012	182	+0.45%
2017	184	+0.22%
2023	181	−0.27%
Source: INSEE

== See also ==
- Communes of the Ardennes department
