= Lançon, Ardennes =

Lançon
- Commune
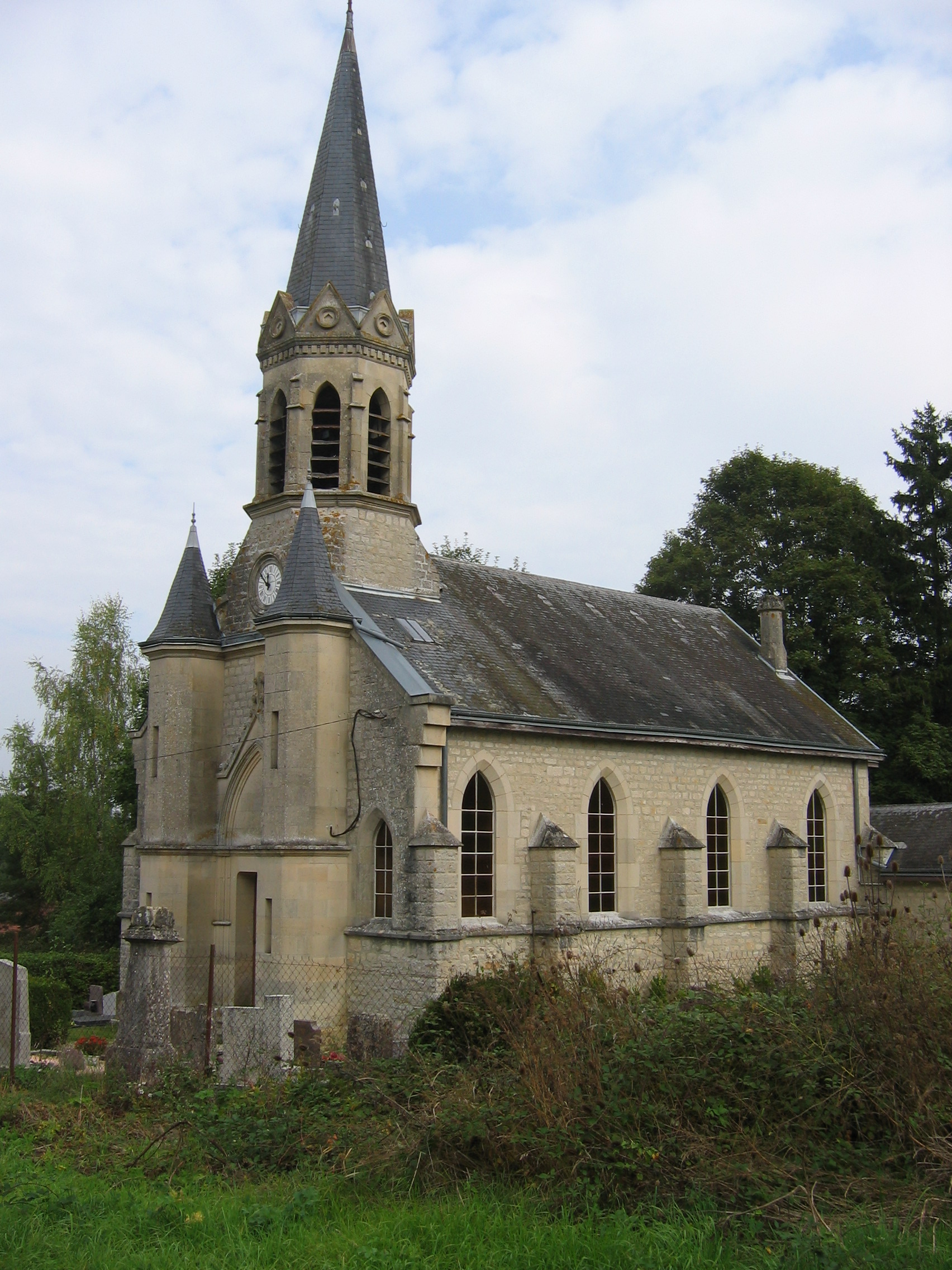
- The church in Lançon

- Coat of arms
- Location of Lançon
- Location within France Location within Grand Est
- Coordinates: 49°16′33″N 4°52′29″E
- Country: France
- Region: Grand Est
- Department: Ardennes
- Arrondissement: Vouziers
- Canton: Attigny
- Intercommunality: Argonne Ardennaise

Government
  - Mayor (2020–2026): Eric Haulin
- Area^{1}: 8.24 km^{2} (3.18 sq mi)
- Elevation: 115 m (377 ft)
- Highest elevation: 218 m (715 ft)
- Lowest elevation: 107 m (351 ft)
- Population (2023): 30
  - Density: 3.6/km^{2} (9.4/sq mi)
- Time zone: UTC+01:00 (CET)
  - Summer (DST): UTC+02:00 (CEST)
- INSEE/Postal code: 08245 /08250
- ^{1} French Land Register data, which excludes lakes, ponds, glaciers > 1 km^{2} (0.386 sq mi or 247 acres) and river estuaries.

Lançon (French pronunciation: [lɑ̃sɔ̃]) is a commune in the Ardennes department in northern France.

== Population ==
Historical population
Year	Pop.	±% p.a.
1968	43	—
1975	43	+0.00%
1982	34	−3.30%
1990	41	+2.37%
1999	40	−0.27%
2007	41	+0.31%
2012	37	−2.03%
2017	33	−2.26%
2023	30	−1.58%
Source: INSEE

== See also ==
- Communes of the Ardennes department
