= Arrondissement of Vouziers =

Coordinates: 49.40°N 4.70°E

Vouziers
- Arrondissement
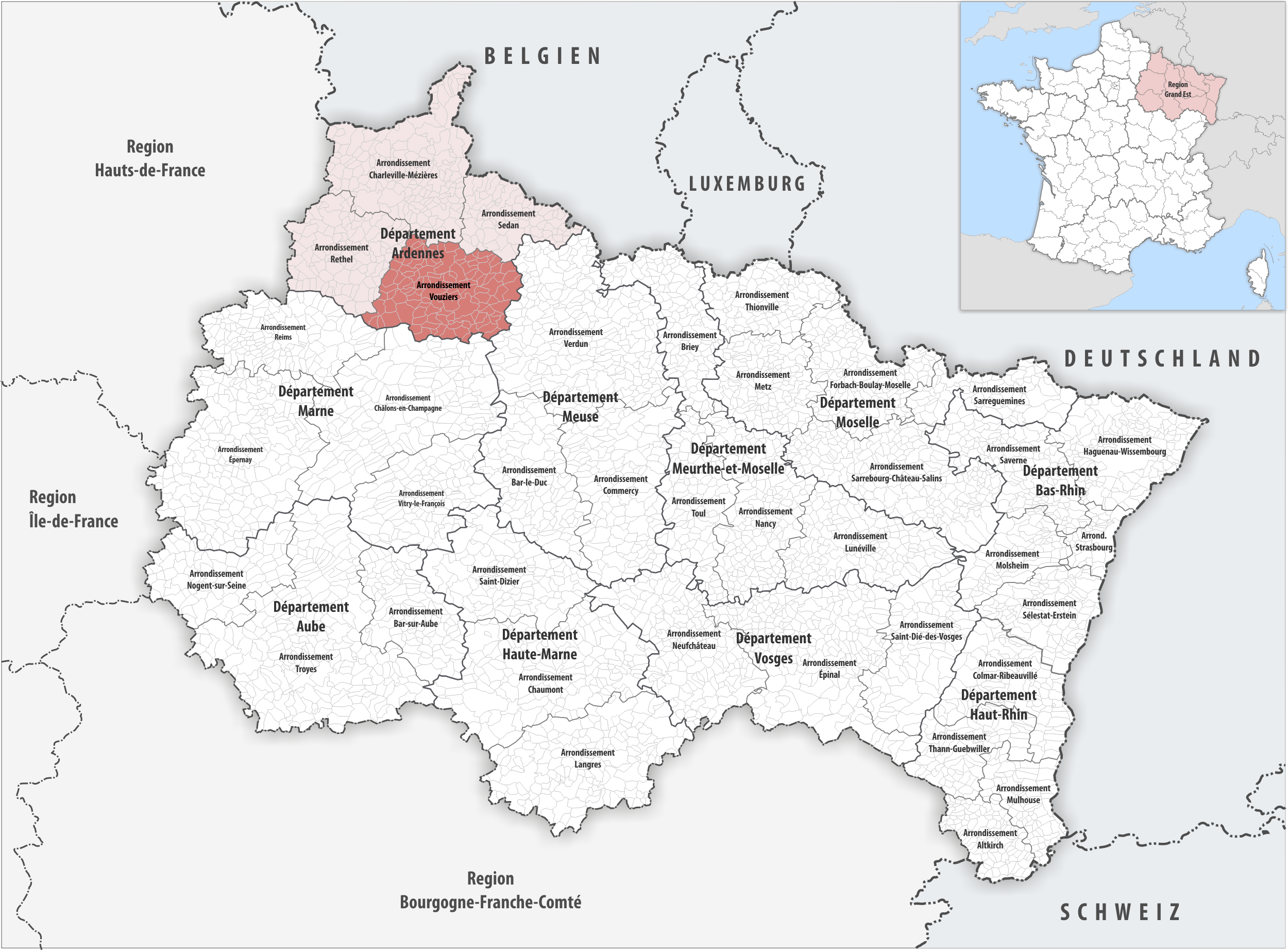
- Location within the region Grand Est
- Country: France
- Region: Grand Est
- Department: Ardennes
- No. of communes: {{{nbcomm}}}
- Area: 1,412.2 km^{2} (545.3 sq mi)
- Population (2023): 20,688
  - Density: 14.649/km^{2} (37.942/sq mi)
- INSEE code: 084

The arrondissement of Vouziers is an arrondissement of France in the Ardennes department in the Grand Est region. It has 118 communes. Its population is 21,052 (2021), and its area is 1,412.2 km^{2} (545.3 sq mi).

== Composition ==
The communes of the arrondissement of Vouziers, and their INSEE codes, are:

1. Alland'Huy-et-Sausseuil (08006)
2. Apremont (08017)
3. Ardeuil-et-Montfauxelles (08018)
4. Attigny (08025)
5. Aure (08031)
6. Authe (08033)
7. Autruche (08035)
8. Autry (08036)
9. Bairon-et-ses-Environs (08116)
10. Ballay (08045)
11. Bar-lès-Buzancy (08049)
12. Bayonville (08052)
13. Beffu-et-le-Morthomme (08056)
14. Belleville-et-Châtillon-sur-Bar (08057)
15. Belval-Bois-des-Dames (08059)
16. La Berlière (08061)
17. Bouconville (08074)
18. Boult-aux-Bois (08075)
19. Bourcq (08077)
20. Brécy-Brières (08082)
21. Brieulles-sur-Bar (08085)
22. Briquenay (08086)
23. Buzancy (08089)
24. Cauroy (08092)
25. Challerange (08097)
26. Champigneulle (08098)
27. Charbogne (08103)
28. Chardeny (08104)
29. Chatel-Chéhéry (08109)
30. Chevières (08120)
31. Chuffilly-Roche (08123)
32. Condé-lès-Autry (08128)
33. Contreuve (08130)
34. Cornay (08131)
35. Coulommes-et-Marqueny (08134)
36. La Croix-aux-Bois (08135)
37. Dricourt (08147)
38. Écordal (08151)
39. Exermont (08161)
40. Falaise (08164)
41. Fléville (08171)
42. Fossé (08176)
43. Germont (08186)
44. Givry (08193)
45. Les Grandes-Armoises (08019)
46. Grandham (08197)
47. Grandpré (08198)
48. Grivy-Loisy (08200)
49. Guincourt (08204)
50. Harricourt (08215)
51. Hauviné (08220)
52. Imécourt (08233)
53. Jonval (08238)
54. Lametz (08244)
55. Lançon (08245)
56. Landres-et-Saint-Georges (08246)
57. Leffincourt (08250)
58. Liry (08256)
59. Longwé (08259)
60. Machault (08264)
61. Manre (08271)
62. Marcq (08274)
63. Marquigny (08278)
64. Mars-sous-Bourcq (08279)
65. Marvaux-Vieux (08280)
66. Mont-Saint-Martin (08308)
67. Mont-Saint-Remy (08309)
68. Montcheutin (08296)
69. Montgon (08301)
70. Monthois (08303)
71. Mouron (08310)
72. Neuville-Day (08321)
73. Noirval (08325)
74. Nouart (08326)
75. Oches (08332)
76. Olizy-Primat (08333)
77. Pauvres (08338)
78. Les Petites-Armoises (08020)
79. Quatre-Champs (08350)
80. Quilly (08351)
81. Rilly-sur-Aisne (08364)
82. La Sabotterie (08374)
83. Saint-Clément-à-Arnes (08378)
84. Sainte-Marie (08390)
85. Saint-Étienne-à-Arnes (08379)
86. Saint-Juvin (08383)
87. Saint-Lambert-et-Mont-de-Jeux (08384)
88. Saint-Loup-Terrier (08387)
89. Saint-Morel (08392)
90. Saint-Pierre-à-Arnes (08393)
91. Saint-Pierremont (08394)
92. Sainte-Vaubourg (08398)
93. Saulces-Champenoises (08401)
94. Sauville (08405)
95. Savigny-sur-Aisne (08406)
96. Séchault (08407)
97. Semide (08410)
98. Semuy (08411)
99. Senuc (08412)
100. Sommauthe (08424)
101. Sommerance (08425)
102. Sugny (08431)
103. Suzanne (08433)
104. Sy (08434)
105. Tailly (08437)
106. Tannay-le-Mont-Dieu (08439)
107. Thénorgues (08446)
108. Toges (08453)
109. Tourcelles-Chaumont (08455)
110. Tourteron (08458)
111. Vandy (08461)
112. Vaux-Champagne (08462)
113. Vaux-en-Dieulet (08463)
114. Vaux-lès-Mouron (08464)
115. Verpel (08470)
116. Verrières (08471)
117. Voncq (08489)
118. Vouziers (08490)

== History ==
The arrondissement of Vouziers was created in 1800.

As a result of the reorganisation of the cantons of France which came into effect in 2015, the borders of the cantons are no longer related to the borders of the arrondissements. The cantons of the arrondissement of Vouziers were, as of January 2015:

1. Attigny
2. Buzancy
3. Le Chesne
4. Grandpré
5. Machault
6. Monthois
7. Tourteron
8. Vouziers

== Sub-prefects ==
- Louis Thibon : 21 October 1898
