= Sommerance =

- Commune
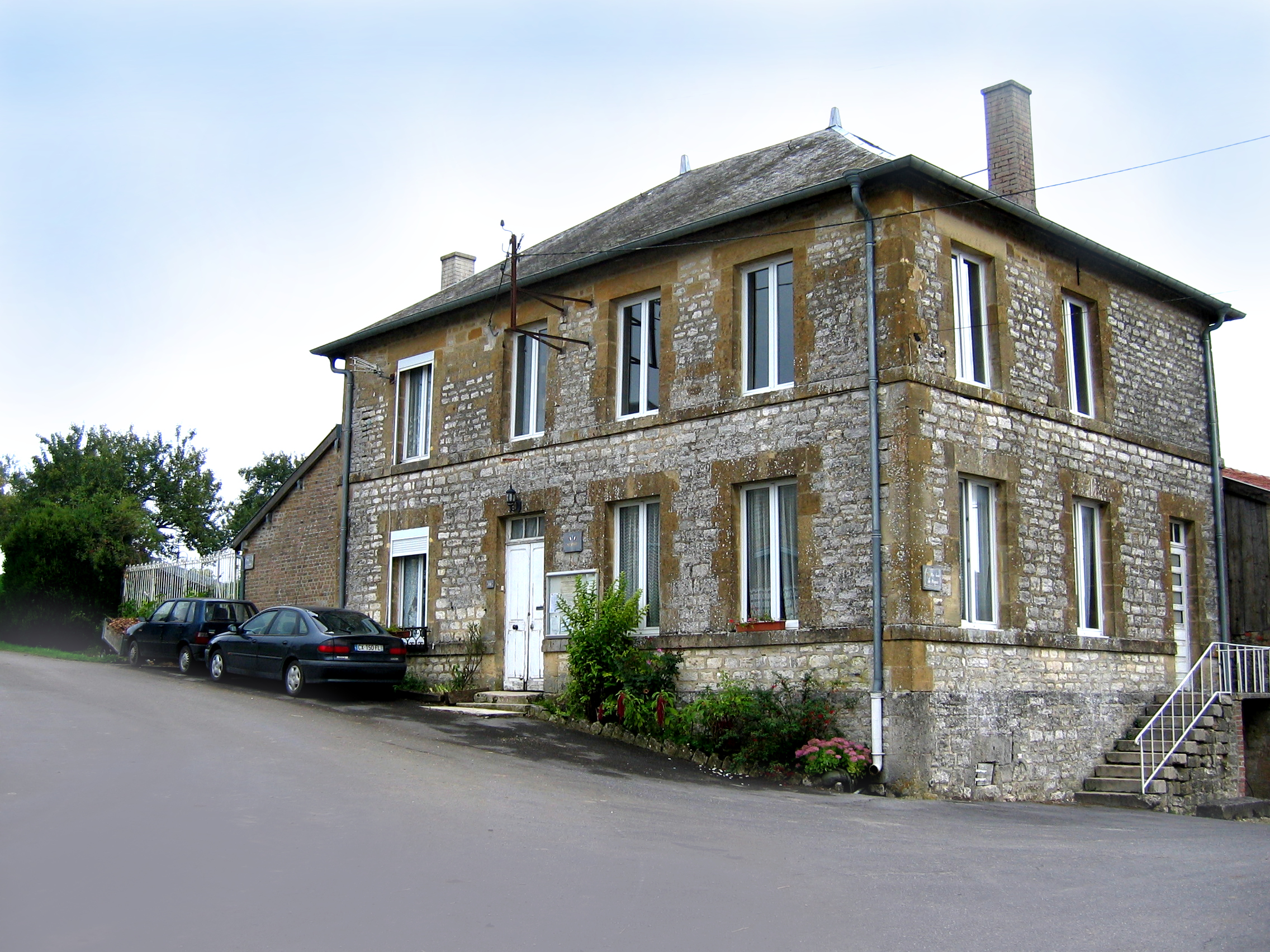
- The town hall in Sommerance

- Coat of arms
- Location of Sommerance
- Location within France Location within Grand Est
- Coordinates: 49°19′45″N 4°59′14″E
- Country: France
- Region: Grand Est
- Department: Ardennes
- Arrondissement: Vouziers
- Canton: Attigny
- Intercommunality: Argonne Ardennaise

Government
  - Mayor (2020–2026): Florent Pierson
- Area^{1}: 5.18 km^{2} (2.00 sq mi)
- Elevation: 195 m (640 ft)
- Highest elevation: 255 m (837 ft)
- Lowest elevation: 135 m (443 ft)
- Population (2023): 50
  - Density: 9.7/km^{2} (25/sq mi)
- Time zone: UTC+01:00 (CET)
  - Summer (DST): UTC+02:00 (CEST)
- INSEE/Postal code: 08425 /08250
- ^{1} French Land Register data, which excludes lakes, ponds, glaciers > 1 km^{2} (0.386 sq mi or 247 acres) and river estuaries.

Sommerance (French pronunciation: [sɔmʁɑ̃s]) is a commune in the Ardennes department in northern France.

== Population ==
Historical population
Year	Pop.	±% p.a.
1968	78	—
1975	56	−4.62%
1982	58	+0.50%
1990	65	+1.43%
1999	52	−2.45%
2007	47	−1.26%
2012	43	−1.76%
2017	37	−2.96%
2023	50	+5.15%
Source: INSEE

== See also ==
- Communes of the Ardennes department
