= Condé-lès-Autry =

- Commune
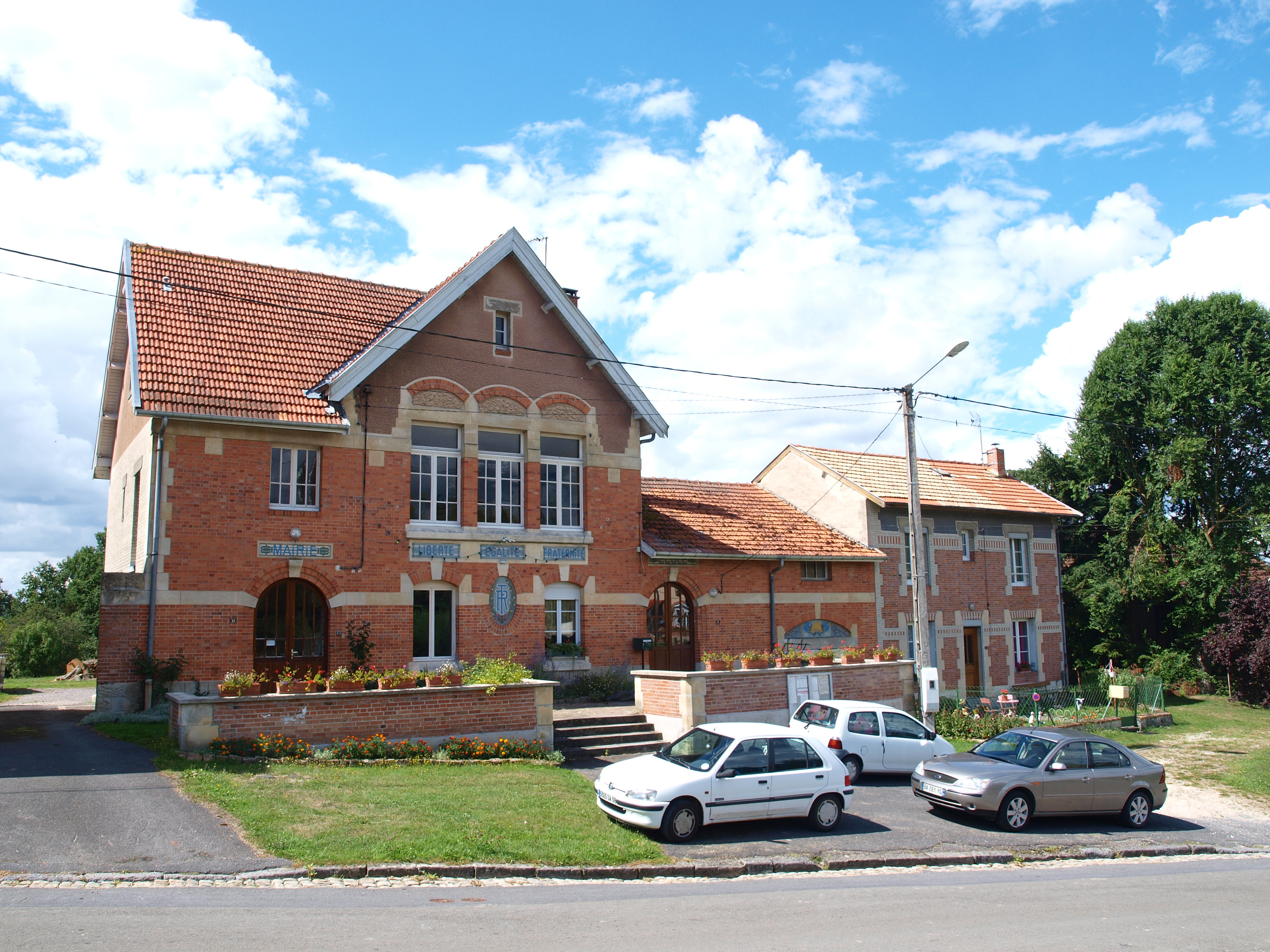
- The town hall in Condé-lès-Autry
- Location of Condé-lès-Autry
- Location within France Location within Grand Est
- Coordinates: 49°15′09″N 4°51′19″E
- Country: France
- Region: Grand Est
- Department: Ardennes
- Arrondissement: Vouziers
- Canton: Attigny
- Intercommunality: Argonne Ardennaise

Government
  - Mayor (2020–2026): Thierry Renaux
- Area^{1}: 7.97 km^{2} (3.08 sq mi)
- Elevation: 115 m (377 ft)
- Population (2023): 64
  - Density: 8.0/km^{2} (21/sq mi)
- Time zone: UTC+01:00 (CET)
  - Summer (DST): UTC+02:00 (CEST)
- INSEE/Postal code: 08128 /08250
- ^{1} French Land Register data, which excludes lakes, ponds, glaciers > 1 km^{2} (0.386 sq mi or 247 acres) and river estuaries.

Condé-lès-Autry (French pronunciation: [kɔ̃de lɛ.z‿otʁi], literally Condé near Autry) is a commune in the Ardennes department in northern France.

== Population ==
Historical population
Year	Pop.	±% p.a.
1968	106	—
1975	98	−1.11%
1982	72	−4.31%
1990	68	−0.71%
1999	84	+2.38%
2007	74	−1.57%
2012	78	+1.06%
2017	67	−2.99%
2023	64	−0.76%
Source: INSEE

== See also ==
- Communes of the Ardennes department
