= Montcheutin =

- Commune
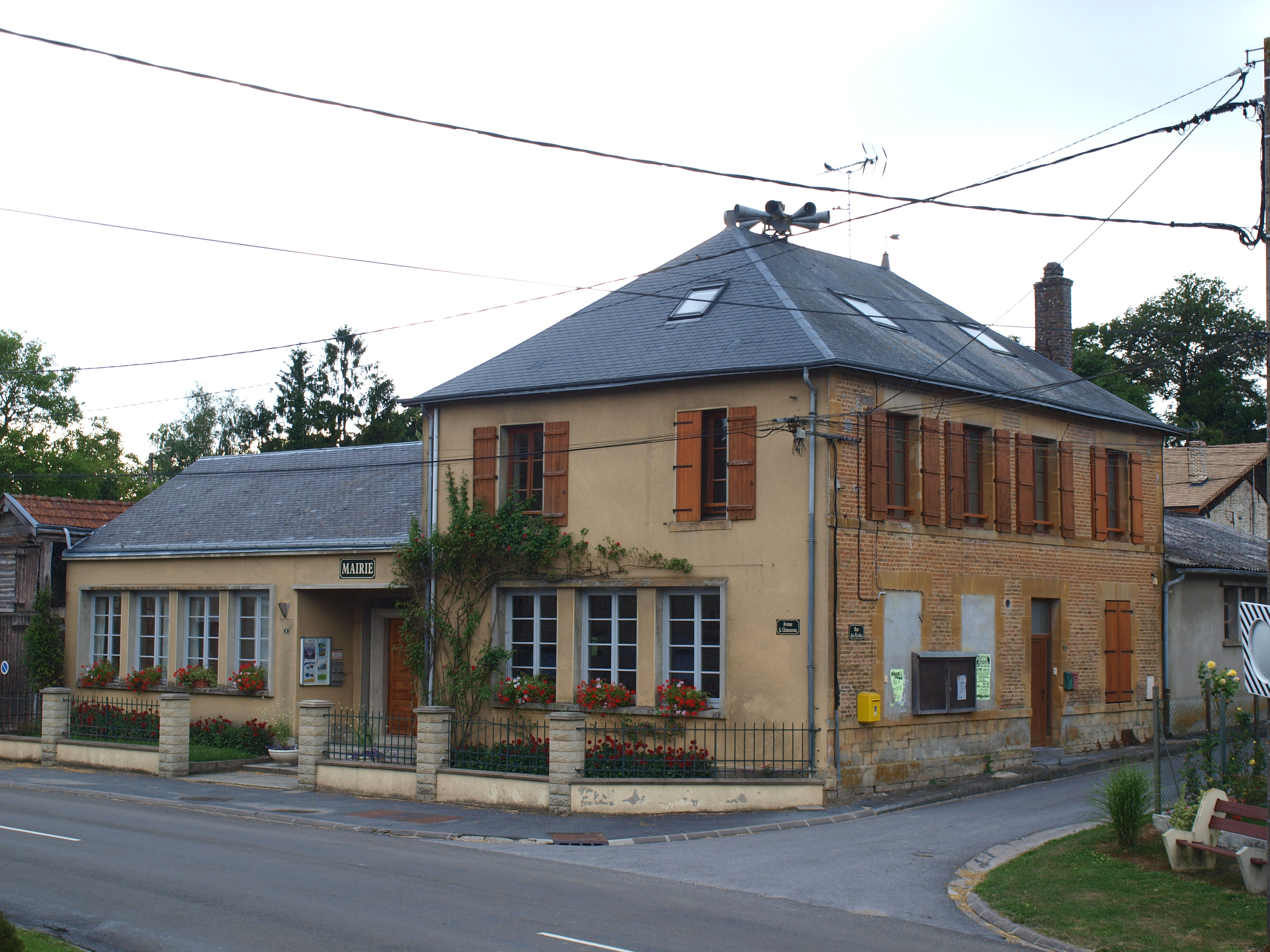
- The town hall in Montcheutin
- Location of Montcheutin
- Location within France Location within Grand Est
- Coordinates: 49°17′31″N 4°49′17″E
- Country: France
- Region: Grand Est
- Department: Ardennes
- Arrondissement: Vouziers
- Canton: Attigny
- Intercommunality: Argonne Ardennaise

Government
  - Mayor (2020–2026): René Francart
- Area^{1}: 9.64 km^{2} (3.72 sq mi)
- Elevation: 106 m (348 ft)
- Population (2023): 110
  - Density: 11/km^{2} (30/sq mi)
- Time zone: UTC+01:00 (CET)
  - Summer (DST): UTC+02:00 (CEST)
- INSEE/Postal code: 08296 /08250
- ^{1} French Land Register data, which excludes lakes, ponds, glaciers > 1 km^{2} (0.386 sq mi or 247 acres) and river estuaries.

Montcheutin (French pronunciation: [mɔ̃ʃøtɛ̃]) is a commune in the Ardennes department in northern France.

== Population ==
Historical population
Year	Pop.	±% p.a.
1968	166	—
1975	159	−0.61%
1982	136	−2.21%
1990	113	−2.29%
1999	118	+0.48%
2007	140	+2.16%
2012	147	+0.98%
2017	128	−2.73%
2023	110	−2.49%
Source: INSEE

== See also ==
- Communes of the Ardennes department
