= Challerange =

- Commune
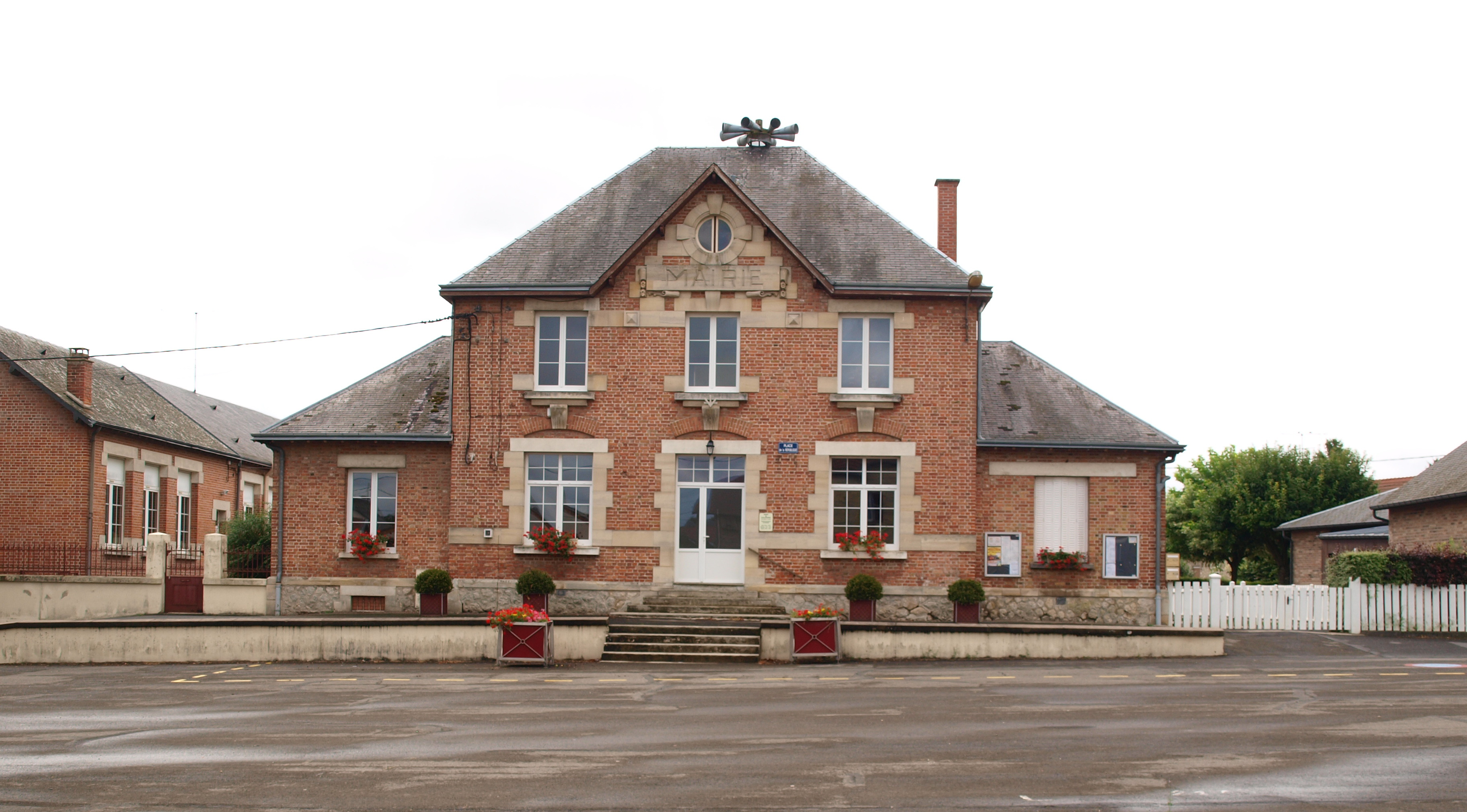
- The town hall in Challerange

- Coat of arms
- Location of Challerange
- Location within France Location within Grand Est
- Coordinates: 49°18′41″N 4°44′46″E
- Country: France
- Region: Grand Est
- Department: Ardennes
- Arrondissement: Vouziers
- Canton: Attigny
- Intercommunality: Argonne Ardennaise

Government
  - Mayor (2020–2026): Vincent Gavart
- Area^{1}: 11.13 km^{2} (4.30 sq mi)
- Elevation: 106 m (348 ft)
- Highest elevation: 129 m (423 ft)
- Lowest elevation: 100 m (330 ft)
- Population (2023): 417
  - Density: 37.5/km^{2} (97.0/sq mi)
- Time zone: UTC+01:00 (CET)
  - Summer (DST): UTC+02:00 (CEST)
- INSEE/Postal code: 08097 /08400
- ^{1} French Land Register data, which excludes lakes, ponds, glaciers > 1 km^{2} (0.386 sq mi or 247 acres) and river estuaries.

Challerange (French pronunciation: [ʃalʁɑ̃ʒ]) is a commune in the Ardennes department in northern France.

== Population ==
Historical population
| Year | Pop. | ±% p.a. |
|---|---|---|
| 1968 | 643 | — |
| 1975 | 659 | +0.35% |
| 1982 | 594 | −1.47% |
| 1990 | 514 | −1.79% |
| 1999 | 461 | −1.20% |
| 2007 | 435 | −0.72% |
| 2012 | 485 | +2.20% |
| 2017 | 447 | −1.62% |
| 2023 | 417 | −1.15% |
Source: INSEE

== See also ==
- Communes of the Ardennes department
