= Mouron =

- Commune
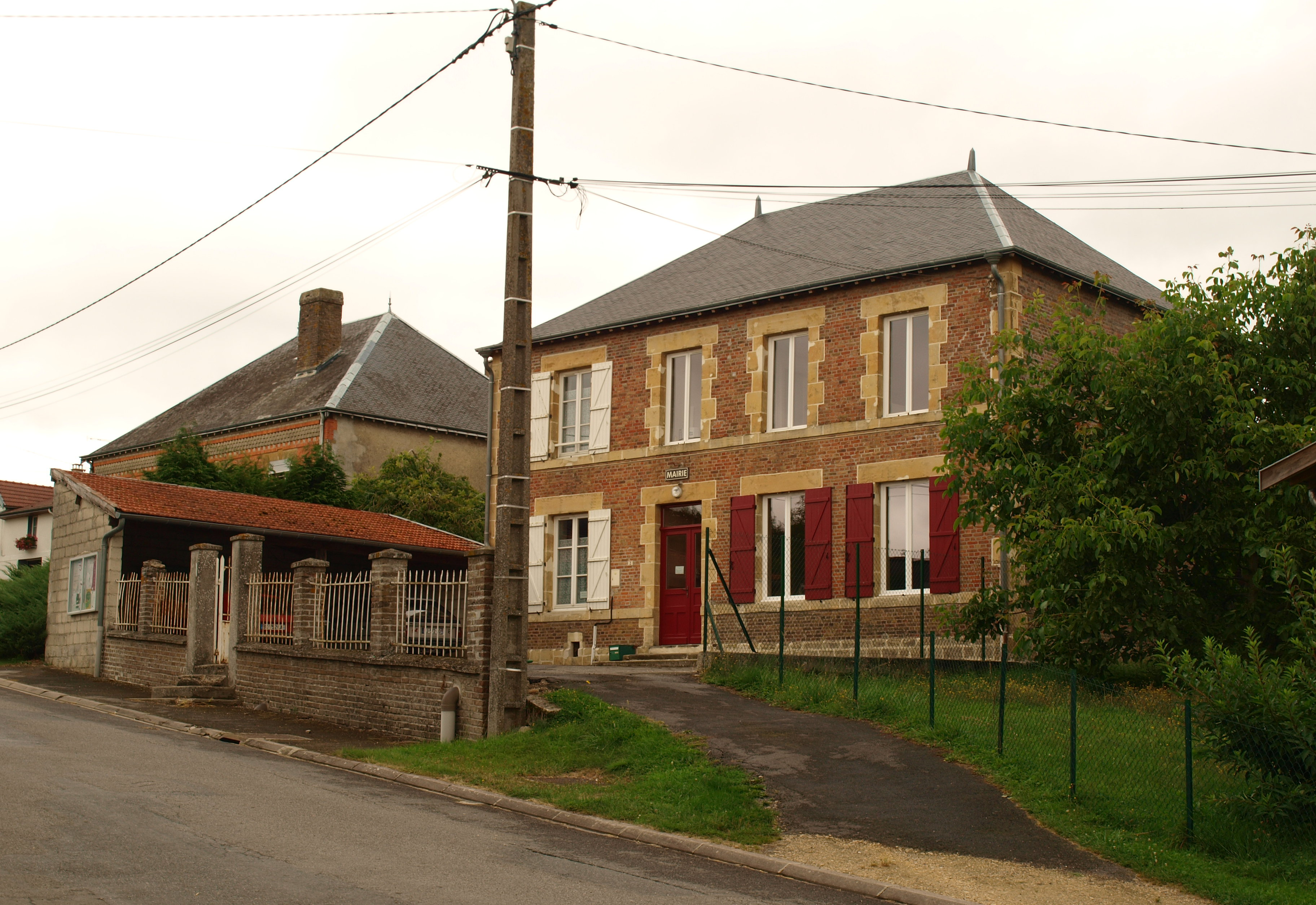
- The town hall in Mouron
- Location of Mouron
- Location within France Location within Grand Est
- Coordinates: 49°18′39″N 4°47′05″E
- Country: France
- Region: Grand Est
- Department: Ardennes
- Arrondissement: Vouziers
- Canton: Attigny
- Intercommunality: Argonne Ardennaise

Government
  - Mayor (2020–2026): Jean-Eric Manesse
- Area^{1}: 6.4 km^{2} (2.5 sq mi)
- Elevation: 140 m (460 ft)
- Highest elevation: 158 m (518 ft)
- Lowest elevation: 101 m (331 ft)
- Population (2023): 78
  - Density: 12/km^{2} (32/sq mi)
- Time zone: UTC+01:00 (CET)
  - Summer (DST): UTC+02:00 (CEST)
- INSEE/Postal code: 08310 /08250
- ^{1} French Land Register data, which excludes lakes, ponds, glaciers > 1 km^{2} (0.386 sq mi or 247 acres) and river estuaries.

Mouron (French pronunciation: [muʁɔ̃]) is a commune in the Ardennes department in northern France.

== Population ==
Historical population
Year	Pop.	±% p.a.
1968	130	—
1975	100	−3.68%
1982	81	−2.97%
1990	73	−1.29%
1999	79	+0.88%
2007	79	+0.00%
2012	82	+0.75%
2017	73	−2.30%
2023	78	+1.11%
Source: INSEE

== See also ==
- Communes of the Ardennes department
