= Manre =

- Commune
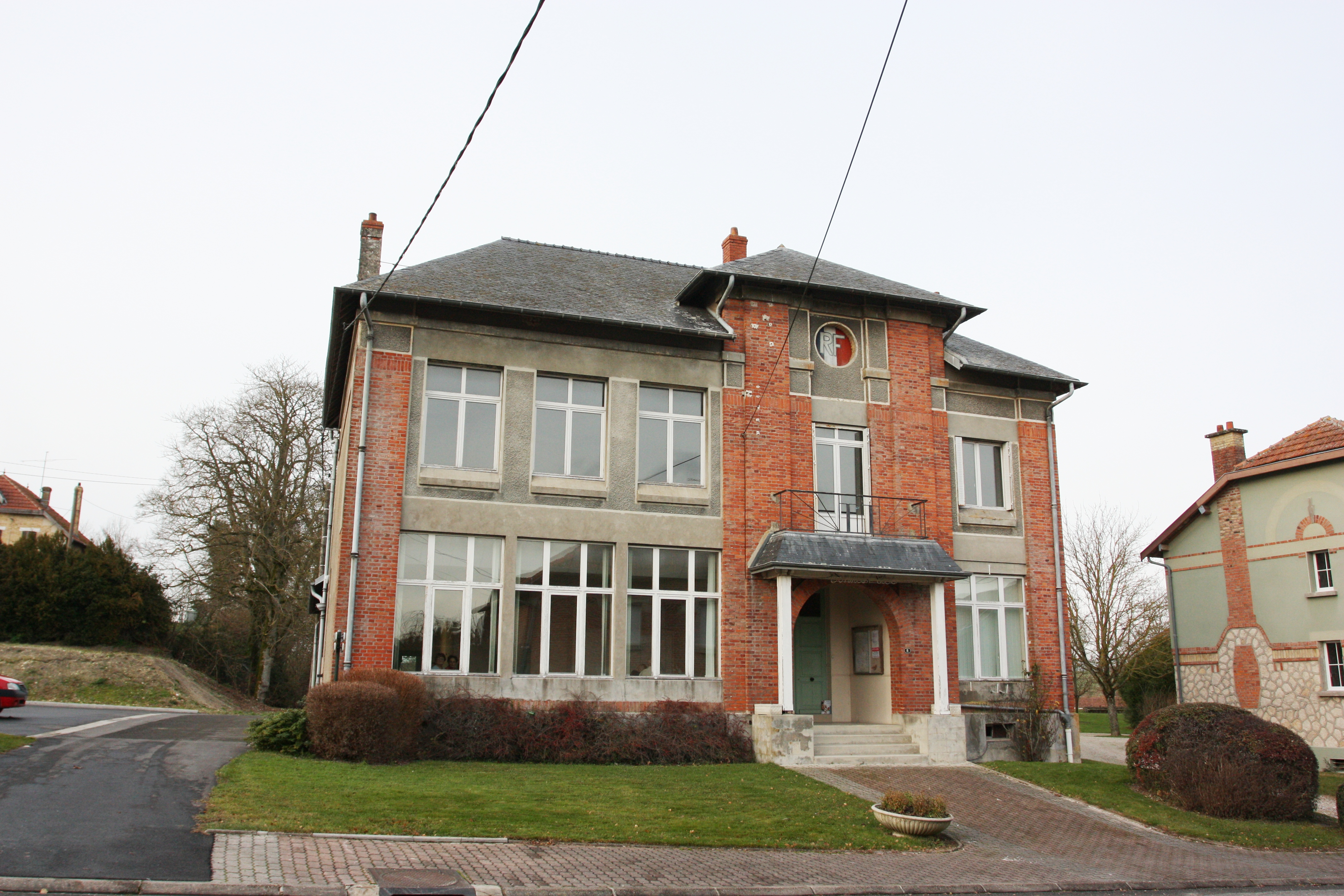
- Town hall
- Location of Manre
- Location within France Location within Grand Est
- Coordinates: 49°15′46″N 4°39′56″E
- Country: France
- Region: Grand Est
- Department: Ardennes
- Arrondissement: Vouziers
- Canton: Attigny
- Intercommunality: Argonne Ardennaise

Government
  - Mayor (2020–2026): Gérald Lorfeuvre
- Area^{1}: 18.5 km^{2} (7.1 sq mi)
- Elevation: 123 m (404 ft)
- Population (2023): 108
  - Density: 5.84/km^{2} (15.1/sq mi)
- Time zone: UTC+01:00 (CET)
  - Summer (DST): UTC+02:00 (CEST)
- INSEE/Postal code: 08271 /08400
- ^{1} French Land Register data, which excludes lakes, ponds, glaciers > 1 km^{2} (0.386 sq mi or 247 acres) and river estuaries.

Manre (French pronunciation: [mɑ̃ʁ]) is a commune in the Ardennes department in northern France.

== Population ==
Historical population
Year	Pop.	±% p.a.
1968	138	—
1975	138	+0.00%
1982	125	−1.40%
1990	114	−1.14%
1999	108	−0.60%
2007	127	+2.05%
2012	91	−6.45%
2017	100	+1.90%
2023	108	+1.29%
Source: INSEE

== See also ==
- Communes of the Ardennes department
