= Brécy-Brières =

- Commune
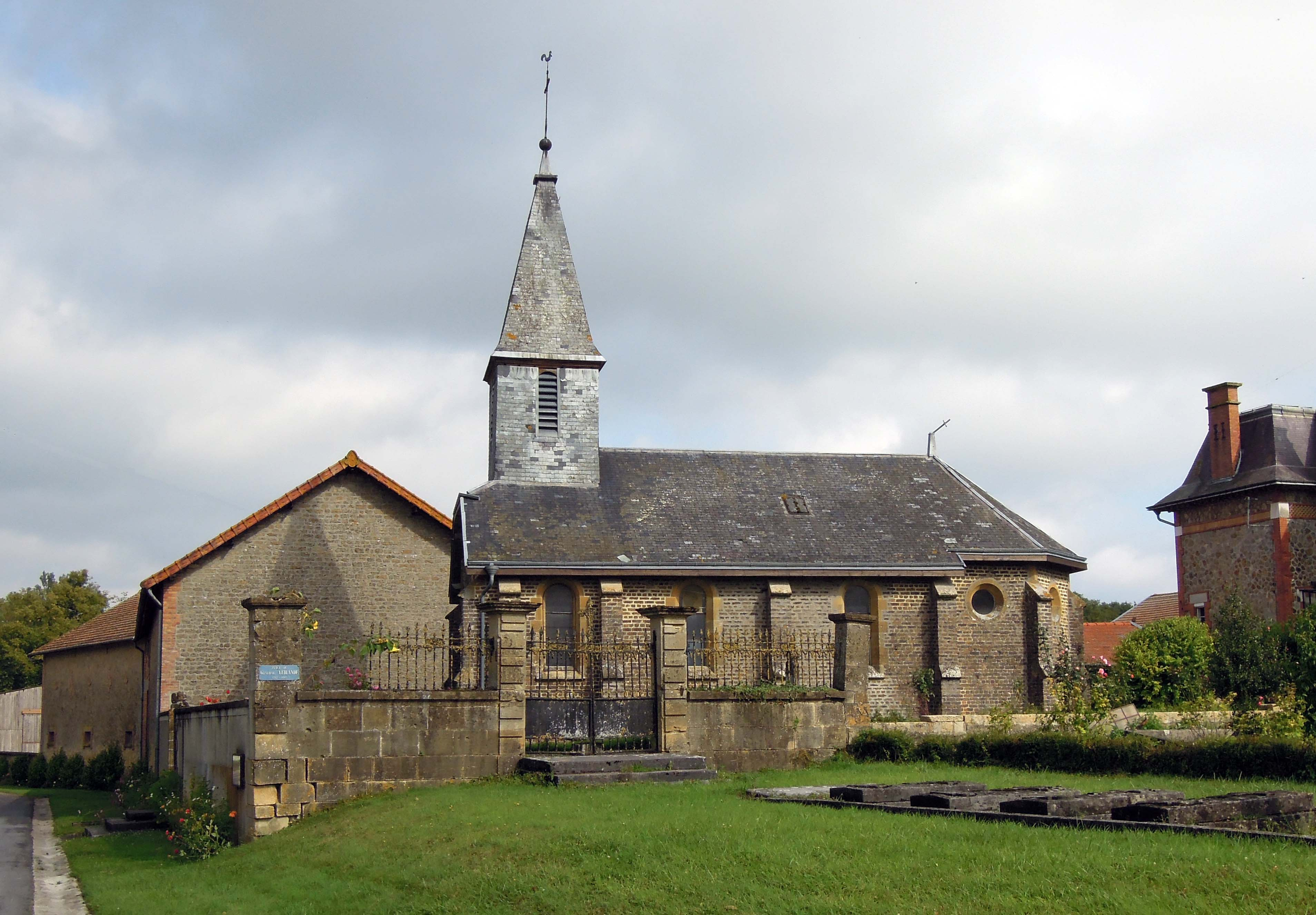
- The church in Brières
- Location of Brécy-Brières
- Location within France Location within Grand Est
- Coordinates: 49°19′25″N 4°45′59″E
- Country: France
- Region: Grand Est
- Department: Ardennes
- Arrondissement: Vouziers
- Canton: Attigny
- Intercommunality: Argonne Ardennaise

Government
  - Mayor (2020–2026): Jocelyne Henriette Oudet
- Area^{1}: 8.68 km^{2} (3.35 sq mi)
- Elevation: 109 m (358 ft)
- Highest elevation: 185 m (607 ft)
- Lowest elevation: 96 m (315 ft)
- Population (2023): 73
  - Density: 8.4/km^{2} (22/sq mi)
- Time zone: UTC+01:00 (CET)
  - Summer (DST): UTC+02:00 (CEST)
- INSEE/Postal code: 08082 /08400
- ^{1} French Land Register data, which excludes lakes, ponds, glaciers > 1 km^{2} (0.386 sq mi or 247 acres) and river estuaries.

Brécy-Brières (French pronunciation: [bʁesi bʁijɛʁ]) is a commune in the Ardennes department in northern France.

== Population ==
Historical population
Year	Pop.	±% p.a.
1968	109	—
1975	93	−2.24%
1982	84	−1.44%
1990	73	−1.74%
1999	84	+1.57%
2007	92	+1.14%
2012	69	−5.59%
2017	76	+1.95%
2023	73	−0.67%
Source: INSEE

== See also ==
- Communes of the Ardennes department
- List of medieval bridges in France
