= Synods held at Troyes =

Religious councils held in Troyes, France

There have been a number of synods held at Troyes:

== Council of 867 ==
The council was held on orders of Pope Nicholas I, to deal with Hincmar of Reims and his quarrels. The decrees were signed on 2 November 867. The Council ruled that no bishop could be deposed from his See without the consent of the Pope.

=== Bishops present ===
- Hincmar, Archbishop of Reims
- Herard, Bishop of Tours
- Wenilo, Bishop of Rouen
- Frotarius, Bishop of Bordeaux
- Hegilo, Bishop of Sens
- Wulfad, Bishop of Bourges
- Rothadus, Bishop of Soissons
- Actardus, Bishop of Nantes
- Hildegarius, Bishop of Meaux
- Aeneas, Bishop of Paris
- Hincmar, Bishop of Laon
- Gislibertus, Bishop of Chartres
- Ercanraus, Bishop of Châlons-sur-Marne
- Ercambertus, Bishop of Bayeux
- Odo, Bishop of
- Folcricus, Bishop of Saint-Paul-Trois-Châteaux
- Livido, Bishop of Autun
- Ioannes, Bishop of Cambrai
- Hilduinus, Bishop of Évreux
- Abbo, Bishop of Nevers

== Council of 878 (Second Council of Troyes) ==
- 878 Second Council of Troyes
  - Pope John VIII proclaimed that no bishop could be deposed without reference to the Holy See

=== Bishops present ===
- John, Bishop of Rome
- Walbertus, Bishop of Porto
- Petrus, Bishop of Forum Sempronii (Fossombrone)
- Pascasius, Bishop
- Hincmar, Archbishop of Reims
- Ansegisus, Archbishop of Sens
- Aurelianus, Archbishop of Lyon
- Sigebodus, Archbishop of Narbonne
- Rostagnus, Archbishop of Arles
- Adalardus, Archbishop of Tours
- Teudericus Archbishop of Besançon
- Ottramnus, Archbishop of Vienne
- Isaac, Bishop of Langres
- Gerboldus, Bishop of Châlons-sur-Saône
- Agilmarus, Bishop of Clermont (Arvernensis)
- Bernerus, Bishop of Grenoble
- Abbo, Bishop of Nevers
- Ottulfus, Bishop of Tréguier
- Gislibertus, Bishop of Chartres
- Walefridus, Bishop of Uzés
- Hildebaldus, Bishop of Soissons
- Teutherus, Bishop of Gerona
- Ingelwinus, Bishop of Paris
- Edenulfus, Bishop of Laon
- Adebertus, Bishop of Senlis
- Berno, Bishop of Chalons
- Maricus, Bishop of Béziers
- Ecfridus, Bishop of Poitiers
- Abbo, Bishop of Maguelonne
- Frodoinus, Bishop of Barcelona
- Arnaldus, Bishop of Toul

== Council of 1078 ==
Summoned by Archbishop Hugh of Die and the Abbot of Cluny.

== Council of 1104 ==
Convened by Cardinal Richard, Bishop of Albano, Papal Legate

== Council of 1107 ==
Convened on 23 May 1107 by Pope Paschal II personally. Rothard, Bishop of Mainz, was suspended from office because he had dared to reconcile a schismatic bishop, Udo of Hildesheim, to the Church.

=== Bishops attending ===
No complete list survives. Some bishops who probably attended can be discovered in surviving documents:

- Pope Paschal II
- Cardinal Richard, Bishop of Albano
- Aldo, Bishop of Piacenza
- Odo, Bishop of Cambrai
- Leodegarus, Bishop of Bourges
- Girard, Bishop of Angoulême
- Ildebertus, Bishop of Le Mans
- Ioannes, Bishop of Thérouanne
- Gotofridus, Bishop of Amiens
- Galo, Bishop of Paris
- Lambertus, Bishop of Arras

== Council of 1129 ==
- 1129 (Note: sometimes listed as 1128) - convened by Bernard of Clairvaux: (Note: Piers Paul Read states the papal legate Matthew, cardinal-bishop of Albano, presided over the council.)
  - recognized and confirmed the Order of the Knights Templar
  - solved disputes involving the Bishop of Paris

== Bibliography ==
- Ben-Ami, Aharon (1969). Social Change in a Hostile Environment: The Crusaders' Kingdom of Jerusalem. Princeton University Press.
- Barber, Malcolm (1995). The New Knighthood: A History of the Order of the Temple. Cambridge University Press. ISBN 0521420415.
- Hefele, Charles Joseph (1911). Histoire des conciles Tome IV, deuxième partie. Paris: Letouzey. pp. 666–678. (tr. H. Leclercq)
- Hefele, Charles Joseph (1870). Histoire des conciles Tome V. Paris: Letouzey. pp. 528–550. (tr. H. Leclercq)[Council of Troyes, 867]
- Lalore, Charles (1867). Les synodes du diocèse de Troyes (in French). Troyes: E. Caffé.
- Read, Piers Paul (1999). The Templars. Da Capo Press. ISBN 9780306814969.
- Sirmond, Jacques (1629). Concilia antiqua Galliae tres in tomos ordine digesta. Cum epistolis pontificum, principum constitutionibus, & aliis Gallicanae rei ecclesiasticae monimentis. Quorum plurima vel integra, vel magna ex parte, nunc primum in lucem exeunt. Opera & studio Iacobi Sirmondi Societatis Iesu presbyteri. Tomus 1. [-3.] (in Latin). Paris: Sebastien Cramoisy.
