= Stodilo =

Stodilo (or Stodilus, French: Stodile; died c. 861) was the bishop of Limoges from the early 840s until his death. His unusual name may be a corruption of the Latin stolidus (stolid, stupid), a humble reference to Christian "foolishness" in the eyes of unbelievers.

The earliest reference to an ecclesiastical court in southern France dates from 851, when Stodilo judged a case between a vassal (vassus) of his and his cathedral over a piece of land the vassal had unjustly possessed. This document doubles as an early piece of evidence of feudo-vassalic relations in the Limousin. In 845, Stodilo received from King Pippin II two villas from the royal fisc.

In the autumn of 855, Stodilo assisted Archbishop Rodulf of Bourges in the unction, coronation and investiture of Charles the Child as king of Aquitaine in Limoges, according to the Annales Bertiniani and the Chronicon of Adhemar of Chabannes. Stodilo may have been one of the guardians (bajuli) for the young king.

In 859 Rodulf gave Stodilo and his successors a privately owned church "from his own alod". In exchange, Stodilo gave Rodulf a diocesan church, that is, "from the possessions of Saint Stephen", the patron saint of Limoges, to be held by Rodulf "as his alod". Both church lay within the diocese of Limoges. On his new acquisition, Rodulf founded the monastery of Beaulieu. When he consecrated the new community in 860, Stodilo was among the witnesses.

== Sources ==
- Beitscher, J. K. (1974). "Monastic Reform at Beaulieu, 1031–1095". Viator. 5: 199–210. doi:10.1484/J.VIATOR.2.301622.
- Le Blant, E.-F. (1864). "Recherches sur quelques noms bizarres adoptés par les premiers chrétiens". Revue Archéologique. Nouvelle Série. 10: 4–11. JSTOR 41734279.
- Lewis, A. R. (1964). "Count Gerald of Aurillac and Feudalism in South Central France in the Early Tenth Century". Traditio. 20: 41–58. doi:10.1017/S0362152900016305.
- Lewis, A. R. (1965). The Development of Southern French and Catalan Society, 718–1050. Austin: University of Texas Press.
- Nelson, J. L. (1992). Charles the Bald. London: Longman.
- Orlowski, Tomasz H. (1987). "La statue équestre de Limoges et le sacre de Charles l'Enfant: Contribution à l'étude de l'iconographie politique carolingienne". Cahiers de civilisation médiévale. 30 (118): 131–44. doi:10.3406/ccmed.1987.2360.
- Wood, Susan (2006). The Proprietary Church in the Medieval West. Oxford: Oxford University Press.
