= Saint Rudolph =

Saint Rudolph may refer to:

- Rodulf (archbishop of Bourges) († 866)
- Rudolph of Gubbio († 1066)
- St. Rudolph, a fictional Japanese school from The Prince of Tennis, see List of The Prince of Tennis characters#St. Rudolph
