= Attigny, Ardennes =

Attigny
- Commune
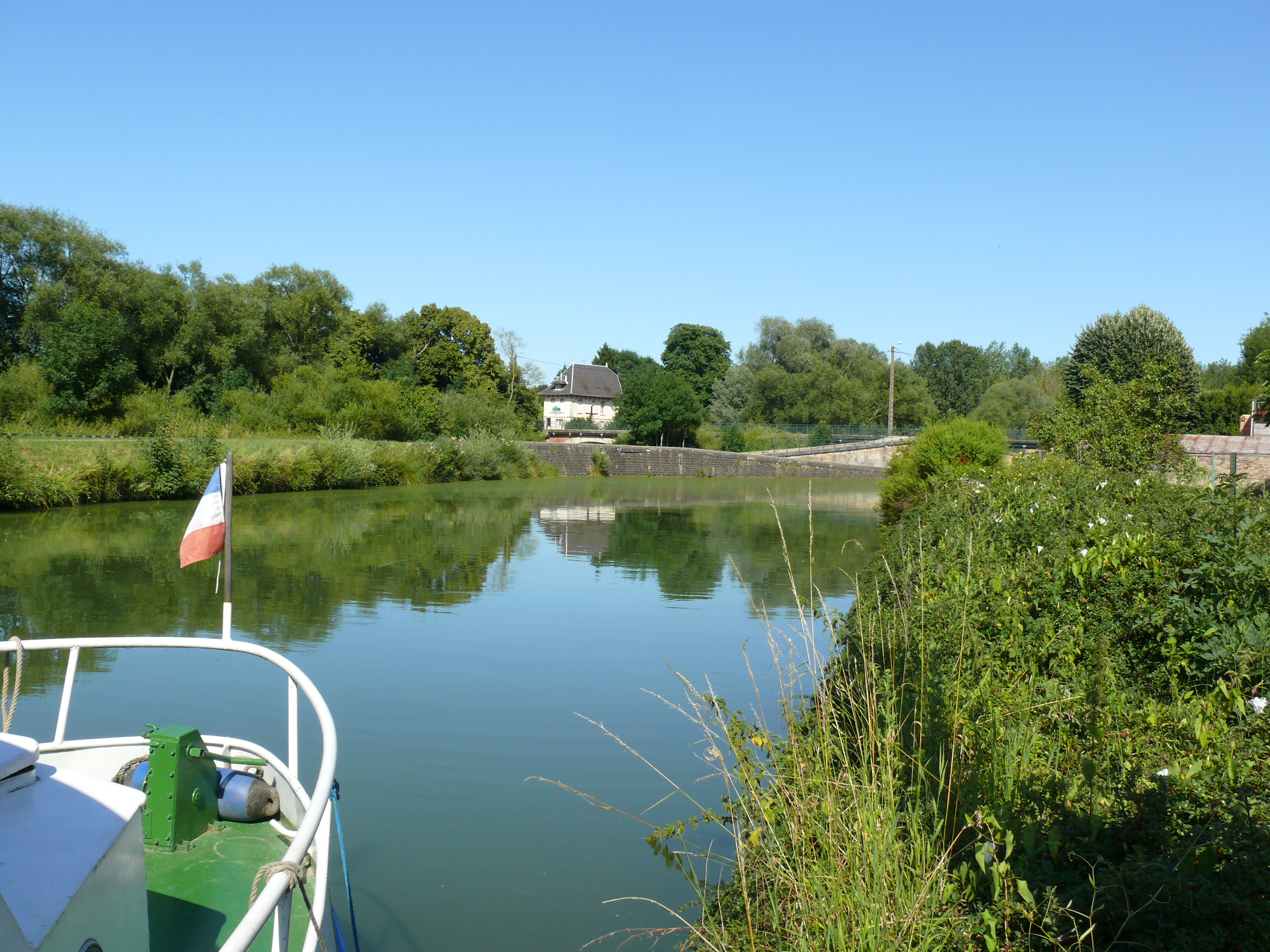
- The Canal des Ardennes at Attigny

- Coat of arms
- Location of Attigny
- Location within France Location within Grand Est
- Coordinates: 49°28′42″N 4°34′42″E
- Country: France
- Region: Grand Est
- Department: Ardennes
- Arrondissement: Vouziers
- Canton: Attigny
- Intercommunality: CC des Crêtes Préardennaises

Government
  - Mayor (2020–2026): Chantal Henriet
- Area^{1}: 11.46 km^{2} (4.42 sq mi)
- Elevation: 83 m (272 ft)
- Highest elevation: 133 m (436 ft)
- Lowest elevation: 77 m (253 ft)
- Population (2023): 1,094
  - Density: 95.46/km^{2} (247.2/sq mi)
- Time zone: UTC+01:00 (CET)
  - Summer (DST): UTC+02:00 (CEST)
- INSEE/Postal code: 08025 /08130
- ^{1} French Land Register data, which excludes lakes, ponds, glaciers > 1 km^{2} (0.386 sq mi or 247 acres) and river estuaries.

Attigny (French pronunciation: [atiɲi]) is a commune in the Ardennes department in the Grand Est region of north-eastern France.

== Geography ==
Attigny is located some 16 km east by south-east of Rethel and 14 km west by south-west of Le Chesne. Access to the commune is by the D 987 road from Charbogne in the north passing through the village and continuing south to Coulommes-et-Marqueny. The D 983 road comes from Givry in the west passing through the village and continuing south-east to Vrizy. The D 25 road comes from Saulces-Champenoises in the south-west merging with the D 983 west of the village then continuing north-east to Rilly-sur-Aisne. There is also a railway with a station just north of the village. There is the hamlet of La Couture east of the village. The town has a large residential area with the rest of the commune farmland.

The river Aisne runs through the commune as it flows west to eventually join the Seine at Conflans-Sainte-Honorine. The Ardennes Canal is close to and parallel to the Aisne. The Ruisseau de Saint-Lambert flows into the Aisne from the north.

== History ==
=== Middle Ages ===
In the Middle Ages Attigny had some importance as it had a royal residence there since Clovis II built a palace there in 647. It was also the Carolingian imperial residence, and Charlemagne is said to have attended many Christmas and Easter festivals there. Charles the Bald stayed many times at the palace.

The first council of Attigny was convened in 765 by Pepin the Short. It was a general assembly of the Frankish nation that was continued as a synodal council.

The council made a decree, pro causa religionis et salute animarum, which was signed by twenty-seven bishops (including the bishops: Remigius of Rouen, Jacob de Toul (24th Bishop of Toul), Chrodegang of Metz, Magdalvé of Verdun, Fulcaire or Tungrensis of Liège, Maurinus of Évreux, Willicaire of Vienne) and seventeen abbots (such as Abbot Godobert of Rebais). It involved a form of alliance in the event of death. Each of the bishops and abbots who signed this document, on the death of a member of the alliance, committed to sing 100 psalms and the priests to celebrate 100 Masses. Each of the bishops himself was to celebrate thirty masses and if he was prevented by illness or some other cause, he should appoint another bishop care to celebrate for him. Similarly, the abbots who were not bishops should appoint a bishop to say these thirty masses. Finally the monks who were priests were to celebrate 100 Masses and the monks who were not should sing 100 psalms.

In 785, Charlemagne held a council at Attigny where Saxon Duke Widukind, main enemy of Charlemagne during his wars against the Saxons (772-805), and Aboin received baptism from Charlemagne.

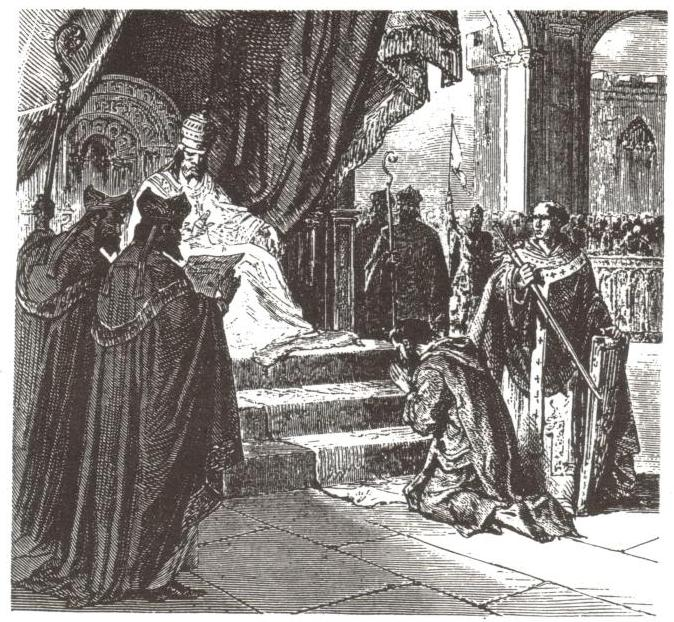
Louis the Pious doing penance at Attigny in 822

In 822, Pope Paschal I was present at a council of Attigny, convened for the reconciliation of the emperor Louis the Pious with his three younger brothers, Hugo, Drogo and Theodoric, whom he had caused to be violently tortured and whom he had intended to put to death. In the council he confessed publicly his wrongdoing; also the violence practiced by him on his nephew, Bernard, King of Italy, and his brother, the Abbot, Adelard Wala, and proposed to perform public penance in imitation of the emperor Theodosius I. He also exhibited an earnest desire to correct abuses arising from the negligence of the bishops and the nobles and confirmed the rule (Aquensis Regula) that the Council of Aachen had drawn up in 816 for canons and monks.

In 870, thirty bishops and six archbishops met at Attigny to pass judgement on Carloman, the king's son, who was made an ecclesiastic at an early age and accused by his father of conspiring against his life and throne. He was deprived of his abbeys and imprisoned at Senlis.

In the council of 875 Hincmar, Bishop of Laon, appealed to the pope for his uncle, Hincmar, Archbishop of Reims.

In 880 the Battle of Attigny was fought between a Carolingian coalition against an army of Boso, the self-proclaimed King of Provence.

In 916 Charles the Simple transported relics of Saint Walpurga to Attigny and founded a chapel served by twelve canons and his intention was that this chapel would be subject to the Abbey of Saint-Corneille at Compiègne.

The Carolingians abandoned the residence before 931 and the palace disappeared after the 10th century. Attigny was also a royal domain and remained so when it ceased to be a royal residence of the Carolingians. At the beginning of the 10th century, it encompassed at least 3,500 hectares. Donations of land to the Church remained limited. The domain passed almost intact to the smaller Capetian royal domain. It formed the dowry of the daughter of Philip I, Constance, on her marriage to Hugh, Count of Champagne, in 1093. The domain was split apart by the prince, especially for the benefit of Reims Cathedral, and is the origin of the ecclesiastical lordships of Attigny and Sainte-Vaubourg.

A leper colony was documented in the 14th century.

=== Contemporary era ===
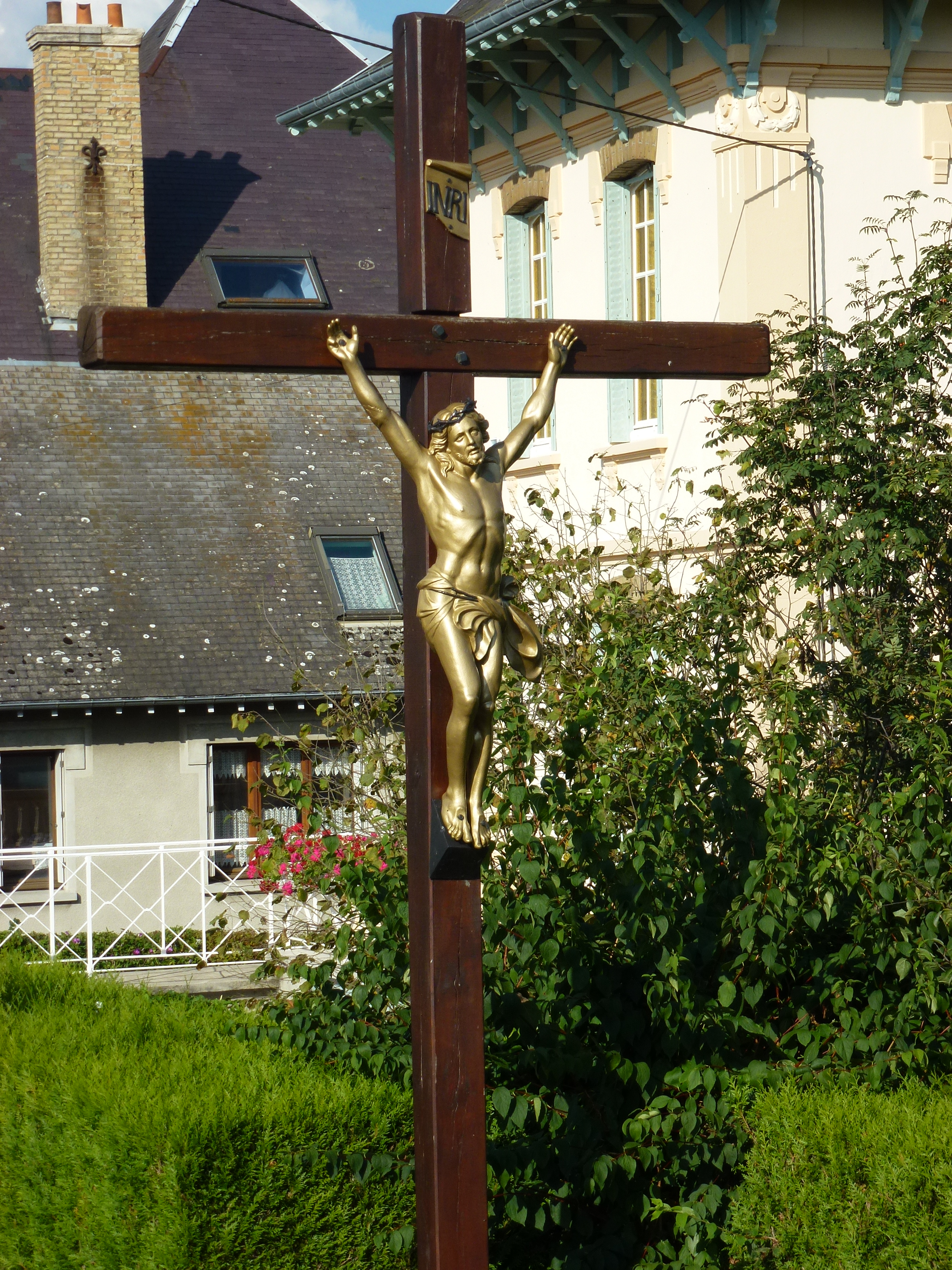
Wayside cross near the bridge

Reconciliation plaque

The town was badly damaged in World War I and World War II.

From 14 May to 10 June 1940 the 18th Infantry Regiment of Pau fought at Attigny. For 25 consecutive days it repelled successive attacks by an enemy superior in numbers and resources. They left their position in order, their flanks being threatened by the German advance.

The town was destroyed in 1914 and 1940. Attigny holds two Croix de Guerre, one from each world war. A monument to the 18th Infantry Regiment was inaugurated on 20 September 1947 near the canal bridge. A plaque celebrating Franco-German reconciliation was later affixed by the Fellowship of the French 18th regiment and the German 20th Infantry Regiment of Ratisbonne. This regiment was part of the attacking German forces at Attigny.

The commune has been awarded one flower by the Conseil national des villes et villages fleuris in the Concours des villes et villages fleuris.

=== Heraldry ===
Arms of Attigny	Blazon: Or, a double-headed eagle of Sable, beaked, langued, and membered in Gules.

=== Decorations ===
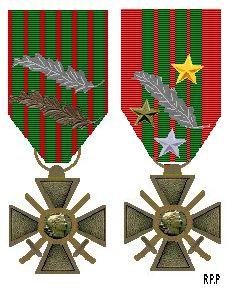

Croix de guerre 1914-1918 : 4 September 1920

Croix de guerre 1939-1945 : 12 February 1949

== Administration ==
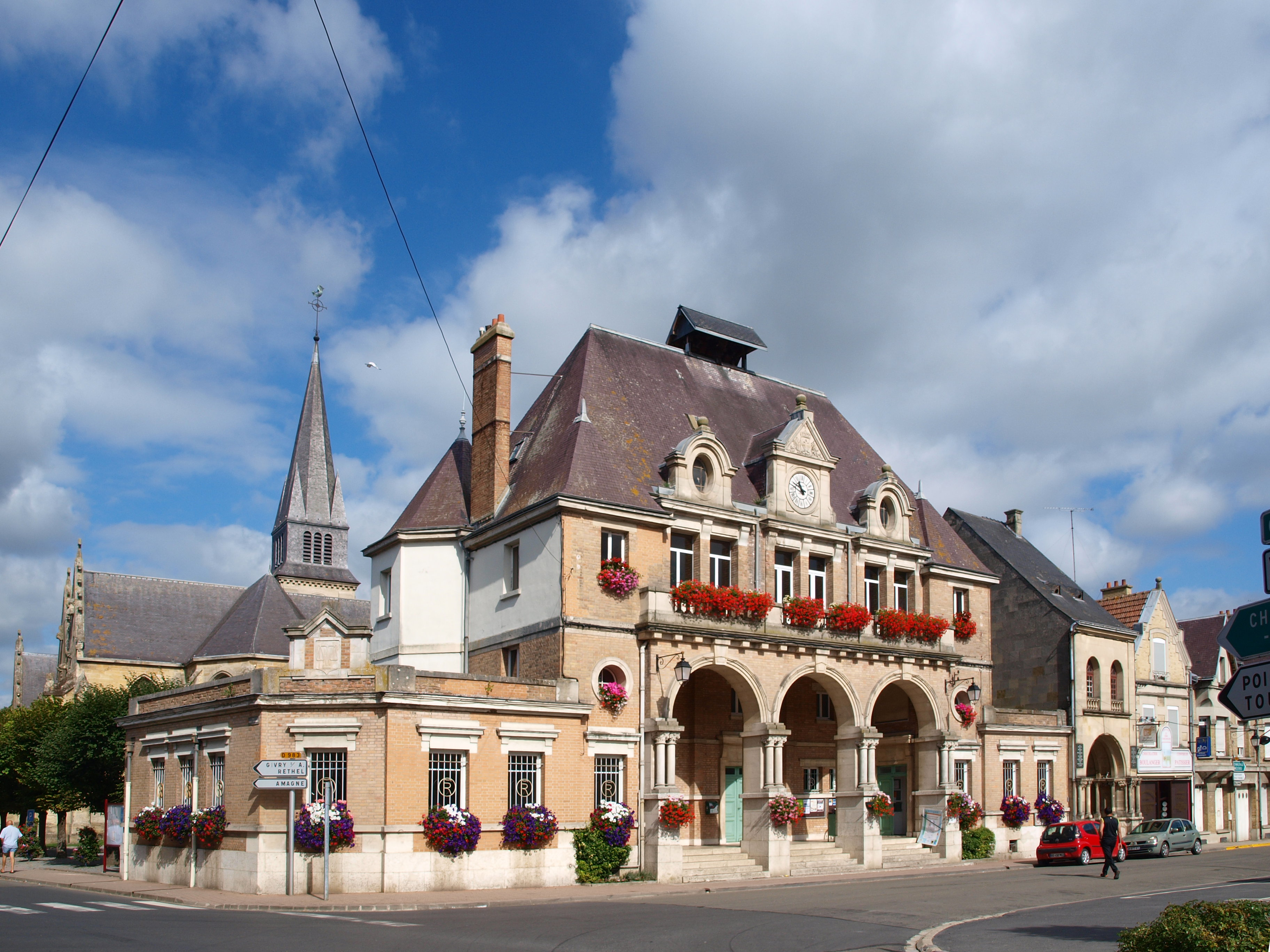
The Town Hall and Dome of Charlemagne

List of Successive Mayors

From	To	Name
1995	2006	Michel Bazelaire
2006	2020	Noël Bourgeois
2020	current	Chantal Henriet

== Demography ==
The inhabitants of the commune are known as Attignatiens in French.

Historical population

Year	Pop.	±% p.a.
1793	921	—
1800	1,007	+1.28%
1806	1,046	+0.64%
1821	1,006	−0.26%
1831	1,162	+1.45%
1836	1,258	+1.60%
1841	1,365	+1.65%
1846	1,415	+0.72%
1851	1,416	+0.01%
1866	1,611	+0.86%
1872	1,827	+2.12%
1876	1,873	+0.62%
1881	1,879	+0.06%
1886	1,863	−0.17%
1891	1,886	+0.25%
1896	1,797	−0.96%
1901	1,723	−0.84%
1906	1,682	−0.48%

Year	Pop.	±% p.a.
1911	1,721	+0.46%
1921	995	−5.33%
1926	1,436	+7.61%
1931	1,453	+0.24%
1936	1,450	−0.04%
1946	1,210	−1.79%
1954	1,425	+2.07%
1962	1,525	+0.85%
1968	1,536	+0.12%
1975	1,445	−0.87%
1982	1,265	−1.88%
1990	1,216	−0.49%
1999	1,200	−0.15%
2007	1,178	−0.23%
2012	1,240	+1.03%
2017	1,128	−1.88%
2023	1,094	−0.51%

Source: EHESS and INSEE

== Culture and heritage ==
=== Civil heritage ===
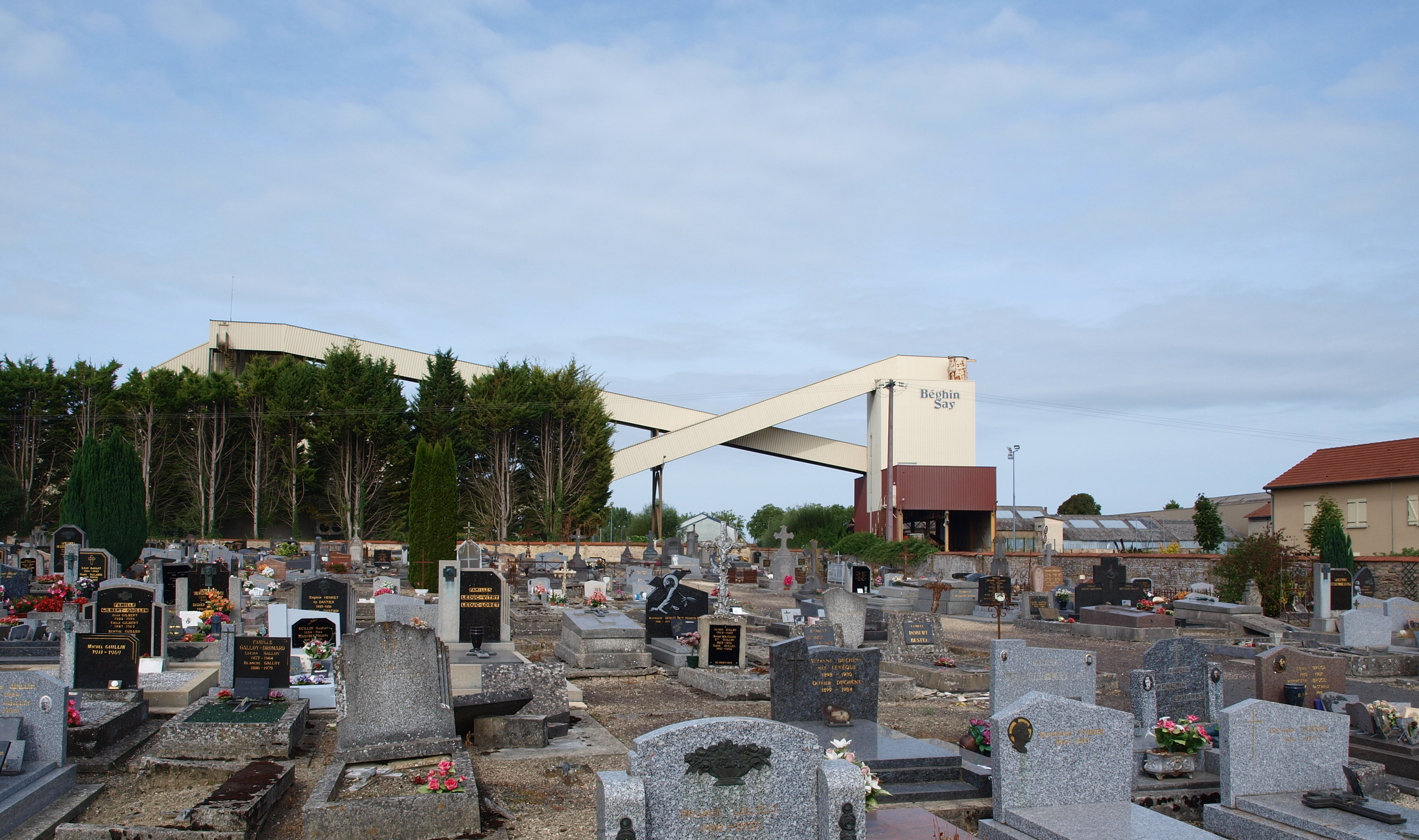
The sugar refinery

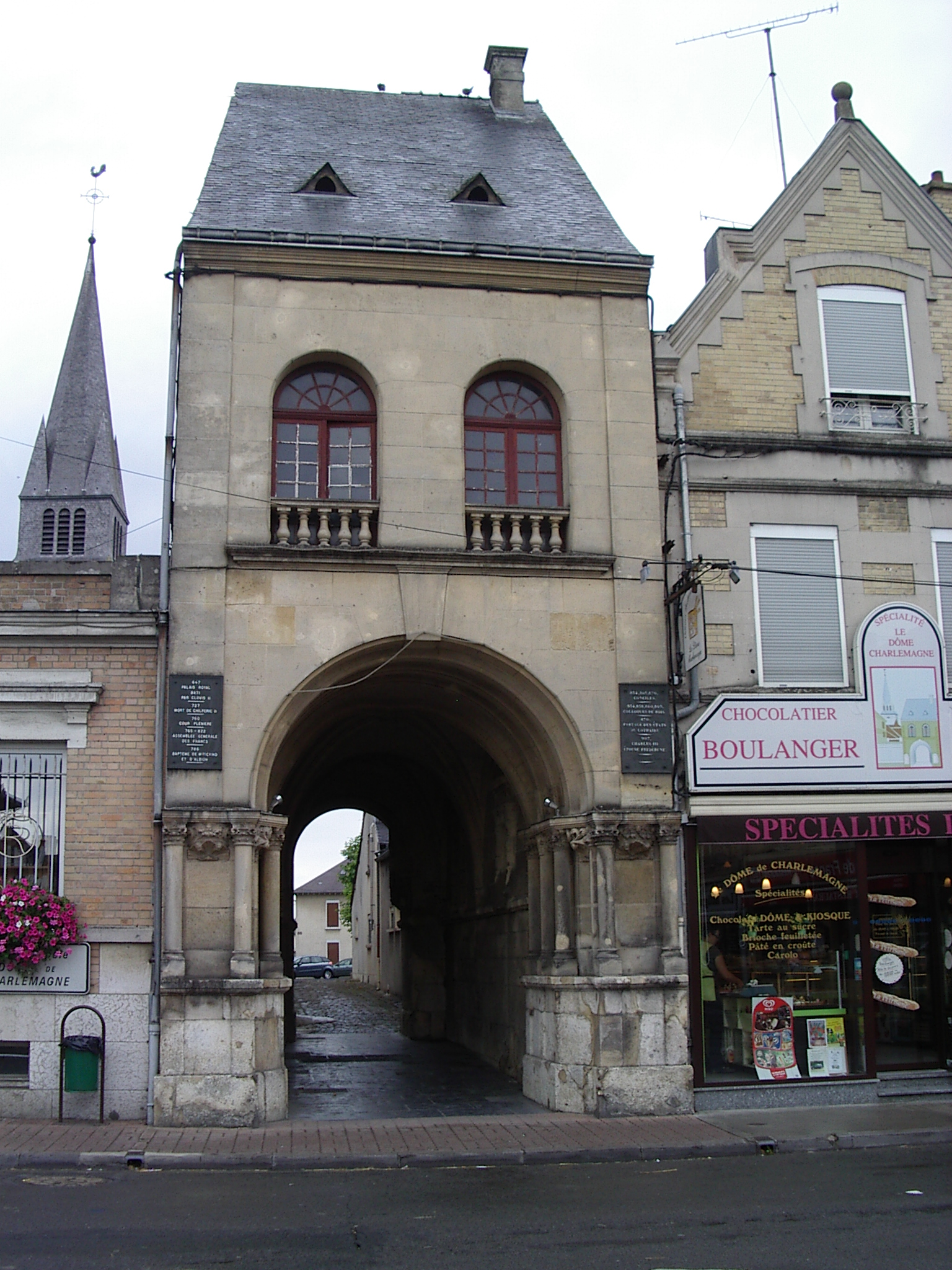
Palace of Charlemagne

The commune has a number of buildings and structures that are registered as historical monuments:

- A sugar refinery (1864)
- A milk and cheese factory (20th century)
- A brick factory (1919)
- The Palace of Charlemagne (16th century)

The Town Hall contains a Painting with frame: Marriage in Assyria (19th century) which is registered as a historical object.

=== Religious heritage ===
The Church of Notre-Dame (11th century) is registered as a historical monument.

The Church contains several items that are registered as historical objects:

- Bas-relief: Descent from the Cross (16th century)
- 4 Statues: Saints Nicolas, Éloi, Marthe, and Laurent (16th century)
- Tombstone (17th century)
- Stained glass windows (15th century)
- Main Altar (17th century)

The Church

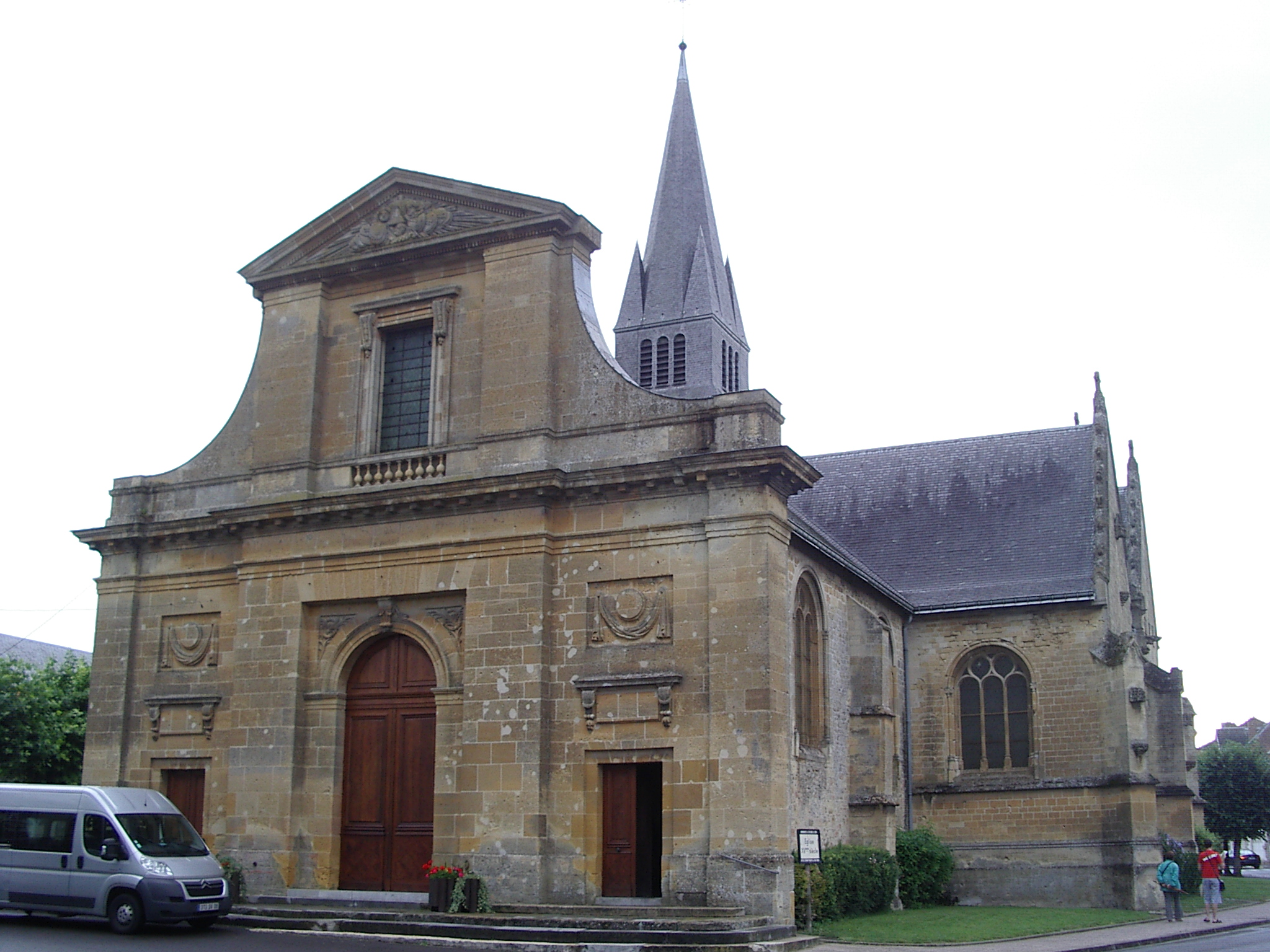
Church of Notre-Dame

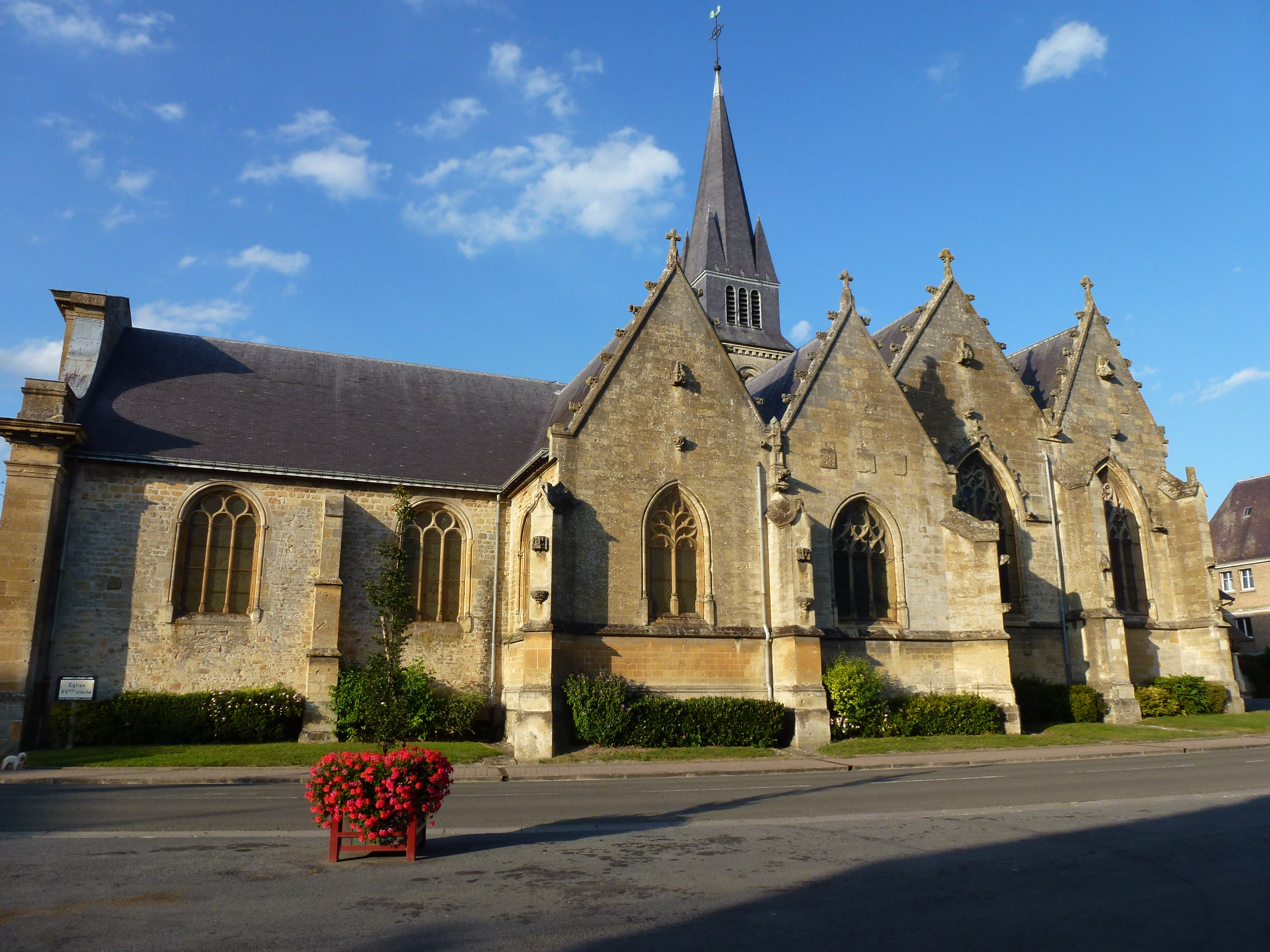
Church of Notre Dame from the south

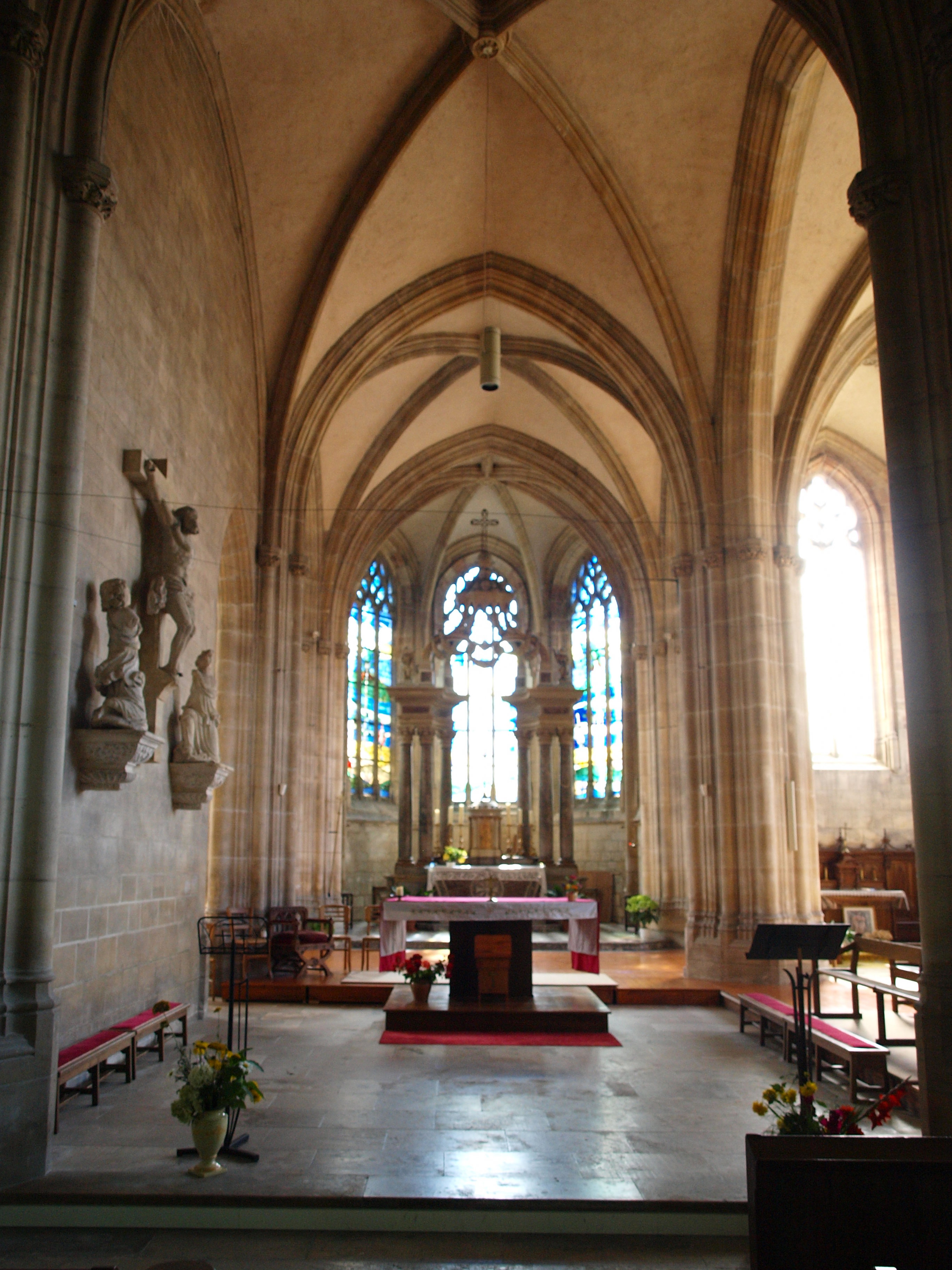
The Altar

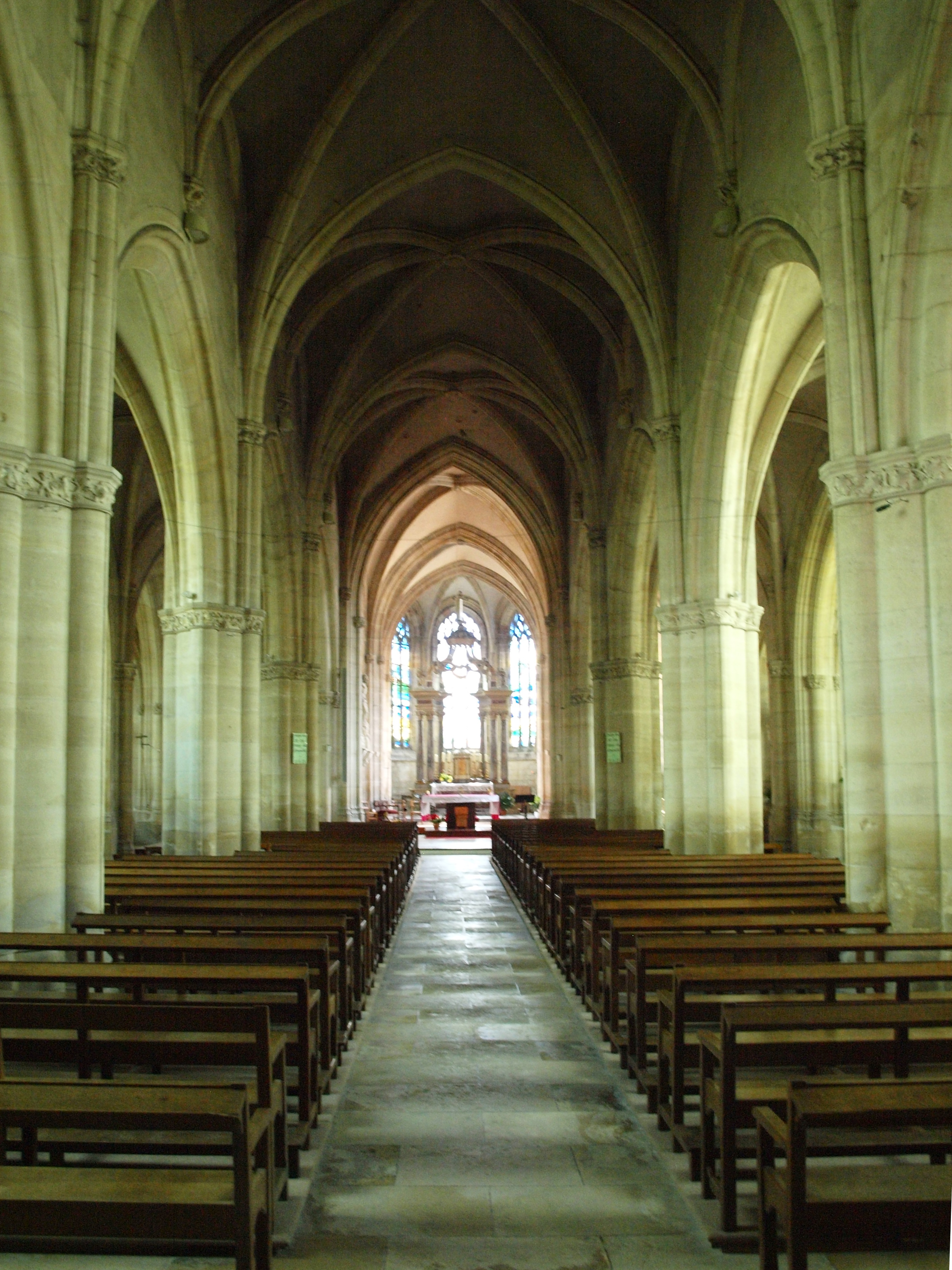
The Nave

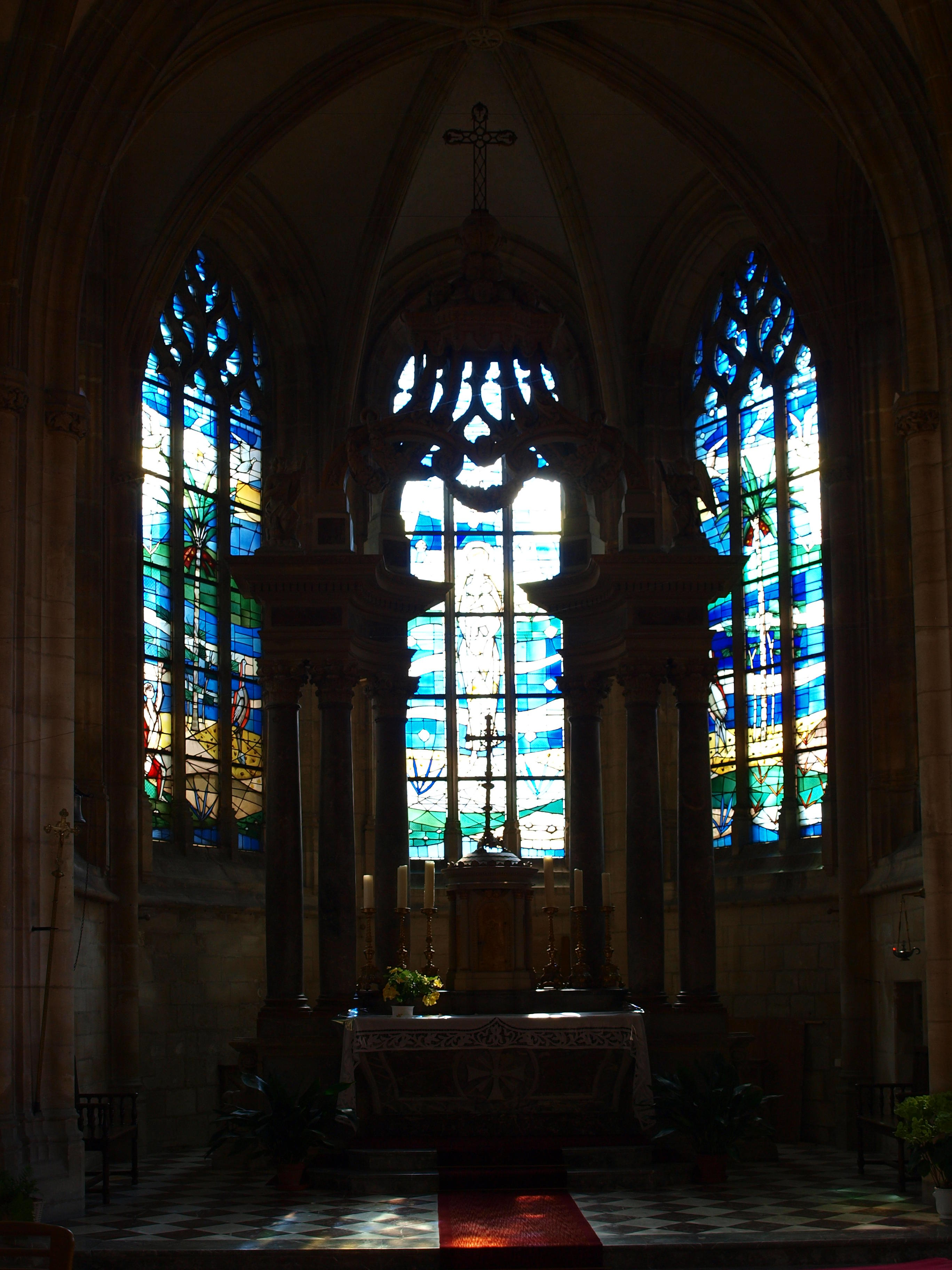
Stained glass windows

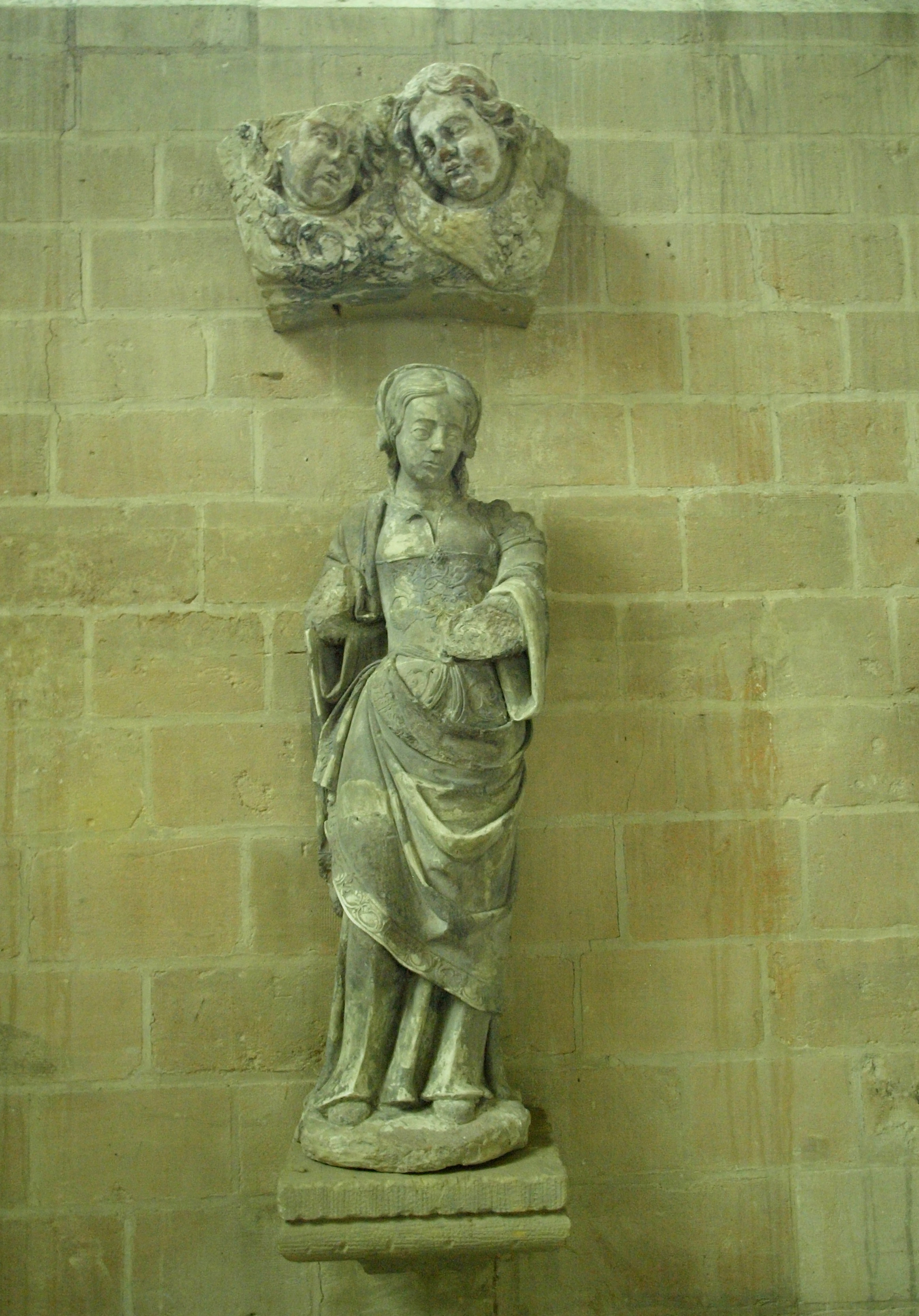
Statue

Other sights in the commune

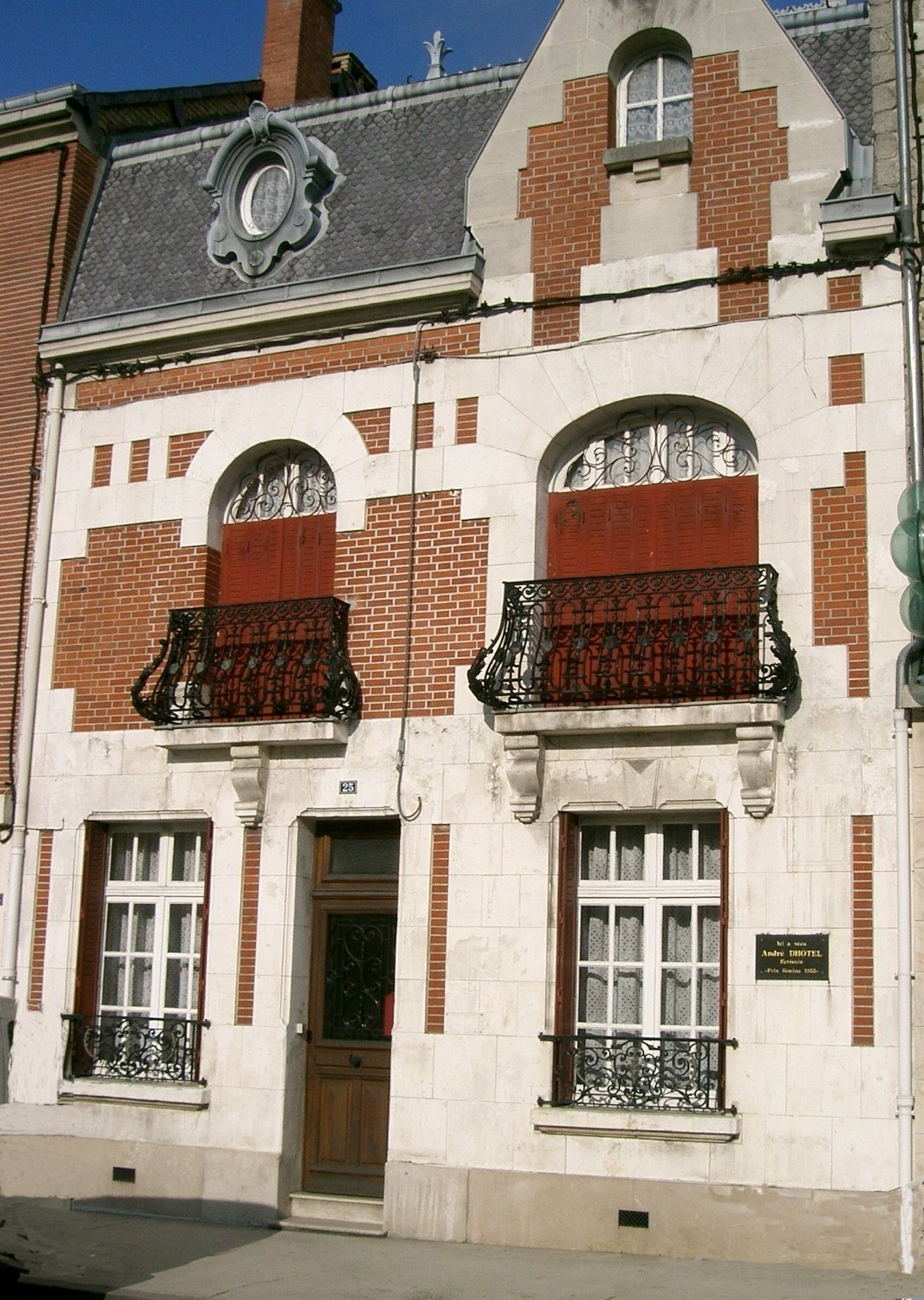
House of André Dhôtel

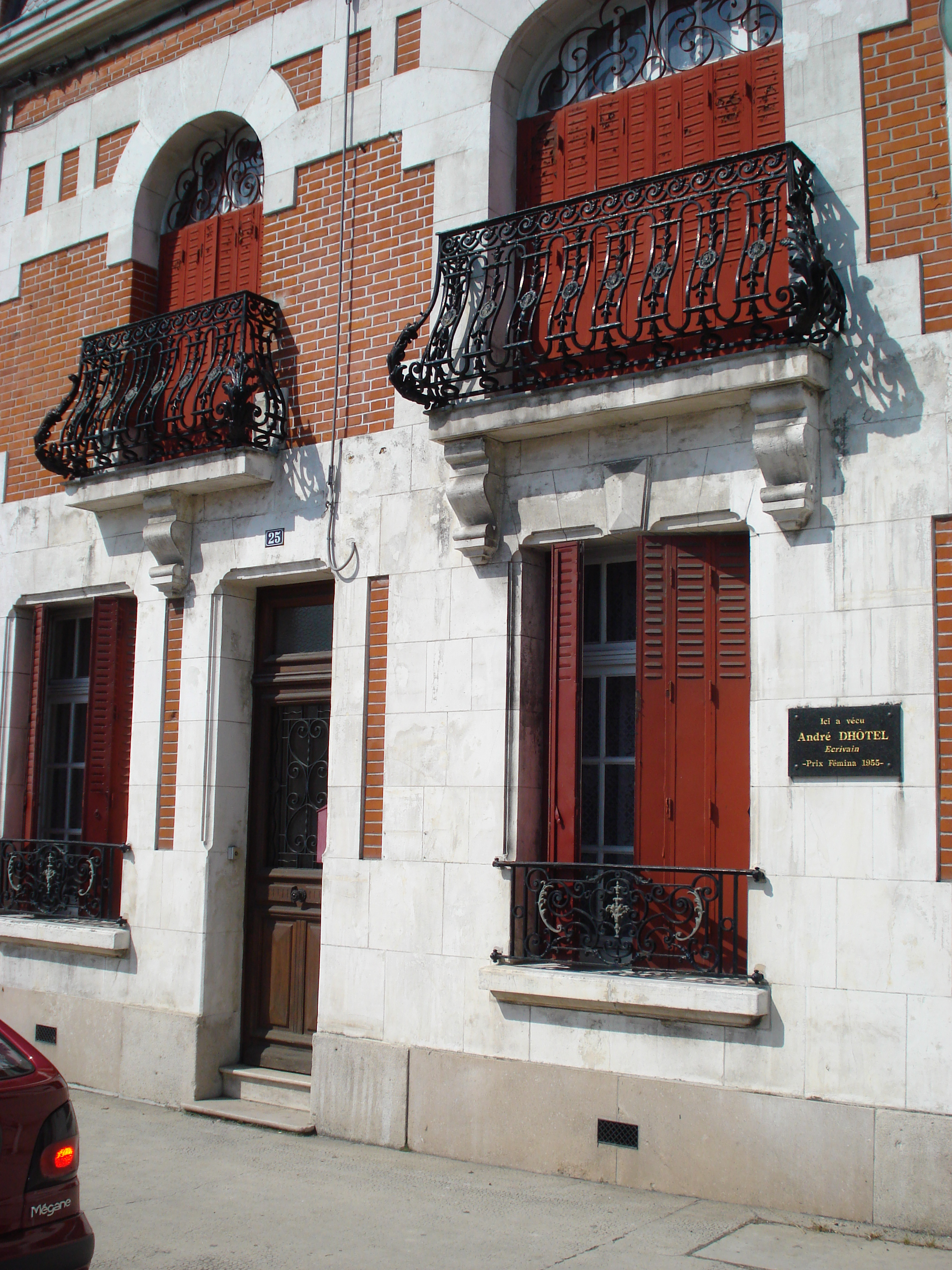
House of André Dhôtel

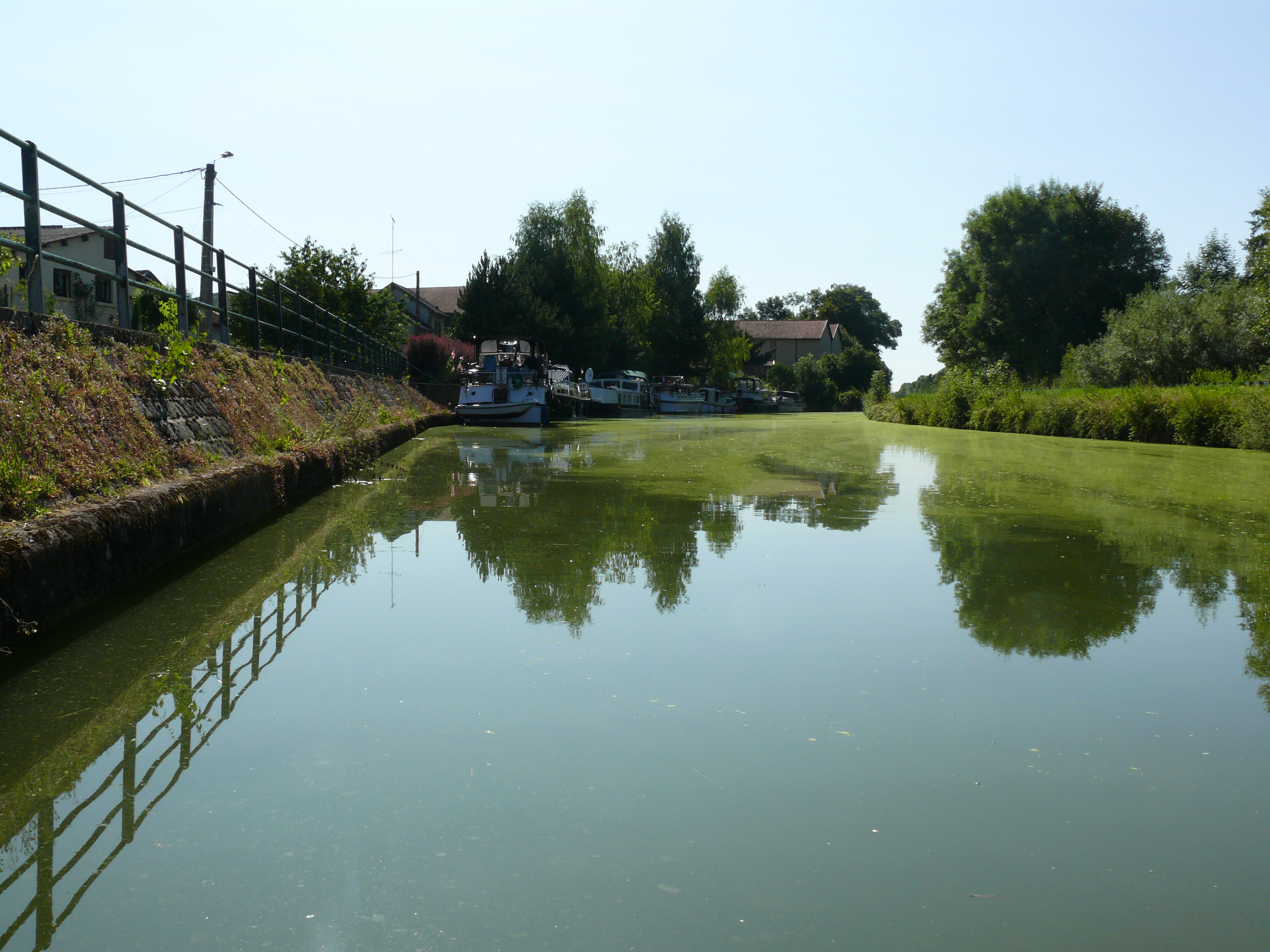
The Canal des Ardennes

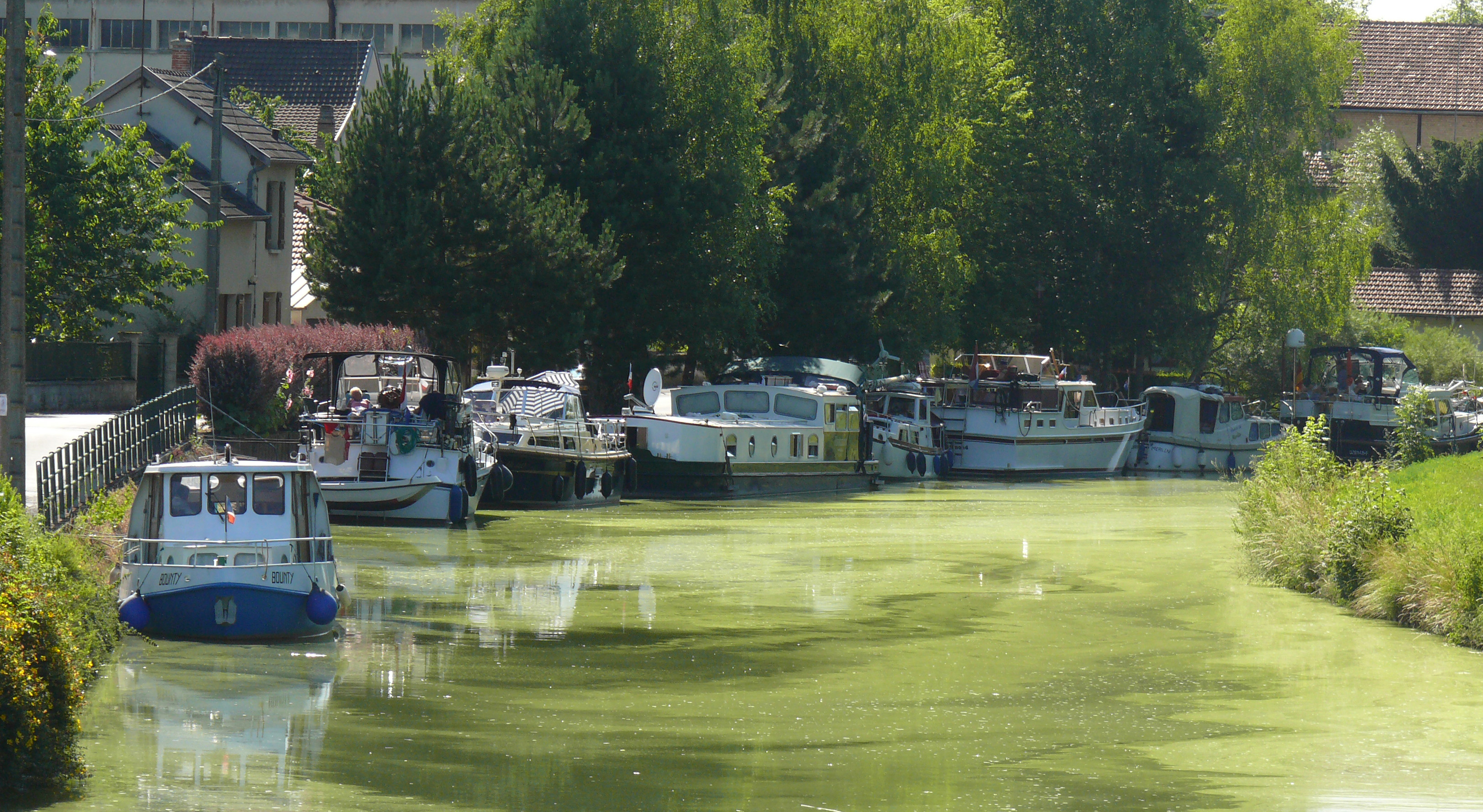
Port on the Canal

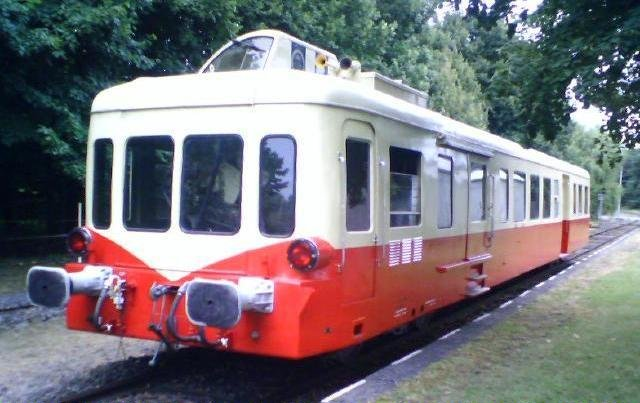
Autorail X3943 preserved at the station

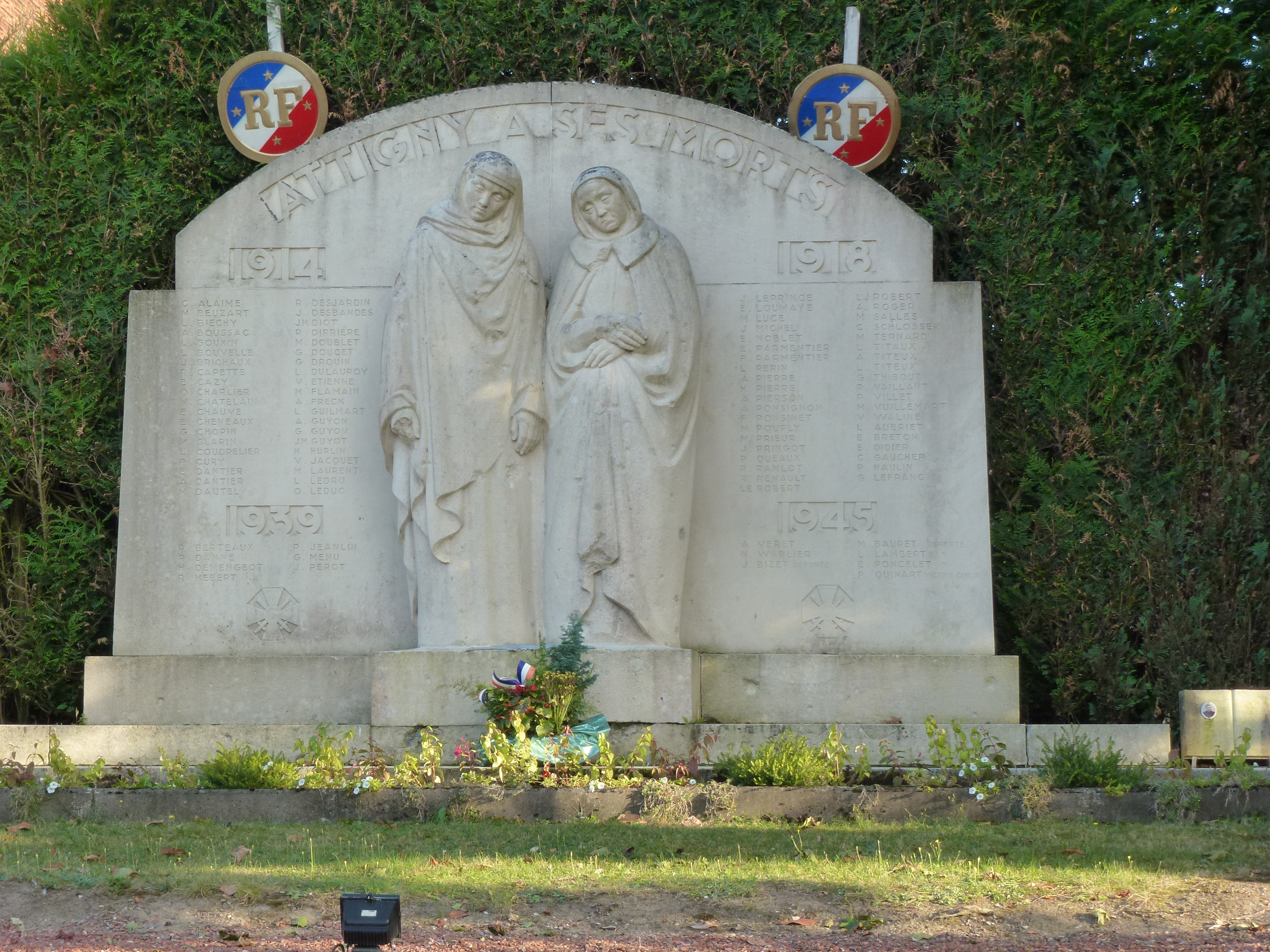
War memorial

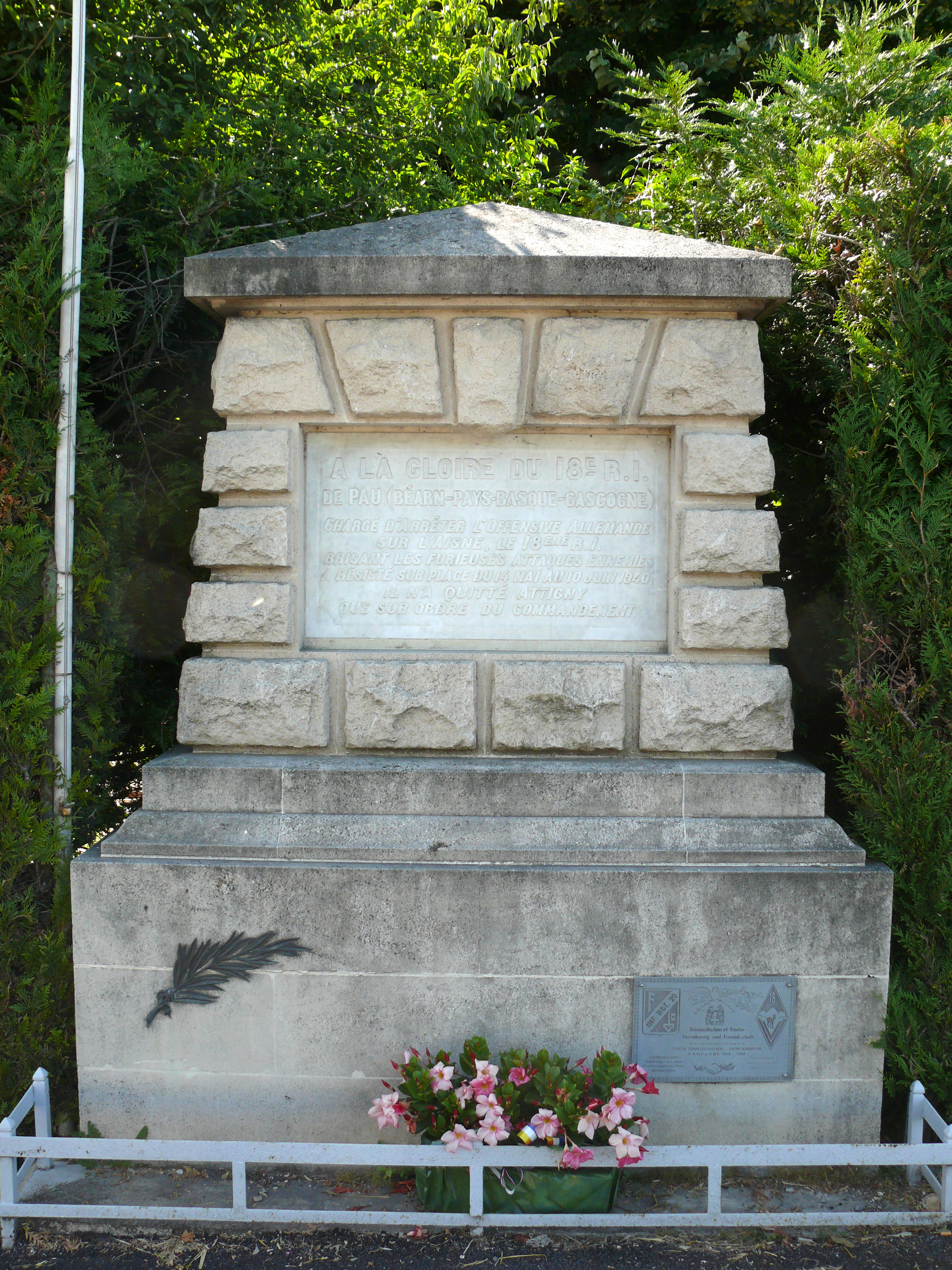
18th Regiment memorial

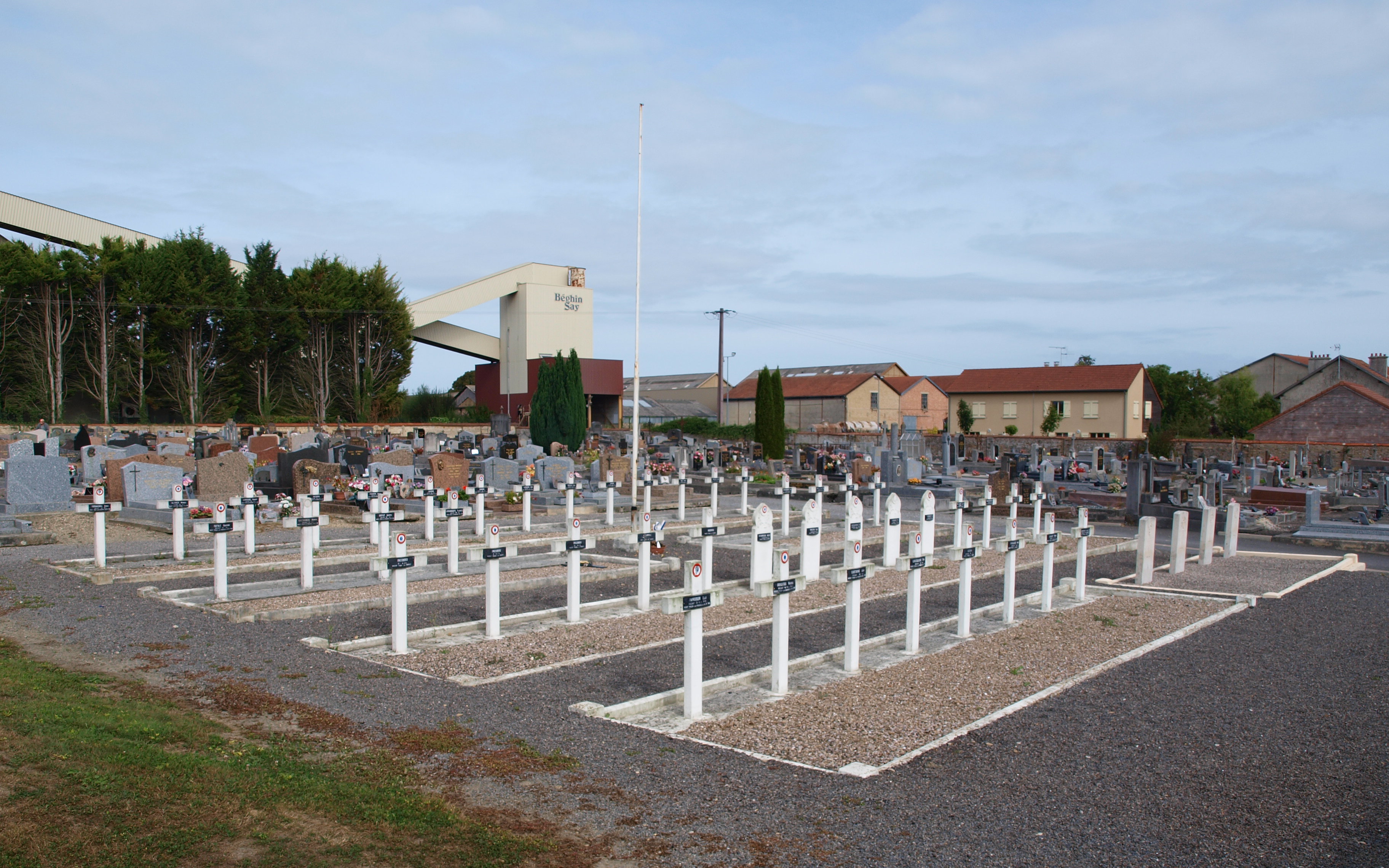
War cemetery

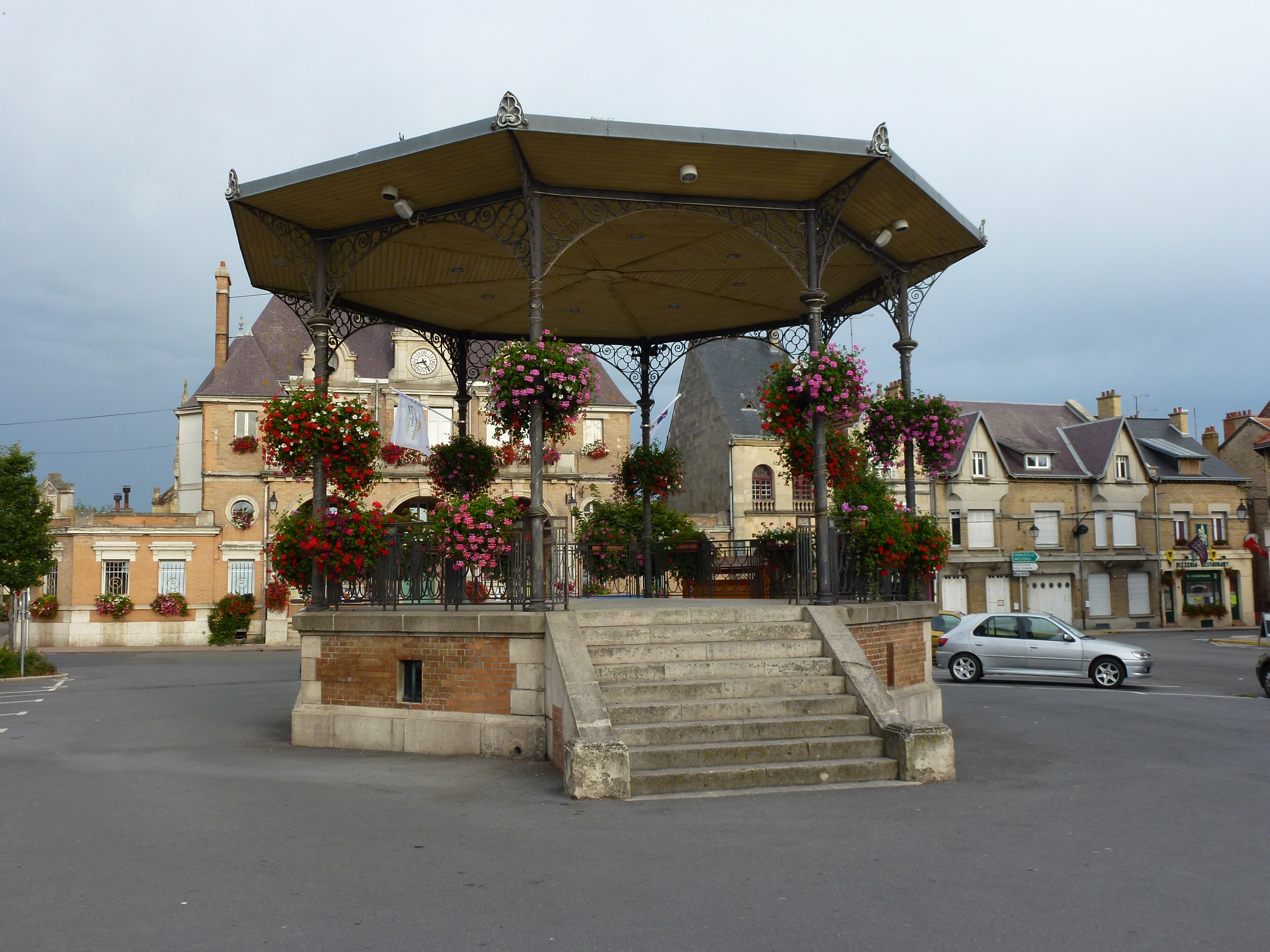
Bandstand

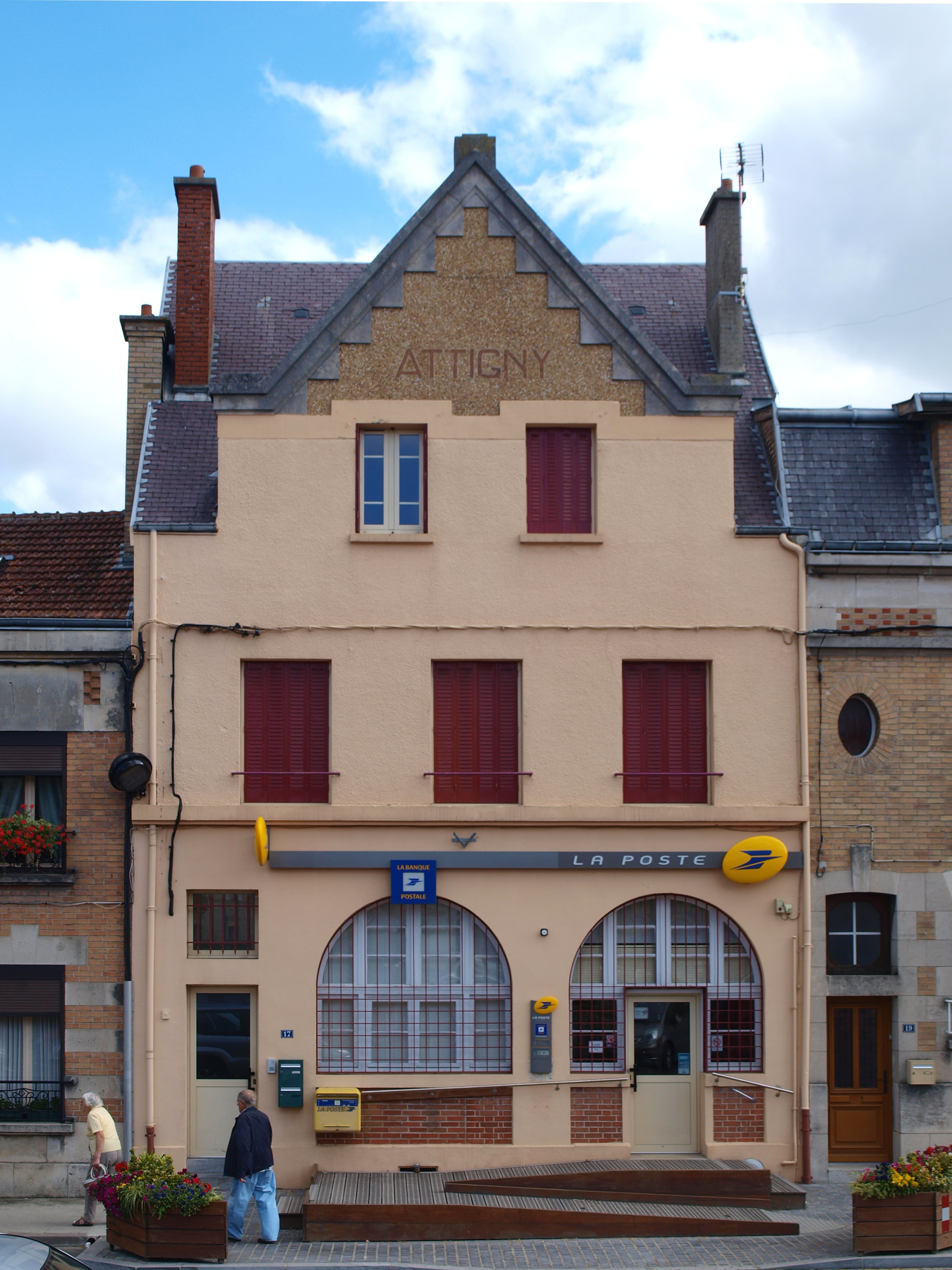
The Post Office

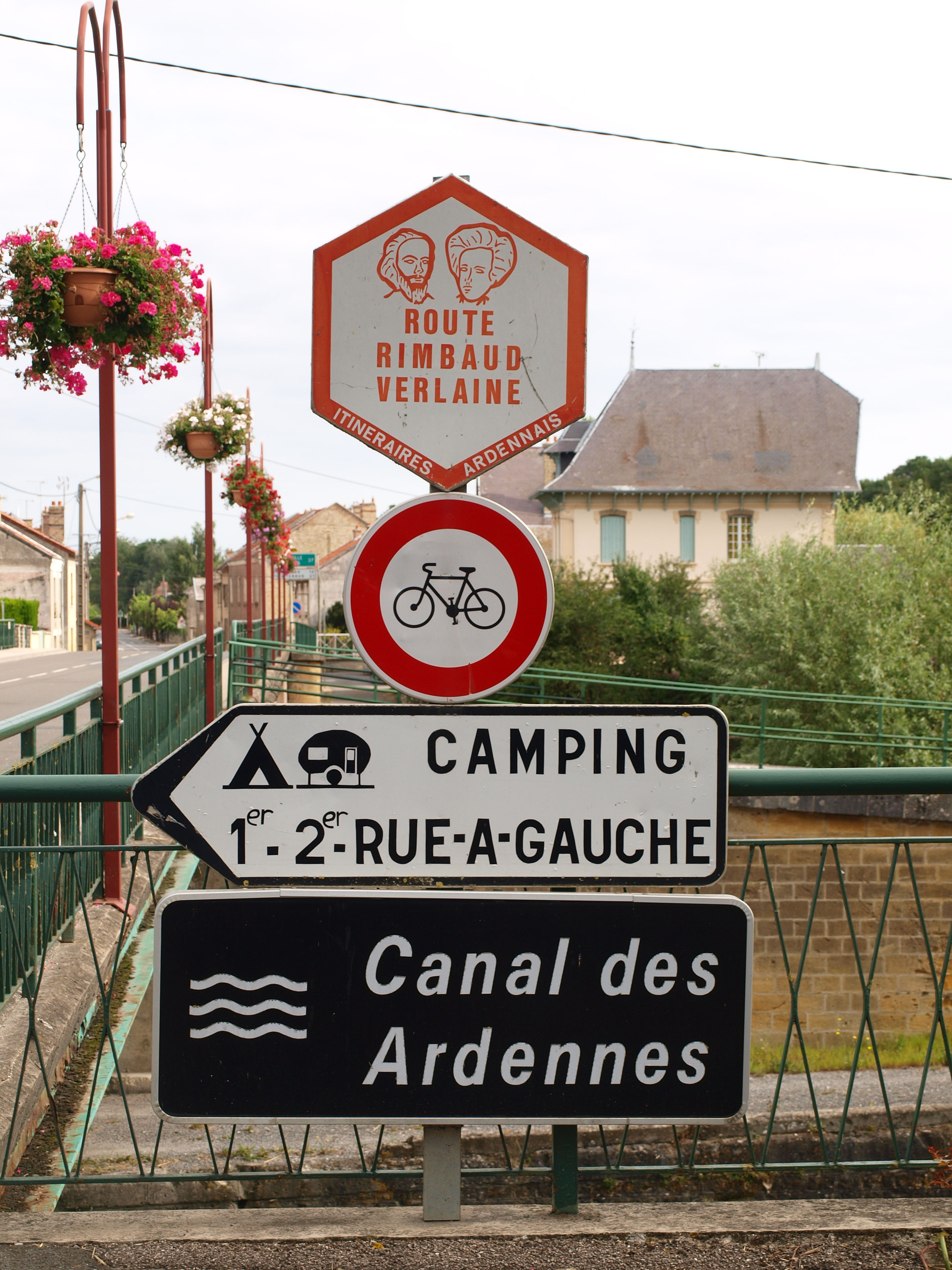
Signs in the town

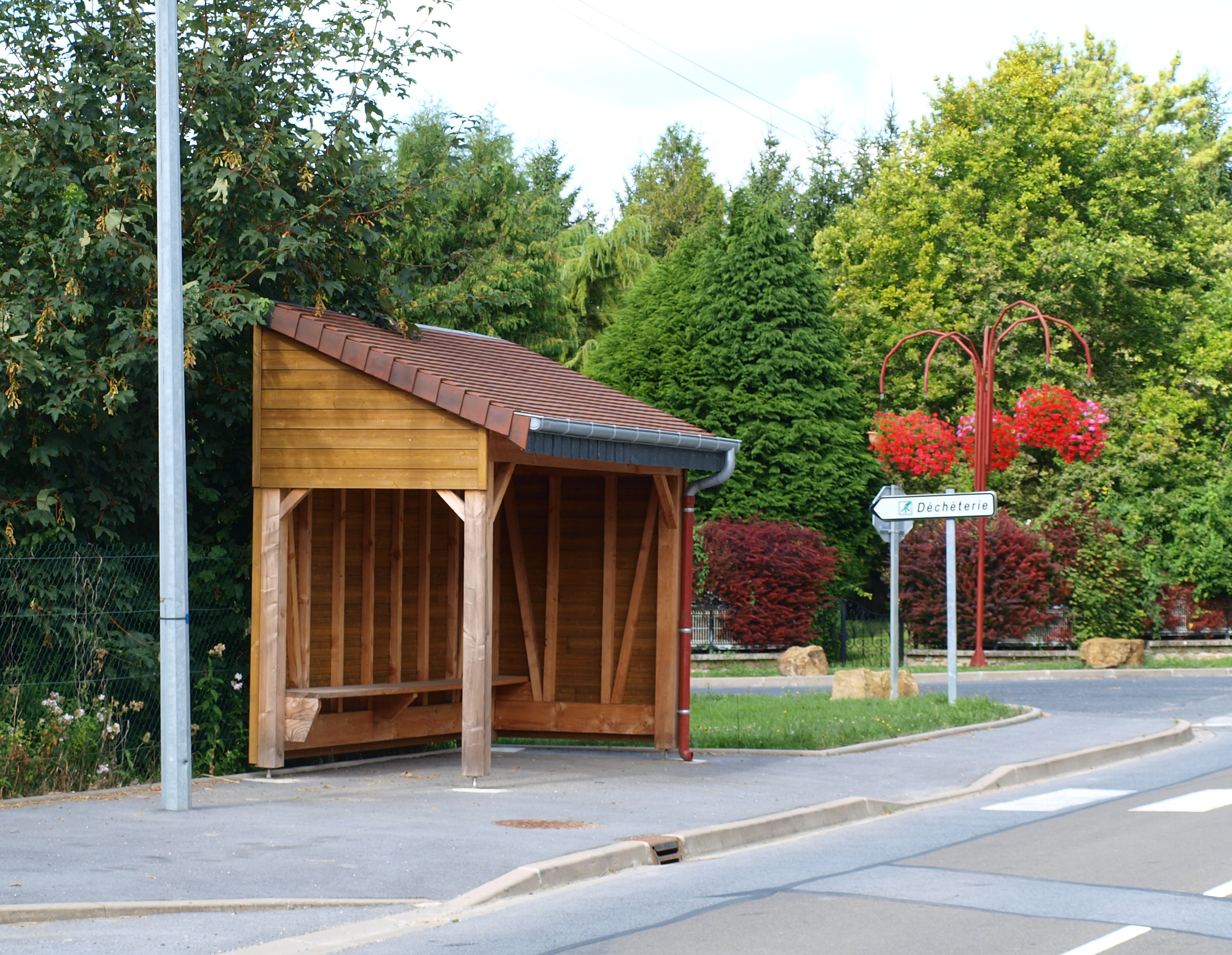
Bus stop

== Notable people linked to the commune ==
- Chilperic II (c. 672–721) King of the Franks, died in Attigny.
- Victor Noir (1848–1870) journalist, born in Attigny.
- André Dhôtel (1900–1991), writer, winner of the Prix Femina in 1955, born in Attigny.
- Camille Renault (1866–1954), sculptor, died in Attigny.

== Bibliography ==
- Guelliot, Octave (1997). "Attigny, Éditions Terres Ardennaises". Historical Dictionary of the arrondissement of Vouziers (in French). Vol. I. pp. 61–69. ISBN 2-905339-36-5.

== See also ==
- Communes of the Ardennes department
