= Wulfad =

Wulfad (died 876) was the archbishop of Bourges from 866 until his death. Prior to that, he was the abbot of Montier-en-Der (from 856) and Soissons (from 858). He also served as a tutor to Carloman, a younger son of King Charles the Bald. Carloman succeeded Wulfad as abbot of Soissons in 860.

Wulfad was ordained a priest by Archbishop Ebbo of Reims, who had been deposed in 835 and re-instated in 840. Wulfad was ordained during Ebbo's second incumbency, which ended in 841. He may have served the anti-king Pippin II of Aquitaine, an opponent of Charles the Bald, as a notary during 847–48, a period in which support for Pippin reached a high. In 857, Charles tried to promote him to the vacant see of Langres, but was successfully blocked by Ebbo's successor, Hincmar. In 859, Wulfad was removed from his priestly office, along with all the other priests, deacons and subdeacons ordained by Ebbo, at the synod of Savonnières, held under Hincmar's presidency.

Neither Wulfad's support for Pippin nor his defrocking by Hincmar deterred Charles the Bald from appointing him archbishop of Bourges in 866. He had probably supported the king during the Neustrian rebellions of 858–60, for in a charter of 859 Charles calls him "our dearest abbot and minister". Although Hincmar disputed Wulfad's eligibility for the episcopate, the synod held at Soissons in August 866 refused to adjudicate the case. In 868 Charles convinced Pope Nicholas I that Wulfad's "prudence and vigour" were needed to counter the Vikings that threatened the region around Bourges. The pope confirmed him in the see.

In Wulfad's day, all books were copied by hand, thus friends lent books to friends to allow them to copy them out for their own libraries. A list of books in Wulfad's library, probably intended to circulate among his friends, has survived on the back of a manuscript copy of the philosopher John Scotus Eriugena's Ambigua. Wulfad was a close associate of Eriugena, who dedicated to him his Periphyseon and called him a "collaborator in philosophical disputes". Wulfad's list of books includes titles by Eriugena, including the latter's translations of Pseudo-Dionysius and Maximus the Confessor's Ad Thalassium. There is a poem preserved in the manuscript F. 67 in the Leiden Universiteitsbibliothek that preserves a poem addressed to Wulfad by a monk suffering from the cold while his fellow monk, Wulfad's former student, Carloman, was by a warm fire.

== Sources ==
- Kenney, James Francis (1966). The Sources for the Early History of Ireland: Ecclesiastical. New York: Octagon Books.
- Lacger, Louis de (1937). "La primatie d'Aquitaine du VIII^{e} au XIV^{e} siècle". Revue d'histoire de l'Église de France. 23 (98): 29–50. doi:10.3406/rhef.1937.2791.
- McKitterick, Rosamond (1983). The Frankish Kingdoms under the Carolingians, 751–987. London: Longman.
- Nelson, J. L. (1986). "The Annals of St. Bertin". Politics and Ritual in Early Medieval Europe. [First published in Charles the Bald: Court and Kingdom, edited by M. Gibson and J. L. Nelson, BAR International Series, 101 (Oxford, 1981), pp. 15–36]. London: Hambledon Press. pp. 173–94.
- Nelson, J. L. (1992). Charles the Bald. London: Longman.
- Tavard, George H. (1973). "Episcopacy and Apostolic Succession According to Hincmar of Reims" (PDF). Theological Studies. 34 (4): 594–623. doi:10.1177/004056397303400403. S2CID 159964598.

Catholic Church titles
Preceded by Rodulf	Archbishop of Bourges; 866–876	Succeeded by Frothar
