= Immena =

Immena (also spelled Emena or Immenana) was a Frankish noblewoman, nun and abbess of the ninth century.

Immena is directly known from only three charters. She was the daughter of Count Rodulf and Aiga. In November 823, they dedicated her and her brother Rodulf to the religious life. In this ceremony, she would have been veiled in black or purple. She was given several properties to support her economically. The charter recording this act states that Immena was to live in a "congregation of nuns" on the lands donated by her parents. It is unlikely that she or her brother had any choice in the matter. The new nunnery was to be a proprietary church. The charter specified that a family member would exercise mundeburdium over it after Immena's death.

In February 844, Immena joined her family to donate a piece of land for the good of the soul of her recently deceased father. In the charter recording this transaction, she is given the title of abbess (abbatissa) and her congregation is said to be living according to a "rule for girls" (regular puellarum) at the villa of Sarrazac. It is probable that the elder Rodulf was buried at Sarrazac. The nuns' church, dedicated to Saint Genesius, was also located there.

The final reference to Immena is in a charter of 847, which records how she sold land worth 1,000 solidi to her brother. By 856, she was dead. The community of nuns did not long survive her, despite the intentions of her parents at its foundation. Between 856 and 860, her brother Rodulf, by then archbishop of Bourges, redistributed the lands and dissolved the community of nuns, replacing it with a community of monks at a new location, the monastery of Beaulieu. His reasons were probably economic and spiritual: male monastic houses attracted more patronage and revenue, in part because male clerics could celebrate Mass, making them more appealing spiritual intermediaries. Jane Martindale contrasts the careers of Immena and her brother to highlight the limited opportunities afforded to women in the ninth-century Frankish church.

== Sources ==
- Aubel, François (1997). "Les comtes de Quercy (fin VIII^{e}–début X^{e} siècle)". Annales du Midi. 109 (219–220): 309–335.
- Martindale, Jane (1990). "The Nun Immena and the Foundation of the Abbey of Beaulieu: A Woman's Prospects in the Carolingian Church". Studies in Church History. 27: 27–42. doi:10.1017/S0424208400011992.
