= Hincmar of Laon =

Hincmar, called the Younger, was the Bishop of Laon in the West Frankish Kingdom of Charles the Bald from 858 to 871. His career is remembered by a succession of quarrels with his monarch and his uncle, archbishop Hincmar of Rheims. After initial loyalty to Charles trouble occurred from 868 due to the allocation of benefices on the see's estates. The conflict grew dangerous as it became embroiled in the larger dispute of Lotharingian succession following Lothair II’s attempted divorce from his wife. Hincmar’s struggle against his king provides a Carolingian example of early Medieval clerical exemption.

== Early life ==
Hincmar was born near Boulogne sometime between 835 and 838. His mother died while he was young and thus he was moved to Rheims and brought up under the care of his maternal uncle. It appears that Hincmar was a child prodigy, mastering Latin grammar, elements of Greek and the work of the Church Fathers.

His appointment as Bishop of Laon in 858 was the work of his uncle. Due to Hincmar of Rheims’s close relationship with Charles the Bald he was able to ‘secure the appointment of the episcopal candidates he favoured, including that of his own nephew to the strategically key bishopric of Laon. As a bishop Hincmar of Laon held a retinue of thirty to forty men, he was not the only Carolingian bishop to have a retinue of laymen. In 858 Charles the Bald’s brother Louis the German invaded the Kingdom of West Francia. As a vassal to Charles, Hincmar provided Charles with ‘active military service.’ Hincmar evidently impressed his monarch by allowing Charles to raise troops from his episcopal see, as in 860 Charles returned much lost land to the church of Laon as a reward for this service.

== Conflict with Charles the Bald (868–869) ==
After a decade as bishop of Laon, Hincmar came into conflict with Charles the Bald. In 868 charges were brought against the bishop regarding benefices within his see. Two vassals alleged that Hincmar was treating them unjustly, and that Hincmar had seized their benefices without justification. Another vassal also claimed that Hincmar had taken without reason from him a benefice that had previously been held by father. Charles the Bald demanded that Hincmar defend himself before a panel of secular judges. Hincmar disputed this, requesting clerical exemption from the royal court, and turned to his uncle for support. Hincmar of Rheims was ‘always zealous to guard the rights of the church.’ As a result, Hincmar of Reims produced the Rotula in order to protect the right of his nephew to only be tried in an ecclesiastical court.

The Rotula was a reactionary piece defending episcopal privileges, centrally clerical exemption. In effect Hincmar of Rheims collected various sources which espoused the right for a cleric to be tried in a secular court or punish those who tried clerics at a secular court. For example, ‘that no one should dare to accuse a bishop before public judges’ from the ‘Roman Laws declared by Gratian, Valentinian and Theodoric’. These referral to older authorities of canon law increased the persuasiveness of the Rotula. Hincmar of Rheims also warned Charles that ‘it was not the place of a king to publicly recriminate against a bishop, to summon him before a secular court.’ Both Hincmars travelled to Pîtres to meet the king in August 868. It was evident here that Charles was angered by Hincmar of Laon's actions and thus Hincmar of Reims watered down his defence of his nephew. Charles had previous experience of dealing with unruly bishops. Thirty years earlier at the trial of Bishop Samuel of Toulouse he stated that he;

‘would not suffer bishops to be examined outside of the royal and lay jurisdiction in matters pertaining to regalian rights and to the laws of the kingdom.’

Because of Hincmar of Reims's support for his nephew Charles ordered that the question would be handled by a synod. Hincmar of Laon then turned his attention over the Alps for support in preparation for his next conflict with the king. The bishop of Laon sent secret messengers to Pope Hadrian II regarding a disputed villa at Poilly, which Hincmar claimed belonged to Laon.

At Quierzy in December 868 Hincmar produced the papal responses to the king which chided the king. Hadrian also commanded that the villa of Poilly was to be returned to Hincmar. Following this Charles's attempts to forcefully bring Hincmar into line were unsuccessful, partly due to the continued support of Hincmar of Rheims.

Before attending the council of Verberie in April 869 Hincmar of Laon set up precautions in his see in case the council was a trap. While Charles did attempt to accuse Hincmar here he was halted by Hincmar of Rheims who again reiterated the principles detailed in the Rotula and presented at Pîtres the year before. Hincmar of Laon still enjoyed his uncle's support. In this case, however, Hincmar of Rheims's concern was now for the church and for canon law rather than for his nephew. Again Hincmar of Laon turned to Pope Hadrian for support. He claimed that Charles was ‘no more than a tyrant, an oppressor of the church and an invader of her property.’ Furthermore, he also accused his uncle of failing in his duty to protect the church and his nephew.

On May 27, 869, Charles imprisoned Hincmar of Laon. As a result, Hincmar put into action his plan prepared before Verberie a month prior. Thus, all holy offices in the diocese of Laon were prohibited. This only achieved in angering both Charles and Hincmar of Rheims. His uncle thus supported his imprisonment and wrote to Hincmar to raise this interdict.

A month later, on June 24 at another annual assembly at Pîtres Hincmar had yielded to the king. This occurred without his uncle's knowledge. This reconciliation with Charles was due to private agreement. Hincmar swore an oath of allegiance to the king in return for the disputed villa of Poilly's return to the see of Laon.

Throughout this conflict it appears that Charles's response to Hincmar is somewhat overbearing. But alongside Hincmar's threats to involve the papacy he also threatened to switch allegiance to King Lothar II. This interfered with the key issue of diplomacy and politics in the realm. Indeed, in 868 following the death of Pope Nicholas I – Hadrian's predecessor – Lothar had tried to secure his position against his uncles; Charles the Bald and Louis the German. Thus, Lothar tried to enlist Hincmar of Laon, due to the bishop's current dispute with Charles. Lothar's attempted divorce from Theutberga was a key political issue as it potentially left him without an heir, thus providing an easy opportunity for Charles and Louis to seize the kingdom of Lotharingia. Therefore, threats to desert to Lothar were serious. Evidently Charles believed Hincmar was sincere in this as the monarch accused Hincmar of ‘conspiring with Lothar II to desert his own king.’

== Downfall (870–873) ==
On June 16, 870, Hincmar of Laon was called to the Synod of Attigny where Charles instructed Hincmar to renew his oath to his uncle. Hincmar was reluctant but eventually the pressure of the king and the archbishop was successful. At Attigny more accusations of a similar ilk to 868 were brought against Hincmar. Two days later, on June 18^{th,} there was a royal tribunal. Two of Hincmar's men – Ragenardus and Grivo – accused him of expropriation. In his defence Hincmar asserted that the witnesses who knew the truth of what happened were not present, yet Charles forced him to answer. As a result, Hincmar accused both Ragenardus and Grivo of wrongdoing yet he was unable to substantiate these claims or back them up under oath. Fearing imprisonment, Hincmar fled back to Laon. This fear was not without basis, yet was an irrational and self-destructive move.

Following the death of Lothar II in August 869 there is evidence linking Hincmar to the conspiracy of Carloman. Carloman was son of Charles the Bald who from an early age was excluded from inheriting his father's crown. Following Lothar's death, he was able to gather an aristocratic following in Lotharingia and vie in a grab for power around 870.

Both Peter McKeon and Janet Nelson subscribe to the view that Hincmar was sympathetic to Carloman. The timings of Hincmar's renewed oaths, the backing of the pope to both Hincmar and Carloman, and both men's connections to Lotharingia offer a ‘tantalising persistent thread.’ While Nelson admits that none of the charges against Hincmar mention complicity with Carloman the timings of events ‘seem more than a coincidence.’ Only two days after Hincmar swore allegiance at Attingy (June 16) Carloman was arrested by Charles (June 18) and taken to the stronghold of Senlis.

In 871 Hincmar of Rheims drew up a Synodal document to excommunicate Carloman and cease his grab for power. Hincmar of Laon's refusal to endorse this document proved to be a desperate and final act of defiance.

‘Already embroiled in major disputes with both his uncle and Charles the Bald, and already suspected of conspiring with Lothar II, Hincmar of Laon now brought down on himself the full extent of the king’s wrath.’

In August 871 Hincmar was seized by royal agents at taken to Douzy where he appeared before an ecclesiastical court. Charles summoned eight archbishops and twenty-two bishops to preside over the Synod of Douzy. At Douzy Hincmar was deposed from episcopal and priestly rank. Pope Hadrian II attempted to intervene but Charles the Bald was successful in defending royal rights within his realm, and following his death in 872 the most powerful dissenting voice to the deposition of Hincmar was removed.

Carloman was retried and blinded in 873, permanently ending his attempts to be king. Later in the year Hincmar of Laon was also blinded, by order of Count Boso. Nelson states that by doing this, Charles the Bald ‘took vengeance for what he clearly believed was continued complicity with Carloman.’

Despite the decision reached at the Synod of Douzy it was not until 876, and with the permission of Pope John VIII that Archbishop Hincmar ordained his nephew's successor, Hedenulf, to the see of Laon.

== Final years ==
Charles the Bald died in October 877 and following the passing of Hincmar's antagonist he enjoyed some recompense. At the Council of Troyes in 878 Pope John VIII restored Hincmar to the performance of priestly offices. He was also allowed part of the revenues of his former see.

It was in these circumstances that Hincmar died in 881.
