= Carloman, son of Charles the Bald =

Frankish claimant (848–c. 877)

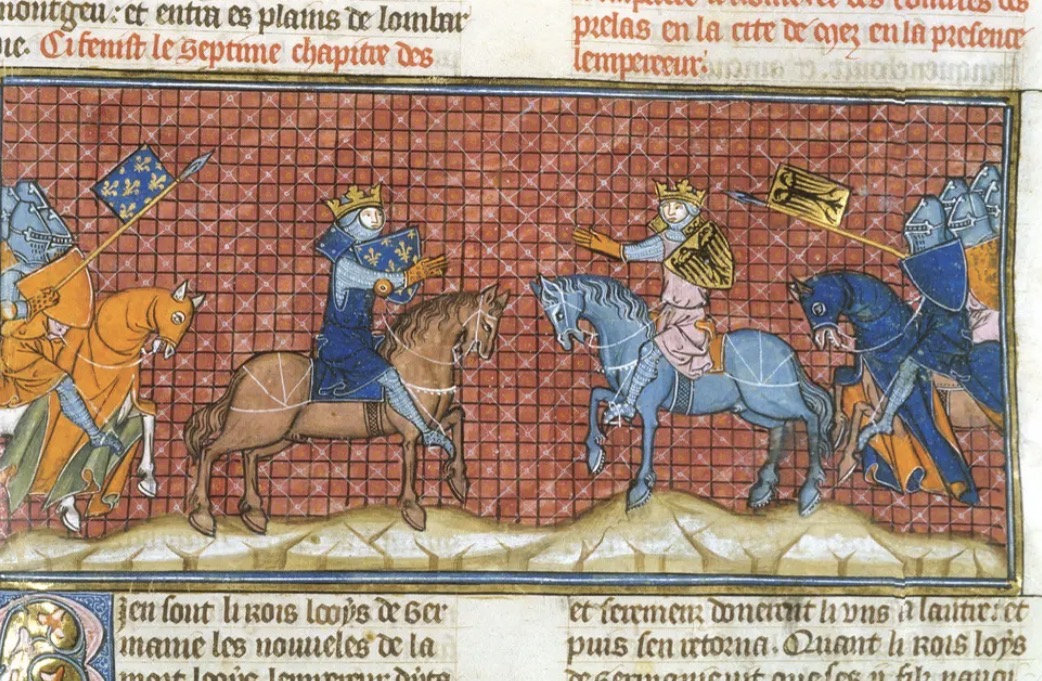
Detail of a miniature of Carloman making terms with his father, from folio 229 of the illuminated manuscript Royal MS 16 G VI in the British Library, a copy of the Grandes Chroniques de France

Carloman (848–c. 877) was the youngest son of Charles the Bald, king of West Francia, and his first wife, Ermentrude. He was intended for an ecclesiastical career from an early age, but in 870 rebelled against his father and tried to claim a part of the kingdom as an inheritance.

Born in 848, Carloman was tonsured as a child in 854 in furtherance of his father's policy of preventing a partition of the kingdom (as had happened at Verdun in 843) by placing his younger sons in the church. Carloman was tutored by Abbot Wulfad, a future archbishop. In 860 Carloman was ordained a deacon and acquired the abbacy of Saint-Médard de Soissons. In the following decade he acquired the abbacies of Saint-Amand d'Elnon, Saint-Riquier, Lobbes and Saint-Arnould de Metz.

In 865 Carloman's older brother and fellow ecclesiastic, Lothair the Lame, died and Carloman succeeded him in the abbey of Saint-Germain d'Auxerre. The next year (866), another brother, Charles the Child, whom Charles the Bald had made King of Aquitaine, died. With these deaths, Carloman became second in line to the throne after the eldest brother, Louis the Stammerer. By 870 he had gathered an aristocratic following. No specific names of supporters have come down to us, although they appear to have been mostly from Lotharingia and Flanders. Before his defiance of his father amounted to anything, he was arrested, tried and imprisoned at Senlis. His abbacies were forfeited as a consequence.

Pope Hadrian II unsuccessfully intervened, to try to secure Carloman's release, but escaping to Flanders, Carloman gathered a small army. The bishops of the province of Reims then met in early 871, under the leadership of Archbishop Hincmar at Compiègne. They pronounced excommunication on all of Carloman's supporters in the province of Reims, with one dissenting voice—Bishop Hincmar of Laon, who was perhaps a supporter of Carloman himself. In 873, Carloman was re-tried and blinded, but avoided imprisonment by escaping to East Francia, where his uncle, King Louis the German, gave him protection. He died there about 877.

== Sources ==
- McKitterick, Rosamond (1983). The Frankish Kingdoms under the Carolingians, 751–987. London: Longman. ISBN 978-0-582-49005-5.
