= Frothar (archbishop of Bordeaux) =

9th-century French bishop

Frothar or Frotar (Latin Frotharius, French Frotaire) was an Aquitanian prelate in West Francia, who held two different bishoprics and three abbacies during a long career. He was appointed Archbishop of Bordeaux around 859, but Viking raids forced him to abandon his seat in 870. With papal approval, he was transferred to the Archdiocese of Bourges in 876. He died after 893.

Frothar was related to the Counts of Toulouse and Rouergue, and perhaps to his predecessor at Bourges, Rodulf. By maintaining control of the abbeys of Brioude and Beaulieu, he preserved his family's influence in southern Gaul during the ascendancy of the Marquis Bernard Plantapilosa. Brioude had been under the protection of the Counts of Auvergne until 874, when Frothar possessed it. King Charles the Bald granted it permission to elect its own abbot and the monks chose Frothar, who was abbot as late as 893. After Frothar's death, the abbey reverted to the control of Duke William I of Aquitaine. Frothar was also the abbot of Saint-Hilaire-de-Poitiers from 868 and of Charroux in Provence from about the same time.

Frothar was archbishop at Bordeaux by late 860, when Archbishop Hincmar of Reims directed an epistolary treatise at him and Rodulf of Bourges. In the treatise, Hincmar suggested that the marriage of a certain Count Stephen to a daughter of Count Raymond of Toulouse could be annulled on the grounds that the couple had not consummated it. Rodulf and Frothar seem to have successfully negotiated the annulment and preserved peace between the two powerful Aquitanian families of Stephen and Raymond. This was especially important because Aquitaine had recently been re-constituted as a subkingdom for the king's son, Charles the Younger. Hincmar later opposed Frothar's transfer to Bourges at the synod of Ponthion (20 June–16 July 876).

Frothar was active in preserving church lands. He returned lands his family stole from Beaulieu in the Limousin and forced his relatives to confirm a charter of 887 restoring those lands to Beaulieu. He also intervened with King Carloman II to have land in Fréjus in Provence taken from the abbey of Saint-Victor de Marseille returned to it.

== Sources ==
- Lewis, A. R. (1965). The Development of Southern French and Catalan Society, 718–1050. Austin: University of Texas Press.
- Nelson, J. L. (1992). Charles the Bald. London: Longman.

Preceded by Adelelm	Archbishop of Bordeaux; 860–876	Succeeded by Adelbert
Preceded by Rodulf	Archbishop of Bourges; 876–c.893	Succeeded by Hugh
