= Rodulf (archbishop of Bourges) =

French Catholic archbishop

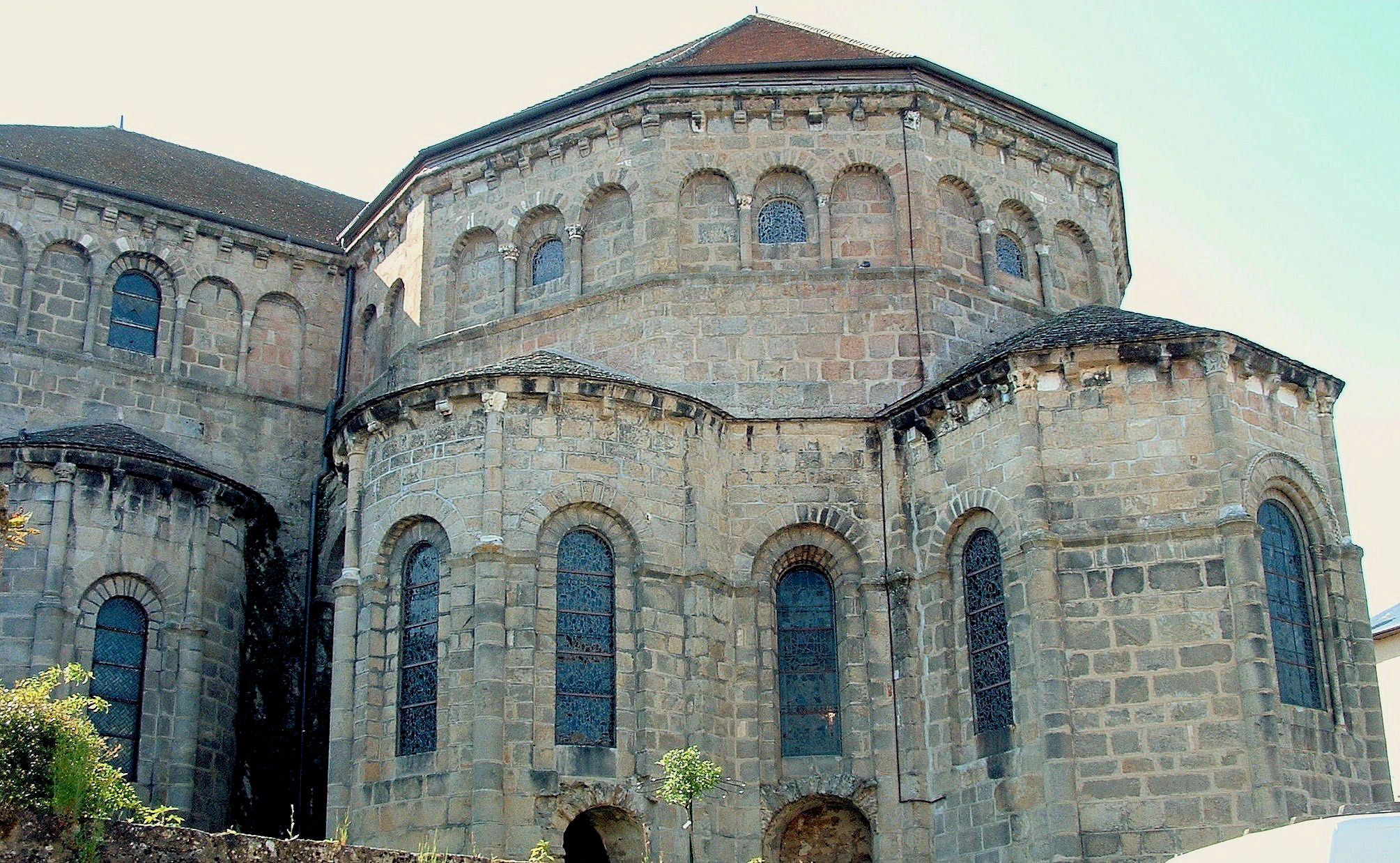
The monastery of Solignac, where Rodulf began his ecclesiastical career.

Rodulf (French: Saint Raoul; (Note: His name is also rendered Ralph, Radulph, Radulf or Rudolf.) died 21 June 866) was the archbishop of Bourges from 840 until his death. He is remembered as a skillful diplomat and a proponent of ecclesiastical reform. As a saint, his feast has been celebrated on 21 June.

== Aquitainian nobleman and monk ==
Rodulf's family was prominent in the region of Angoumois and he himself possessed lands in the Limousin. He was named after his father, the count of Turenne (died 844), and he had four brothers and two sisters as well as an unnamed sibling. He entered the monastery of Solignac as a novice in 823.

During the conflict between King Pippin II of Aquitaine and King Charles of West Francia over the inheritance of the Aquitanian kingdom, Rodulf maintained good relations with both claimants, although it is probable that his father fought in the war and is possible that Rodulf himself did as well. Contemporary documents describe him as a "faithful follower" (fidelis) of King Pippin. In late 840 Rodulf was elected as archbishop of Bourges, Since Pippin led an expedition north against Charles' forces in Poitou in September, it generally thought that he was the driving force behind the election of Rodulf and that he successfully extended his authority into the Berri (the region around Bourges), which was as far north as it would ever go. (Note: Charles was personally in control of Bourges in July 840 and January 841, so Pippin's success, if it took place, was short-lived.) One of Pippin's two surviving royal charters is a confirmation to the new archbishop. Yet if the appointment of Rodulf was political on the one hand, the capitulation (capitula) which he signed upon his election "shows that [he] was in the vanguard of the Carolingian reform movement." Shortly after becoming archbishop, Rodulf bought a large piece of land from a certain Boso for 1,500 solidi.

== West Frankish diplomat ==
By early May 844, Rodulf had recognised Charles as king in Aquitaine. In that month he visited Charles while the latter was besieging Toulouse and received a charter from him at Charles's headquarters in the monastery of Saint-Sernin. Rodulf attended the council of Ver in December that year. According to the Translatio sancti Germani, Rodulf and Bishop Ebroin of Poitiers played the leading rôles in the negotiations to reconcile Charles and Pippin in the winter of 844–45. Rodulf hosted a conference at the monastery of Fleury in June 845, where Pippin swore fealty to Charles and Charles gave Pippin lordship over most of Aquitaine (the regions of Poitou, Saintonge and Aunis excepted). Later that same month, Rodulf attended the great synod at Meaux with archbishops Wenilo of Sens and Hincmar of Reims. As a reward for his work, Charles granted Rodulf control over Fleury's resources in October 846.

In August or September 849, after Pippin had rebelled against Charles, Rodulf, "with the greatest enthusiasm", (Note: The phrase is from a charter Charles issued on the occasion.) hosted a royal assembly before the king moved south to besiege Toulouse a second time. According to the Annales Fontanellenses, Charles then spent Christmas in Bourges and stayed into January 850. Rodulf may have served as guardian (bajulus) to Charles's son, Charles the Child, when the latter was made king of Aquitaine in 855. Late in 860, Hincmar of Reims wrote a letter to Rodulf and Archbishop Frothar of Bordeaux—who may have been a kinsman of Rodulf's—outlining the difficulties of Count Stephen, son of Count Hugh of Tours, who was trying to repudiate his wife, the daughter of Count Raymond I of Toulouse. Rodulf and Frothar were successful in negotiating a settlement. The scale of the disorders may be gauged by two charters of Rodulf's from 859 and 860, in which he laments "the presence of evil men" (infestorum malorum hominum) in his diocese, an indication of violence and civil strife. In 860 Rodulf drew up a will and had it confirmed by Raymond of Toulouse.

== Church reformer ==
With Bishop Stodilo of Limoges, Rodulf helped found the monastery of Beaulieu. His family provided the land for the foundation, and he himself consecrated the new community under the Benedictine rule in 860. He granted the monks the right of free election of their abbot, and pronounced excommunication on any governing authority who molested them in the future. He even procured royal protection (mundeburdium) for them. Rodulf's brother Gottfried, the count of Turenne, along with Raymond of Toulouse and Aldo, abbot of Saint Martial's, were witnesses to this act of consecration. In 859, Stodilo granted a church to Rodulf and Abbot Garnulf of Beaulieu as a precarium in return for an annual rent of seven solidi. Rodulf also helped found the convent at Cahors where his sister Immena was installed as the first abbess.

The earliest reference to the archbishop of Bourges as primate of Aquitaine dates from the episcopate of Rodulf. (Note: The poet Theodulf of Orléans uses similar terminology in praising Rodulf's predecessor, Aiulf.) In 864, when Archbishop Sigebod of Narbonne complained to Pope Nicholas I that Rodulf had called some clergy of Narbonne before him "as if by patriarchal right" (quasi jure patriarchatus), the pope confirmed the right of clergy to appeal to Bourges if all avenues in Narbonne had been exhausted and of the suffragans of Narbonne to appeal to Bourges "as if to their patriarch" (quasi ad patriarchum suum). (Note: This papal letter was cited by Ivo of Chartres two centuries later against the primatial claims of the archdiocese of Lyon. Its authenticity has been questioned by Georges Pariset, Émile Lesne and Augustin Fliche, but defended by Beitscher, Lacger and by Christian Pfister.) In his acts Rodulf sometimes titled himself "primate" (primas) and "bishop of the primatial see" (primae sedis episcopus).

Rofuld died at Bourges on 21 June 866 and was buried in the basilica of Saint Ursinus. He was succeeded by a cleric from the royal palace of Charles the Bald named Wulfad. Into the twelfth century, the community of Beaulieu commemorated Rodulf as "our master of holy memory". A rather standard hagiography of Rodulf, the Vita sancti Rodulfi, survives.

Preceded by Agilulf	Archbishop of Bourges; 840–866	Succeeded by Wulfad
