= Archibald Ross Lewis =

American historian (1914–1990)

- Born: August 25, 1914; Bronxville, New York, U.S.
- Died: February 4, 1990 (aged 75)
- Education: Princeton University
- Occupations: Historian; professor; author

Archibald Ross Lewis (August 25, 1914 – February 4, 1990) was an American historian, World War II Veteran, professor, and author. He wrote 14 books, and more than 100 articles. As a professor he taught at the University of South Carolina, University of Texas, and University of Massachusetts, in that order.

== Biography ==
=== Early life and military service ===
Archibald Ross Lewis was born on August 25, 1914, in Bronxville, New York. He enrolled at Princeton, where he earned his bachelor's degree (1936), Master's Degree (1939), and Doctoral Degree (1940). Lewis served for 5 years in World War Two, working in field artillery. He retired as a lieutenant colonel. During the War he was awarded a Croix de Guerre, a bronze star, and five battle stars. Most of what we know about his military service comes from his book, War in The West, which he wrote shortly before he died of a heart attack in 1990. The book itself was not published until 1992.

=== Time as a professor ===
Lewis first served at the University of South Carolina. Afterwards he was a professor at the University of Texas for 16 years, and then the University of Massachusetts for another 16 years.

== Works ==
- Nomads and Crusaders, A.D. 1000–1368
- European Naval and Maritime History, 300–1500
- Development of Southern French and Catalan Society, 718–1050
- Emerging Medieval Europe, A.D. 400–1000
- Knights and Samurai
- Aspects of the Renaissance
