= 2nd Special Operations Squadron =

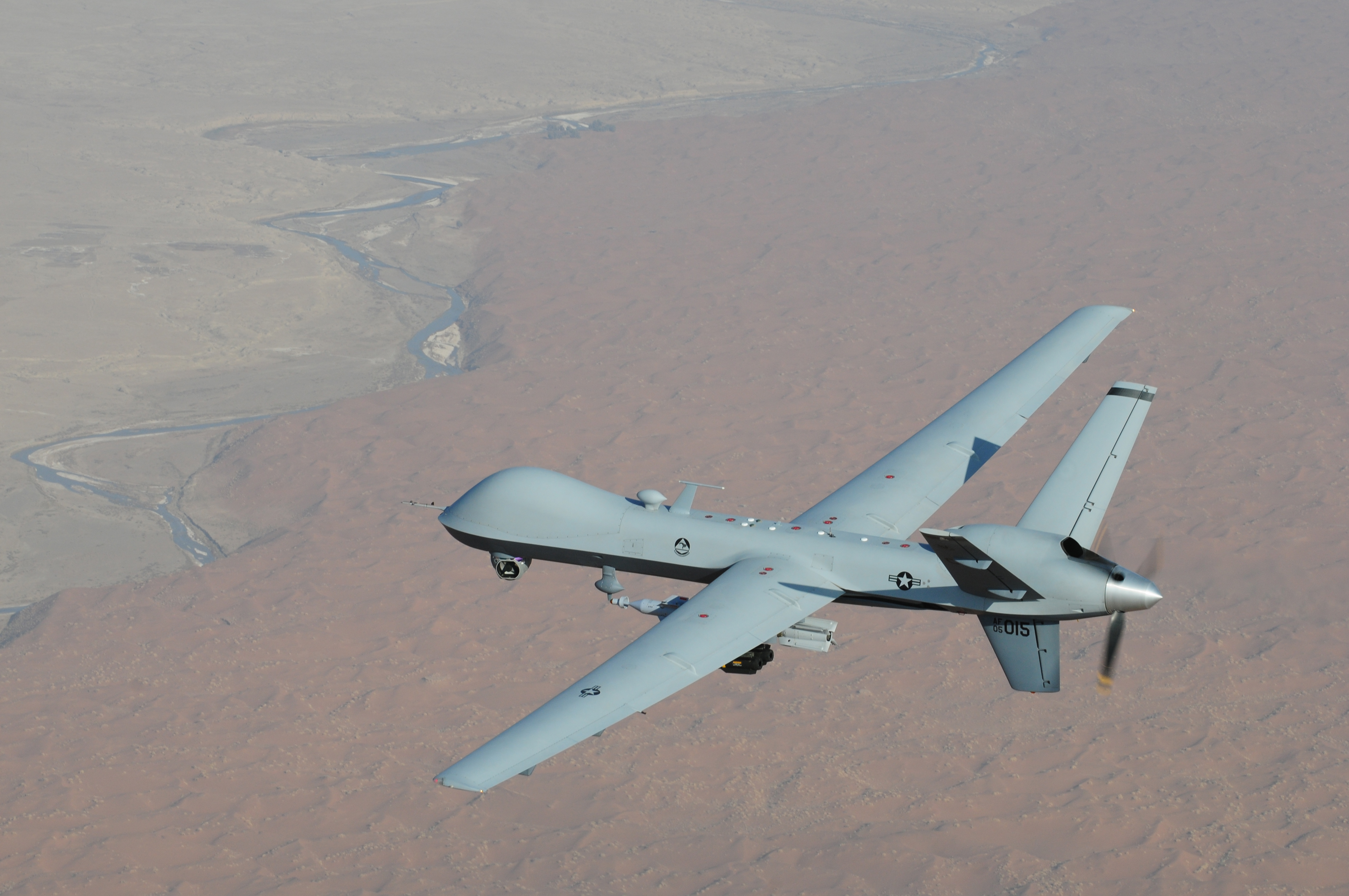
- U.S. Air Force MQ-9A Reaper armed with a Paveway and 2 AGM-114 Hellfire missiles
- Active: 1917–1922; 1930–1942; 1949–1961; 2009–present
- Country: United States
- Branch: United States Air Force
- Role: Special Operations
- Part of: Air Force Reserve Command
- Garrison/HQ: Hurlburt Field, Florida
- Nickname(s): 2 SOS
- Engagements: World War I: Toul sector; Aisne-Mame offensive; Champagne-Marne offensive; Meuse-Argonne offensive; St. Mihiel offensive; Occupation of the Rhineland

Insignia
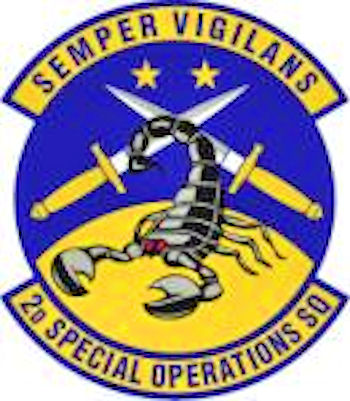
- Emblem of the 2nd Special Operations Squadron

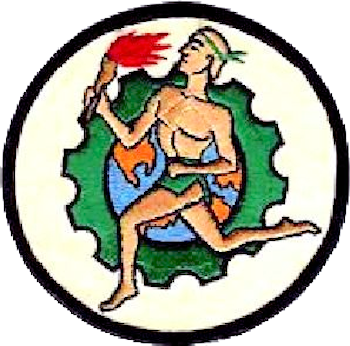
- Patch with 2nd Strategic Support Squadron emblem (approved 26 February 1951)

The 2nd Special Operations Squadron is an Air Force Reserve Command unit, assigned to the 919th Special Operations Wing. Stationed at Hurlburt Field, Florida, the unit operates General Atomics MQ-9 Reaper remotely piloted vehicles.

The unit is one of the oldest units in the United States Air Force, being formed on 25 September 1917 at Fort Omaha, Nebraska. During World War I, the unit was part of the Balloon Section, American Expeditionary Forces, becoming the first American balloon company to reach the Western Front in France and enter combat. The 2nd thus holds the distinction among all USAF units of being "the first complete American air unit in history to operate against an enemy on foreign soil."

It was part of the Army Balloon School after the war, being a balloon training unit until the beginning of World War II. It was later part of the Strategic Air Command during the Cold War.

== History ==
=== World War I ===
The unit was initially formed at Fort Omaha, Nebraska as Company B, 2nd Balloon Squadron on 25 September 1917 at the Fort Omaha Balloon School. Its mission was to provide forward observations for the artillery. The unit trained in the fall of 1917, one of the last, as training was rather difficult at Fort Omaha: the weather was bad much of the time, and it was impossible to keep balloons in the air for long periods. The Army decided they needed Balloon Schools in warmer, more stable, environments and selected Camp John Wise in San Antonio, Texas and Camp Ross, Arcadia, California. On 30 November, orders were received for the unit to proceed to the Aviation Concentration Center, Garden City, Long Island, for preparation to serve overseas.

On 7 December, the squadron, now designated the 2nd Balloon Company, boarded a train and proceeded to Saint John, New Brunswick, Newfoundland where it boarded the RMS Tunisian for the crossing of the Atlantic. It left on 12 December and arrived at Liverpool, England on Christmas Day. From there, the company traveled by train to Southampton on the English Channel coast and boarded the steamer Archangel for Le Havre, France, arriving on 28 December. It reported to the American Expeditionary Force Balloon School at Camp de Coetquidan, Morbihan, France, on 3 January 1918.

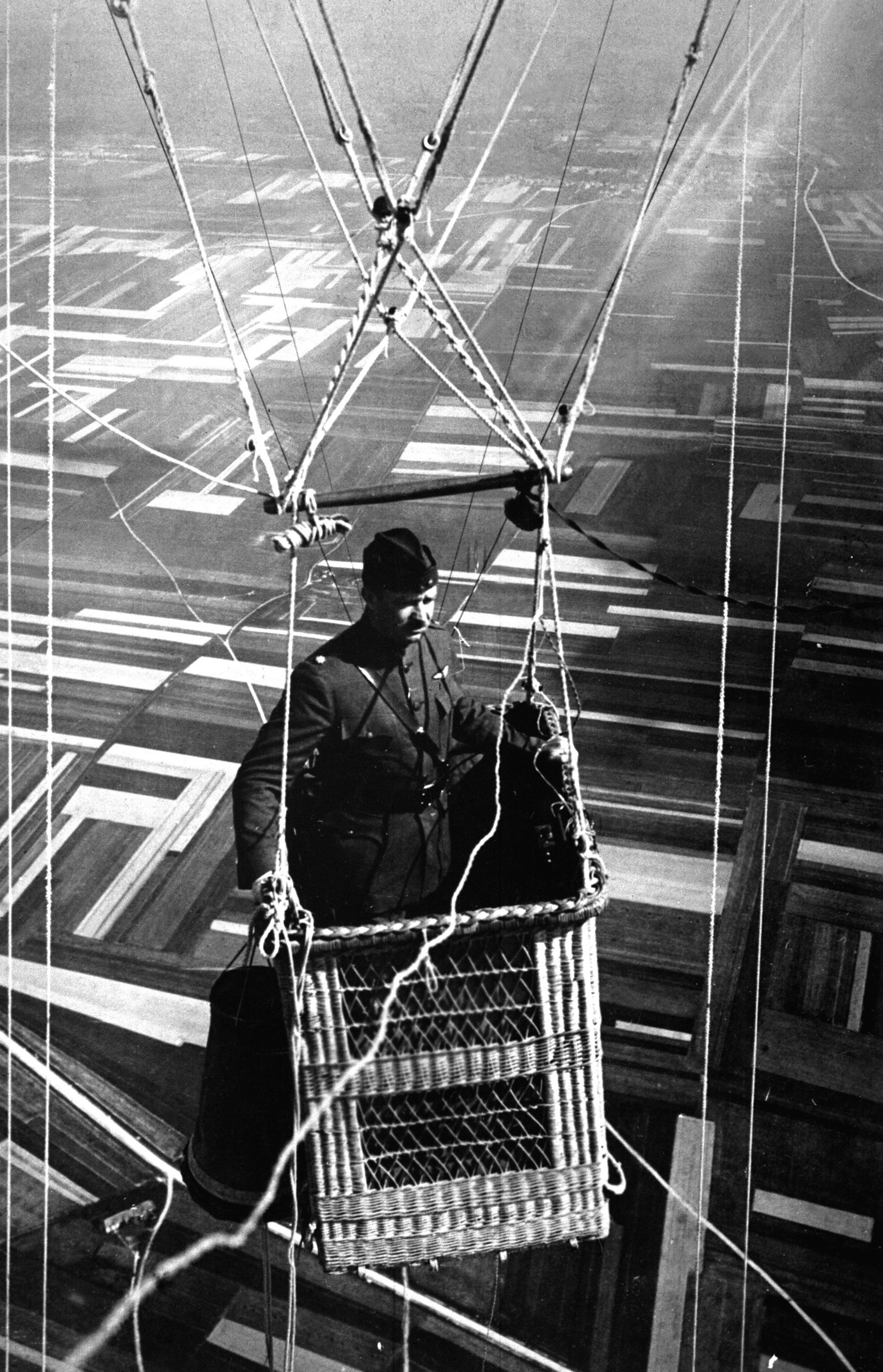
: Close-up view of an American major in the basket of an observation balloon flying near front lines

At the school, the company received French Caquot (U.S. Type R) observation balloons. It was trained on the equipment by members of the French Army, and, on 23 January, the first trial ascents with an observer in the basket were made. The company sent members to the front lines and operated under French control, making artillery adjustments for the 101st, 102, 149th and 150th French Artillery Regiments. Finally, on 29 February, training was ended and the 2nd Balloon Company was ordered to report to the First Army at Toul, arriving on 1 March, joining the French encampment of the 90th French Balloon Company at Camp L'Emitage, near Menil-la-Tour. It was the first American balloon company to reach the Western Front and enter combat.

The first observer of the company to be decorated was 1st Lieutenant Sidney Howell, when on 16 March, he was forced to jump from a burning balloon set on fire by enemy aircraft. He received a Croix de Guerre with palm. During the Chateu-Thierry operations, the company took a very active part, following the advance of Allied troops moving frequently as the front moved up. Frequently the balloons were attacked and set on fire by enemy aircraft, observers jumping and landing safely. The company took part in the St. Mihiel and Muse-Argonne offensives during 1918, making a total of 180 ascensions with 13 observers. The missions being hazardous with 9 balloons being shot down, however no squadron members were killed or wounded in action.

With the Armistice on 11 November 1918, the company was reassigned to the Third Army and ordered to report to Trier-Euren, Germany, in the Rhineland and performed occupation duty along the Rhine River. It remained with Third Army until 20 May until being relieved and ordered to return to the United States. After processing at the 1st Air Depot, Colombey-les-Belles Airdrome, France, the unit reported first to a staging area, then to a port for the return home.

The 2nd Balloon Company arrived at the Port of New York on 22 June 1919 on the USS Patria and transferred to Mitchel Field, New York, c. 23 June 1919, where the men were demobilized and returned to civilian life.

=== Inter-war period ===
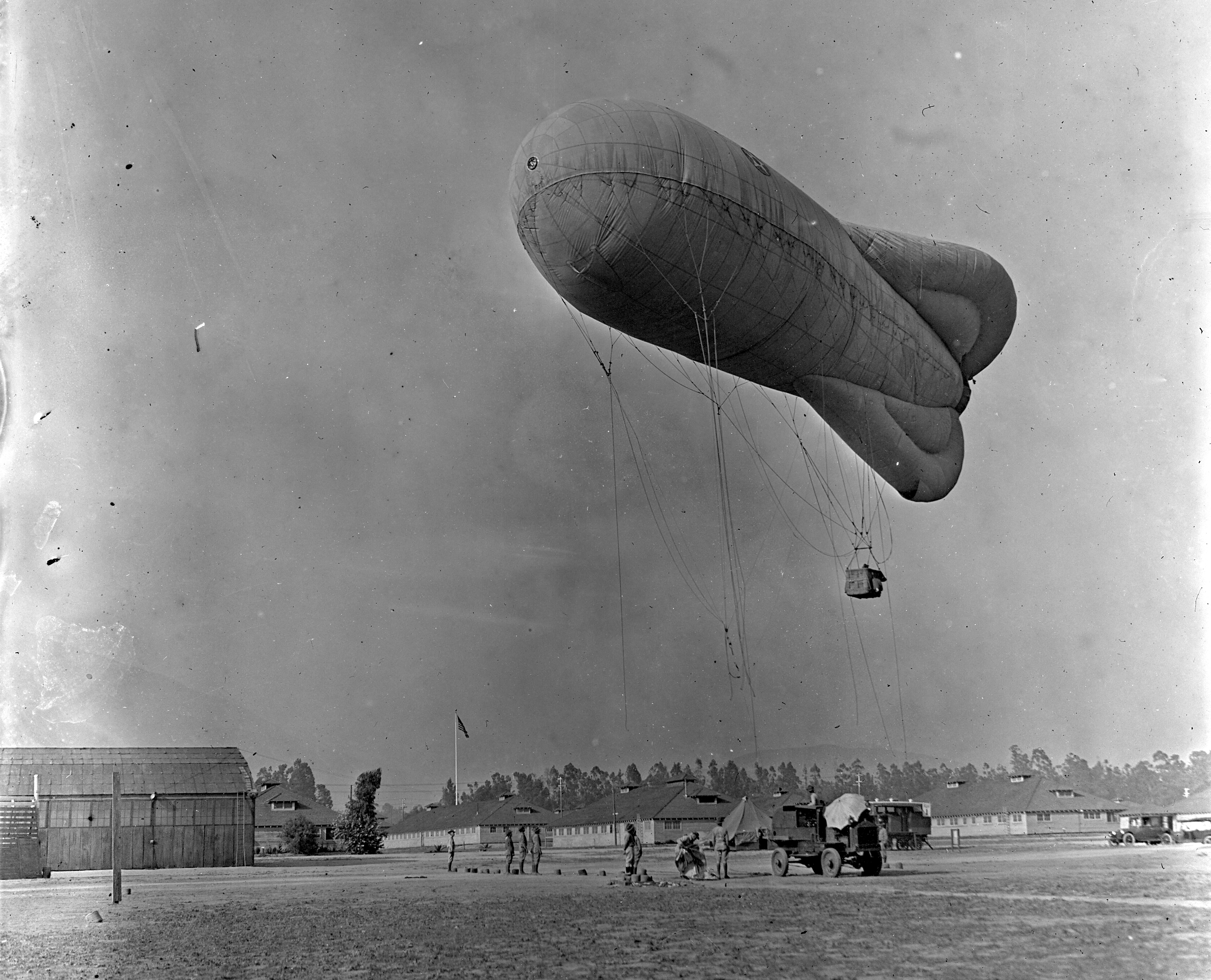
Type "R" observation balloon at Arcadia Balloon School, Arcadia, California, 1921

On 11 August 1919, the company was transferred to Ross Field, Arcadia, California without personnel or equipment. The unit was reorganized on 1 October 1921 and redesignated as the Air Service Balloon School Detachment. However, the Air Service decided to close Ross Field due to the Santa Ana winds, which blew in from the desert. These winds created much havoc with the aerial observation, ground training, and balloon handling. The detachment was disbanded and the remaining equipment left over from the war and some men were sent to Brooks Field, Texas. The unit was demobilized on 21 May 1922.

A new 2nd Balloon Company was constituted in the Regular Army on 18 October 1927, as part of the 26th Balloon Group at Fort Sam Houston, Texas. The company was assigned to the Army's Eighth Corps Area, however it was not activated. The designation was transferred to the Sixth Corps Area on 1 September 1928, before being organized at Fort Bragg, North Carolina on 29 May 1930. The unit was equipped with type C-3 observation balloons as well as type A-6 and A-7 spherical balloons. It was consolidated with its World War I predecessor unit on 6 August 1930.

At Fort Bragg, the unit was redesignated the 2nd Balloon Squadron on 1 October 1933, and equipped with C-6 observation balloons in 1938. It supported activities of the Coast Artillery Barrage Balloon Training Center at Camp Davis, North Carolina, 1940-41. Aircraft reconnaissance technology was making the manned observation balloon obsolete by 1940; the unit was last assigned on 1 September 1941 to I Air Support Command of First Air Force at Pope Field, before being disbanded on 3 February 1942 shortly after the Pearl Harbor Attack.

=== Strategic Air Command ===
In its early years, along with its own fighter wings for escorting its bombers, Strategic Air Command (SAC) formed a limited air transport capability to supplement that of the Military Air Transport Service, which provided SAC with the majority of its airlift support. The 2nd Strategic Support Squadron was organized and activated on 14 January 1949 at Biggs Air Force Base, Texas, where it drew its cadre from the 1st Strategic Support Squadron, which had moved to Biggs the previous month. The squadron was assigned directly to SAC's Eighth Air Force, but was attached to the host wing at Biggs, the 97th Bombardment Wing.

Initially flying Douglas C-54 Skymasters, the squadron carried much classified equipment and personnel to various locations around the world. During the 1950s the squadron operated from several SAC bases in various locations and was upgraded to the Douglas C-124 Globemaster II intercontinental airlifter in 1950. The squadron was inactivated on 15 June 1961 when SAC divested itself of its organic transport aircraft and transferred the mission back to MATS. In September 1985, the two squadrons were consolidated as the 2nd Tactical Electronic Warfare Squadron, but the consolidated squadron remained inactive.

=== Unmanned vehicle operations ===
The squadron was reactivated in the reserve as the 2nd Special Operations Squadron in 2009. With its history of being a combat reconnaissance unit, the squadron was assigned modern General Atomics MQ-1 Predator unmanned aerial vehicles (UAVs). The 2nd became the first Air Force reserve squadron to assume command of a UAV combat air patrol - a 24/7 orbit over a critical area of a combat zone.

The 2nd was originally established as a classic associate squadron with a bit of a twist. It was initially located at Nellis Air Force Base, Nevada, geographically separated from both its parent unit, the 919th Special Operations Wing at Duke Field, Florida, and its host associate unit, the Regular Air Force's 3rd Special Operations Squadron at Cannon Air Force Base, New Mexico. It is also geographically separated from the aircraft it operates, as all of the aircraft the squadron operates are owned by the active-duty unit, and all are deployed in combat areas. In 2014, the squadron relocated to its current home of Hurlburt Field, Florida, concurrent with its transition to the General Atomics MQ-9 Reaper.

Like many other UAV squadrons, the 2nd is composed of people with a wide range of aircraft experience in addition to the MQ-1 and MQ-9: AC-130 gunships, MC-130 Combat Talons, A-10s, Marine Corps AV-8 Harriers, Navy F-14s, F-15s, F-16s, Navy and Marine Corps F/A-18s, F-22s and bombers, tankers, airlifters, and even helicopters.

== Lineage ==
2nd Balloon Company

- Organized as Company B, 2nd Balloon Squadron on 25 September 1917

Redesignated 2nd Balloon Company on 19 June 1918
Redesignated Balloon School Detachment on 30 August 1921
Demobilized on 15 August 1922
Reconstituted and consolidated with the 2nd Balloon Company (active) on 6 August 1930

2nd Balloon Squadron

- Constituted on 18 October 1927

Activated on 20 May 1930
Consolidated with the 2nd Balloon Company (disbanded 1922) on 6 August 1930
Redesignated 2nd Balloon Squadron on 1 October 1933
Disbanded on 3 February 1942
Reconstituted and consolidated with the 2nd Strategic Support Squadron as the 2nd Tactical Electronic Warfare Squadron on 19 September 1985

2nd Special Operations Squadron

- Constituted as the 2nd Strategic Support Squadron on 31 December 1948

Activated on 14 January 1949
Discontinued and inactivated on 15 June 1961
Consolidated with the 2nd Balloon Squadron as the 2nd Tactical Electronic Warfare Squadron on 19 September 1985

- Redesignated 2nd Special Operations Squadron on 11 February 2009

Activated on 1 March 2009

=== Assignments ===
- Unknown, 25 September 1917-July 1918
- Balloon Wing, I Army Corps (later Balloon Group, I Army Corps), July 1918
- Balloon Group, IV Army Corps, 20 November 1918
- Balloon Group, VII Army Corps, 27 April-11 May 1919
- unknown, May–August 1919
- Balloon School (later Air Service Balloon Observers School), Ross Field, California, August 1919 – 15 August 1922
- Sixth Corps Area, 20 May 1930
- First Army, 30 December 1940
- I Air Support Command, 1 September 1941 – 3 February 1942
- Eighth Air Force, 14 January 1949 (attached to 97th Bombardment Wing until 18 April 1950, then to 509th Bombardment Wing)
- Fifteenth Air Force, 16 May 1951
- Second Air Force 1 September 1956
- Eighth Air Force, 1 January 1959
- 321st Bombardment Wing, 1 September 1959 – 15 June 1961
- 919th Operations Group, 1 March 2009 – present

=== Stations ===
- Fort Omaha, Nebraska, 25 September 1917
- Aviation Concentration Center, Garden City New York, 30 November–7 December 1917
- Camp de Coetquidan, Morbihan, France, 3 January 1918
- Camp de l'Ermitage (near Menil-la-Tour), France, 26 February 1918
- Villiers-sur-Marne, Aisne, France, 30 June 1918
- La Goneterie Ferme (near Bouresches), France, 22 July 1918
- Trugny (near Epieds), France, 25 July 1918
- Beuvardes, France, 28 July 1918
- Seringes-et-Nesles, France, 3 August 1918
- Chery-Chartreuve, France, 4 August 1918
- Courcelles-sur-Vesle, France, 12 August 1918
- La Queue de Theinard (near Domevre-en-Haye), France, 23 August 1918
- Bois de Remenauvaux (near Griscourt), France, 29 August 1918
- Bois de la Lampe (near Mamey), France, 12 September 1918
- St Pierre Ferme (near Fey-en-Haye), France, 15 September 1918
- Locheres, France, 22 September 1918
- Varennes-en-Argonne, France, 28 September 1918
- Cheppy, France, 2 October 1918
- Charpentry, France, 10 October 1918
- Apremont, France, 15 October 1918
- Chatel-Chehery, France, 25 October 1918
- Sommerance, France, 2 November 1918
- Saint-Juvin, France, 3 November 1918
- Buzancy, France, 4 November 1918
- Sommauthe, France, 6 November 1918
- Authe, France, 7 November 1918
- Les Petites-Armoises, France, 8 November 1918
- Auzeville-en-Argonne, France, 11 November 1918
- Mercy-le-Haut, France, 21 November 1918
- Euren, Germany, 8 December 1918
- Colombey-les-Belles Airdrome, France, c. 20 May 1919-unknown
- Mitchel Field, New York, c. 23 June 1919
- Ross Field, California, August 1919
- Scott Field, Illinois, 3 July–15 August 1922
- Scott Field, Illinois, 20 May 1930
- Fort Bragg, North Carolina, 19 June 1930
- Pope Field, North Carolina, 1933-3 February 1942
- Biggs Air Force Base, Texas, 14 January 1949
- Walker Air Force Base, New Mexico, 18 April 1950
- Castle Air Force Base, California, 16 May 1951
- Pinecastle Air Force Base (later McCoy Air Force Base), Florida, 1 September 1956 – 15 June 1961
- Nellis Air Force Base, Nevada, 1 Mar 2009
- Hurlburt Field, Florida, 3 Jul 2014 – present

=== Aerial vehicles ===
- Type R Observation Balloon, 1918–1919
- C-3 Observation Balloon, 1930–1939
- A-6 and A-7 Spherical Balloons, 1930–1942
- C-6 Observation Balloon, 1938 – c.1941
- Douglas C-54 Skymaster, 1949–1951
- C-124 Globemaster II, 1950–1961
- General Atomics MQ-1 Predator, 2009–2014
- General Atomics MQ-9 Reaper, 2014–present

== See also ==
- 1st Strategic Support Squadron
- 3rd Strategic Support Squadron
- 4th Strategic Support Squadron
