= Bar-lès-Buzancy =

- Commune
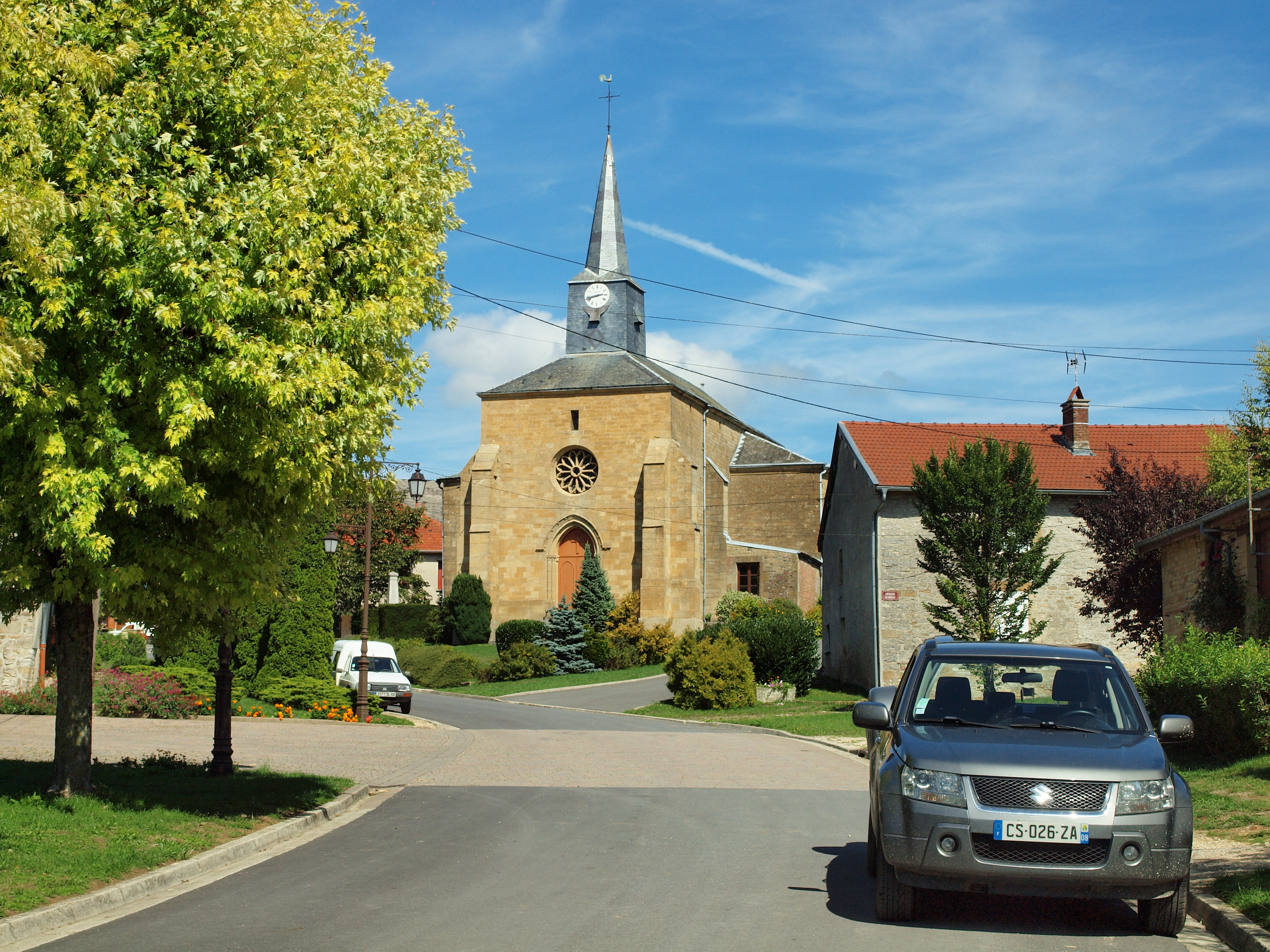
- The village centre and church
- Location of Bar-lès-Buzancy
- Location within France Location within Grand Est
- Coordinates: 49°26′02″N 4°56′32″E
- Country: France
- Region: Grand Est
- Department: Ardennes
- Arrondissement: Vouziers
- Canton: Vouziers
- Intercommunality: Argonne Ardennaise

Government
  - Mayor (2020–2026): Sophie Pontoise
- Area^{1}: 9.4 km^{2} (3.6 sq mi)
- Elevation: 182 m (597 ft)
- Highest elevation: 305 m (1,001 ft)
- Lowest elevation: 166 m (545 ft)
- Population (2023): 115
  - Density: 12/km^{2} (32/sq mi)
- Time zone: UTC+01:00 (CET)
  - Summer (DST): UTC+02:00 (CEST)
- INSEE/Postal code: 08049 /08240
- ^{1} French Land Register data, which excludes lakes, ponds, glaciers > 1 km^{2} (0.386 sq mi or 247 acres) and river estuaries.

Bar-lès-Buzancy (French pronunciation: [baʁ lɛ byzɑ̃si], literally Bar near Buzancy, before 1959: Bar) is a commune in the Ardennes department and Grand Est region of north-eastern France.

The commune has been awarded two flowers by the National Council of Towns and Villages in Bloom in the Competition of cities and villages in Bloom. (Their sign says three but the official website says two).

== Geography ==
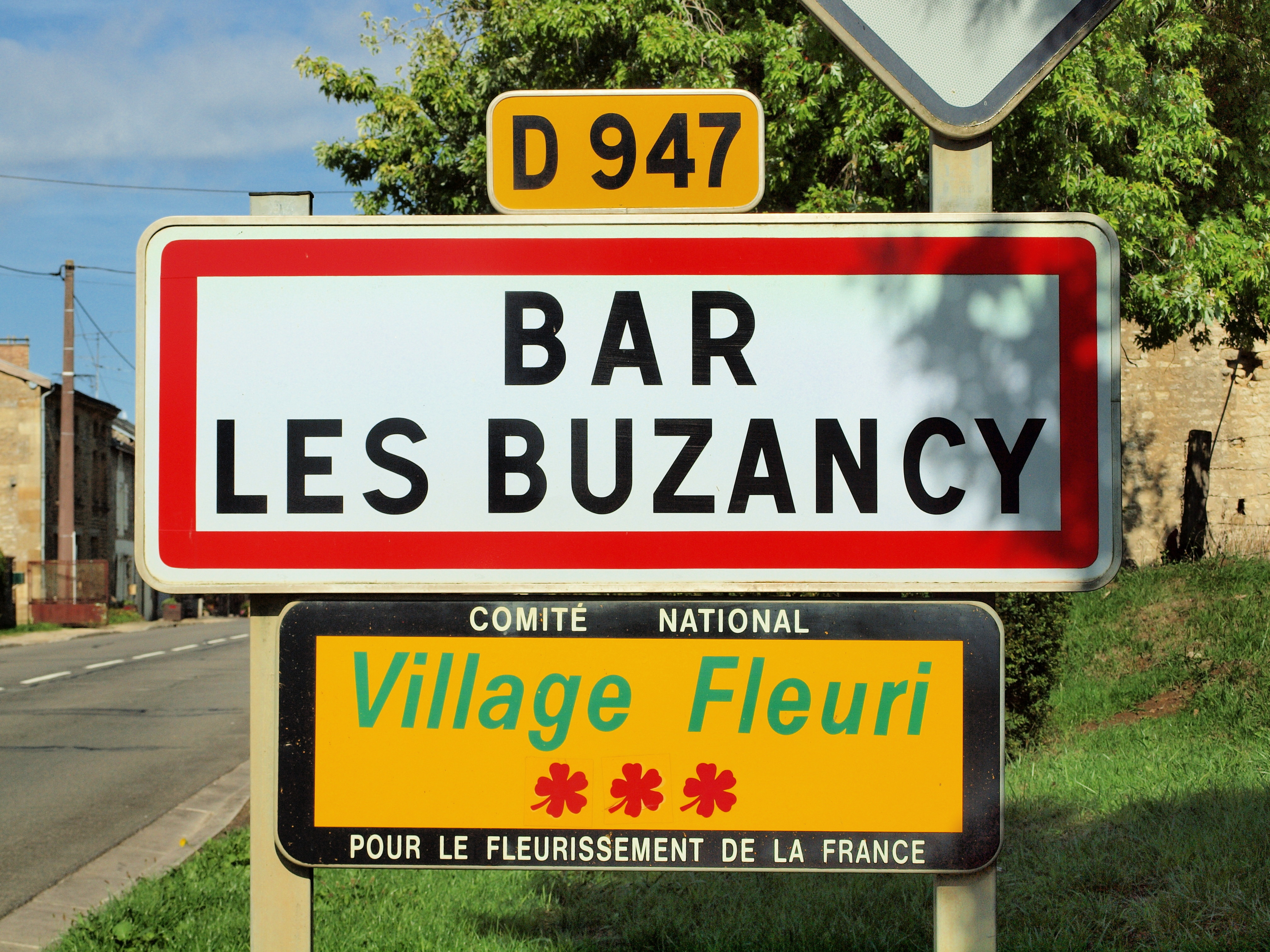
Entrance to the village

Bar-lès-Buzancy is located some 20 km east by north-east of Vouziers and 25 km west by south-west of Stenay. Access to the commune is by the D947 road from Buzancy in the south-east which passes through the south of the commune and the village and continues west to Harricourt. The D6 goes north from the D947 forming the western border of the commune and continuing north to Sommauthe. The commune is mostly farmland with some forest in the north.

The Ruisseau du Moulin rises in the north of the commune and forms part of the northern border before flowing south through the commune and the village and continuing south to join the Canal des Arches near Briquenay. La Hideuse stream forms the southern border of the commune as it flows south-west to join the Canal de Thenorgues.

== Toponymy ==
Bar comes from a Gallic word and perhaps even older (pre-Gallic) meaning "summit" or "height".

== History ==
Bar-lès-Buzancy appears as Bar on the 1750 Cassini Map and the same on the 1790 version.

From 1828 until 1871 the commune was merged with Harricourt to form the commune of Bar-et-Harricourt. In October 1952 two Merovingian skeletons were discovered during the excavation phase of construction of a house.

== Administration ==
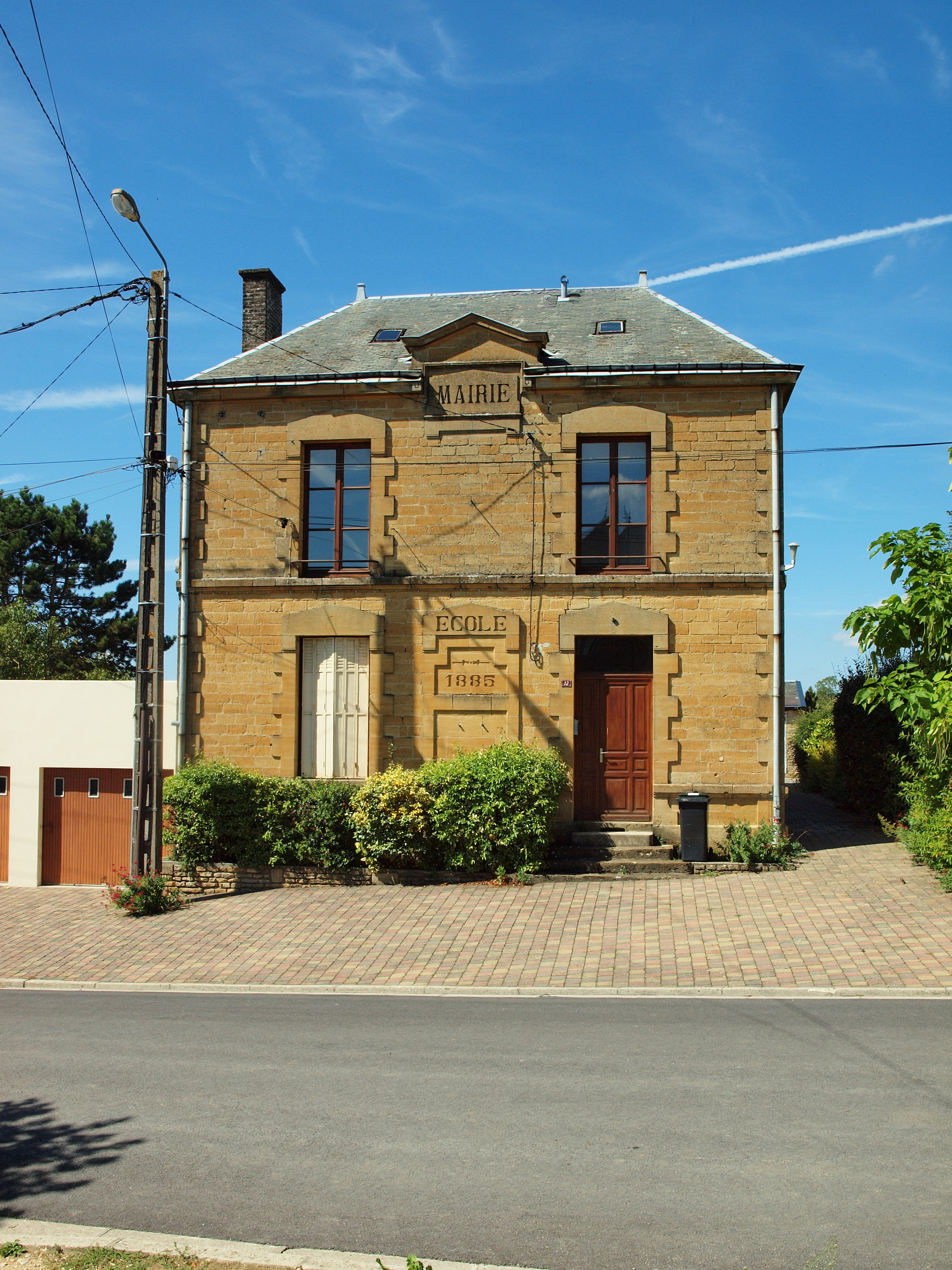
The Town Hall

List of mayors

| From | To | Name |
|---|---|---|
| 1965 | 2001 | Jean Potron |
| 2001 | 2008 | Michel Percebois |
| 2008 | 2020 | Francis Potron |
| 2020 | 2026 | Sophie Pontoise |

== Demography ==
The population data given in the table and graph below for the period 1831-1866 refer to the former commune of Bar-et-Harricourt.

Historical population

| Year | Pop. | ±% p.a. |
|---|---|---|
| 1793 | 144 | — |
| 1821 | 215 | +1.44% |
| 1831 | 458 | +7.86% |
| 1846 | 502 | +0.61% |
| 1866 | 432 | −0.75% |
| 1872 | 184 | −13.26% |
| 1901 | 176 | −0.15% |
| 1926 | 160 | −0.38% |
| 1946 | 149 | −0.36% |
| 1962 | 135 | −0.61% |

| Year | Pop. | ±% p.a. |
|---|---|---|
| 1968 | 137 | +0.25% |
| 1975 | 116 | −2.35% |
| 1982 | 126 | +1.19% |
| 1990 | 121 | −0.50% |
| 1999 | 98 | −2.32% |
| 2007 | 110 | +1.45% |
| 2012 | 122 | +2.09% |
| 2017 | 125 | +0.49% |
| 2023 | 115 | −1.38% |

Source: EHESS and INSEE

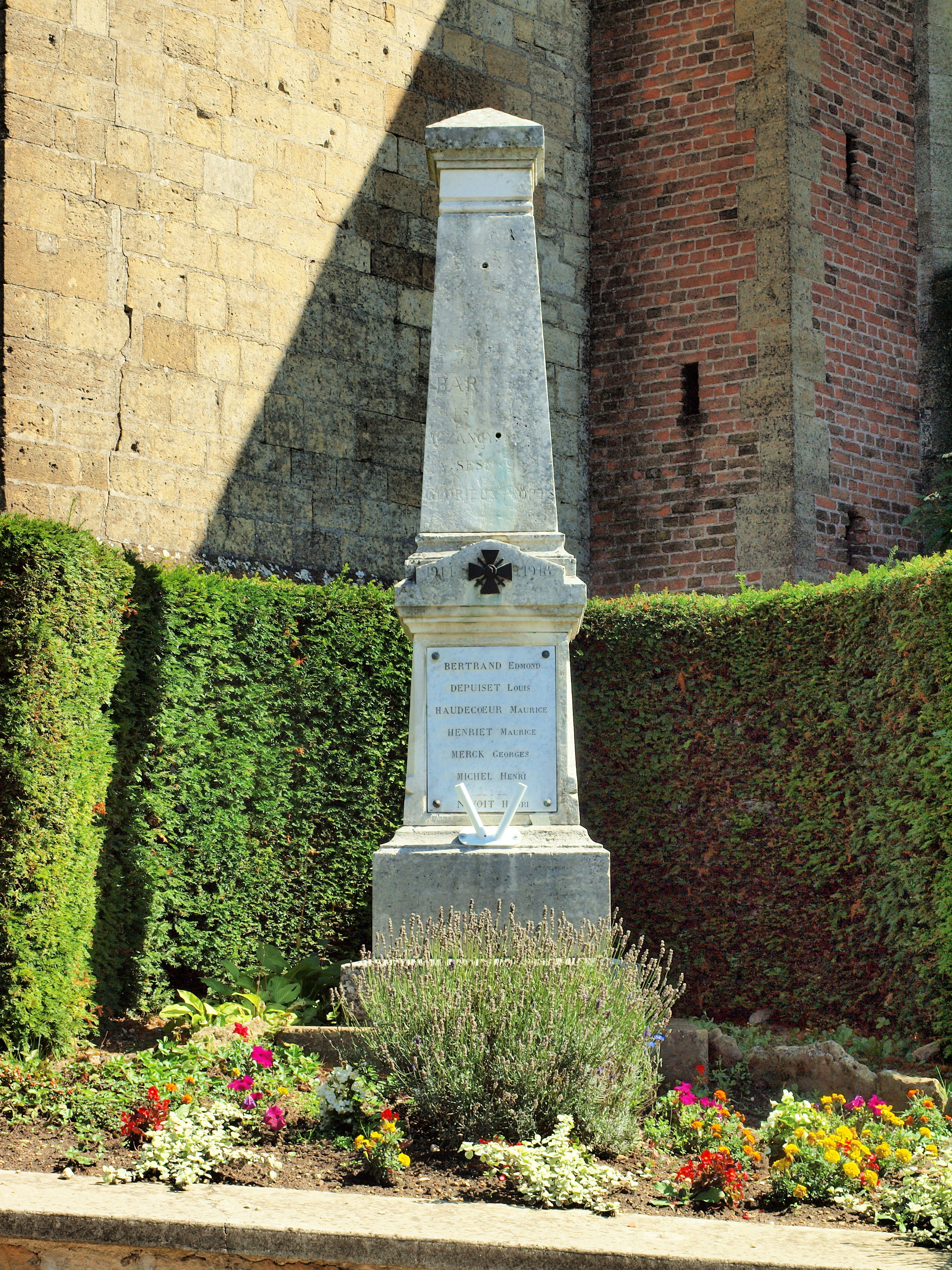
The War Memorial

== See also ==
- Communes of the Ardennes department
