= Buzancy =

Buzancy may refer to the following places in France:

- Buzancy, Aisne, a commune in the department of Aisne
- Buzancy, Ardennes, a commune in the department of Ardennes

== See also ==
- Bar-lès-Buzancy
