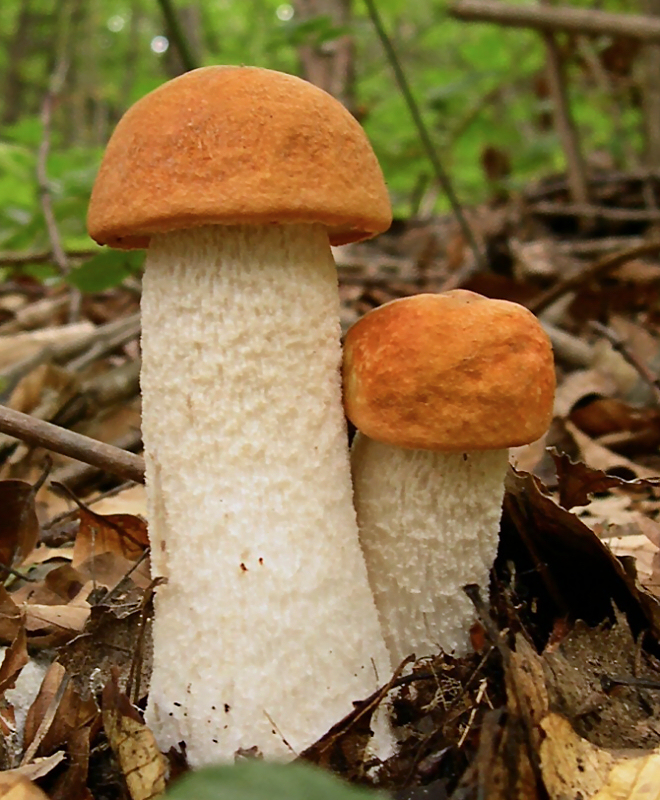

Scientific classification
- Kingdom: Fungi
- Division: Basidiomycota
- Class: Agaricomycetes
- Order: Boletales
- Family: Boletaceae
- Genus: Leccinum
- Species: L. albostipitatum

Binomial name
- Leccinum albostipitatum den Bakker & Noordel. (2005)

= Leccinum albostipitatum =

Species of bolete fungus

Leccinum albostipitatum
- Mycological characteristics
- Pores on hymenium
- Cap is infundibuliform
- Hymenium is adnexed
- Stipe is bare
- Spore print is ochre
- Ecology is mycorrhizal
- Edibility is edible

Leccinum albostipitatum is a species of bolete fungus in the family Boletaceae. This large, orange-capped mushroom forms beneficial relationships with poplar trees across Europe. First described scientifically in 2005, it was previously confused with similar orange species but can be distinguished by its white stipe with fine scales that darken with age and its flesh that changes colour when cut. The mushroom grows in poplar stands and mixed forests throughout Scandinavia and mountainous areas of central Europe.

== Taxonomy ==
Leccinum albostipitatum was scientifically described by the mycologists Hendrik den Bakker and Machiel Noordeloos in 2005, following comparison of Populus‑associated collections previously identified as Leccinum aurantiacum or Leccinum leucopodium. The holotype (M.E. Noordeloos 96134, herbarium L) was gathered on 10 September 1996 at Monte Bella, Trento, Italy. Morphological characters of stipe ornamentation and cap colour distinguished it from related European taxa.

== Description ==
The cap reaches 80–250 mm in diameter and is hemispherical when young, maturing to convex or plano‑convex. Its surface is finely tomentose and fibrillose, displaying a vivid orange that may fade toward the margin in older fruit‑bodies and often cracks slightly with age. The stipe measures 50–270 mm in length and 15–50 mm in thickness, initially whitish and densely clothed in fine white squamules that darken to light brown in mature specimens; handling typically induces a clear blue bruise. The flesh is white in the stipe base but turns vinaceous to greyish‑black when cut in the cap. Tubes are 9–30 mm deep, adnate to slightly decurrent, with pores about 0.5 mm wide that bruise brown. Microscopically, spores measure (9.5–)11.0–17.0 by 4.0–5.5 μm, spindle-shaped (fusiform) with a conical apex and shallow suprahilar depression. Basidia are 25–35 by 7.5–11.0 μm and four‑spored. Hymenial cystidia measure 20–45 by 7–10 μm (lageniform). The cap cutical (pileipellis) is a cutis of narrow cylindrical elements (35–80 by 4.0–15.5 μm) that appear yellowish‑brown in water. Caulocystidia are 15–65 by 10.0–16.0 μm, clavate to fusiform. Clamp connections are absent.

== Habitat and distribution ==
Leccinum albostipitatum grows solitary or in groups (gregariously) in mixed forests and poplar stands, strictly in ectomycorrhizal association with Populus species. It is not recorded from the Netherlands but is common in Scandinavia and the montane regions of central Europe, becoming rare at lower altitudes. Known localities include Monte Bella, Italy, Sommauthe/Beaumont-en-Argonne (Champagne-Ardenne, France), and Sogndal (Vestland, Norway).
