= 304th Special Operations Squadron =

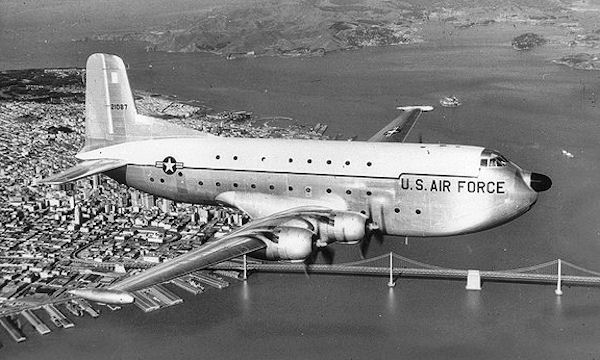
- C-124 Globemaster II as flown by the 4th Strategic Support Squadron
- Active: 1943–1961
- Country: United States
- Branch: United States Army Air Forces; United States Air Force
- Engagements: Asia-Pacific Theater

- Decorations: Air Force Outstanding Unit Award

Insignia
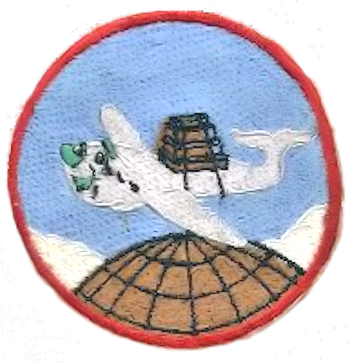
- Emblem of the 4th Strategic Support Squadron

The 304th Special Operations Squadron is an inactive United States Air Force unit designation. It was designated on 15 September 1985 by the consolidation of the World War II 304th Transport Squadron, which was disbanded on 1 December 1943 at Mohanbari Airport, India, and the 4th Strategic Support Squadron, which was discontinued and inactivated on 15 March 1961 at Dyess Air Force Base, Texas.

The 304th was a transport squadron which served primarily in the China-Burma-India Theater. It participated in the airlift of supplies and equipment from India to China over the Himalayan Mountains ("The Hump").

The 4th was a Strategic Air Command transport squadron providing a limited air transport capability to supplement that of the Military Air Transport Service (MATS).

== History ==
=== World War II ===
The squadron was activated by Tenth Air Force in India and equipped with C-47 Skytrains. It was assigned to the 30th Transport Group in the Assam Valley of eastern India, to aid in moving supplies to China by Air Transport Command (ATC). The squadron supplemented the ATC aircraft flying over "The Hump" into airfields in China. As more and more ATC aircraft arrived for the logistics mission to China, the 30th Transport Group was inactivated, and the assets of the unit were re-designated Station No. 9, India-China Wing, ATC.

=== Strategic Air Command ===
In its early years, along with its own fighter wings for escorting its bombers, SAC formed a limited air transport capability to supplement that of the Military Air Transport Service, which provided SAC with the majority of its airlift support. The 4th Strategic Support Squadron was activated on 18 February 1953 at Rapid city Air Force Base, South Dakota.

During the postwar years and through the 1950s the squadron carried much classified equipment and personnel to various locations around the world. It was moved to Dyess AFB, Texas on 15 June 1957, and was inactivated on 15 March 1961 when SAC got out of the transport bushiness.

=== Consolidated unit ===
The two units were consolidated on 19 September 1985, being designated as the 304th Special Operations Squadron, and assigned to USAF Special Operations Command. There is no record of the unit ever being activated in the Regular Air Force or Reserves.

=== Lineage ===
- Constituted as 304th Transport Squadron on 4 June 1943

Activated in India on 21 June 1943
Disbanded on 1 December 1943

- Reconstituted, and consolidated (19 September 1985), with 4th Strategic Support Squadron

Constituted on 3 February 1953
Activated on 18 February 1953
Discontinued, and inactivated, on 15 March 1961

- Consolidated squadron re-designated as 304th Special Operations Squadron on 19 September 1985 (Remained Inactive)

Re-designated as 304th Expeditionary Special Operations Squadron, and converted to provisional status, on 24 January 2005
Withdrawn from provisional status, and re-designated as 304th Special Operations Squadron, on 30 March 2011

=== Assignments ===
304th Transport Squadron

- 30th Transport Group, 21 June – 1 December 1943

4th Strategic Support Squadron

- Eighth Air Force, 18 February 1953
- Fifteenth Air Force, 1 April 1955
- 96th Bombardment Wing, 1 September 1959 – 15 Mar 1961

304th Special Operations Squadron

- Air Force Special Operations Command to activate or inactivate at any time after 24 January 2005.
- Withdrawn from Air Force Special Operations Command on 30 March 2011

=== Stations ===
304th Transport Squadron

- Mohanbari Airport, India, 21 June – 1 December 1943

4th Strategic Support Squadron

- Rapid City (later, Ellsworth) AFB, South Dakota, 18 February 1953
- Dyess AFB, Texas, 15 June 1957 – 15 March 1961

=== Aircraft ===
- C-47 Skytrain, 1943
- C-124 Globemaster II, 1953-1961

== See also ==
- 1st Strategic Support Squadron
- 2d Strategic Support Squadron
- 3d Strategic Support Squadron
