= 971st Airborne Warning and Control Squadron =

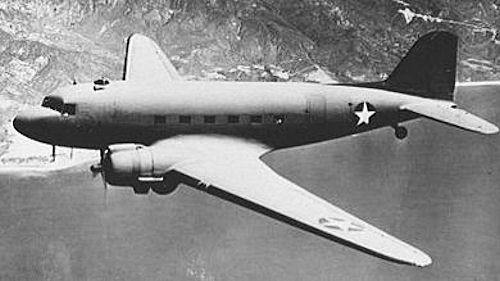
- 1st Troop Carrier Squadron C-47 flying over China, 1944
- Active: 1935–1945; 1946–1959; 1969–1971
- Country: United States
- Branch: United States Army Air Forces; United States Air Force
- Nickname(s): Green Hornets (1946-1949)
- Engagements: World War II: American Theater; Asia-Pacific Theater; China-Burma Campaign with Arrowhead China Defensive Campaign Central Burma Campaign China Offensive Campaign

- Decorations: Distinguished Unit Citation

Insignia
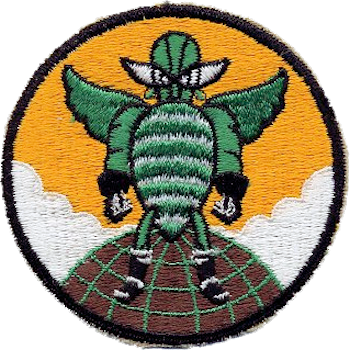
- Emblem of the 1st Strategic Support Squadron

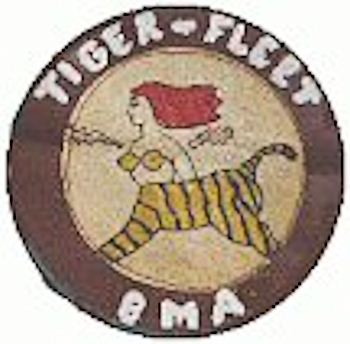
- Emblem of the 1st Troop Carrier Squadron (Unofficial)

The 971st Airborne Warning and Control Squadron is an inactive United States Air Force unit designation. It was designated on 15 January 1985 by the consolidation of the World War II 1st Troop Carrier Squadron, which was inactivated on 18 December 1945 at Fort Lawton, Washington; the 1st Strategic Support Squadron, which was inactivated on 15 January 1959 at Biggs Air Force Base, Texas, and the 1st Air Transport Squadron, which was inactivated on 20 June 1971 at Andrews Air Force Base, Maryland.

The 1st TCS was a transport squadron which served primarily in the China-Burma-India Theater. It participated in the airborne invasion of Myitkyina, Burma and other combat cargo operations in both Burma and China.

The 1st SSS was a Strategic Air Command transport squadron providing a limited air transport capability to supplement that of the Military Air Transport Service (MATS).

The 1st ATS was a Headquarters Command VIP transport squadron that replaced the 1001st Air Transport Squadron at Andrews Air Force Base.

== History ==
=== Origins ===
Prior to the early 1930s, transport aircraft in the Air Corps had been assigned to air depots and to service squadrons, although provisional transport squadrons had been formed for special projects. By 1932 Major Hugh J. Kerr, Chief of the Field Service Section of the Materiel Division, proposed the formation of a transport squadron at each air depot to act as a cadre for the transport wing the Air Corps proposed to support a field army in the event of mobilization. Major General Benjamin Foulois approved the formation of four provisional squadrons in November 1932.

On 1 October 1933 the 1st Provisional Transport Squadron was constituted. However, there were no funds to equip or pay personnel for the unit, which remained inactive. It was authorized to partially activate in 1935 at the Fairfield Air Depot, Dayton, Ohio in March 1935. The squadron was given a permanent designation as the 1st Transport Squadron in June and fully activated on 15 July 1935 with Bellanca C-27 Airbus aircraft assigned. With enlisted men as pilots, the squadron hauled engines, parts, and other equipment to airfields in their assigned depot area, returned items to the depot, and transferred materiel between depots. They also furnished transportation for maneuvers. The rapid transport of supplies by the squadrons permitted the Air Corps to maintain low levels of materiel at its airfields, relying on replenishment from depot stocks only when needed.

In May 1937, the squadron was reassigned from the Fairfield Air Depot to the newly activated 10th Transport Group, which assumed command of all four squadrons. The squadron received two-engine Douglas C-33s, the military version of the DC-2 in 1936 and Douglas C-39s (DC-2s with tail surfaces of the DC-3) in 1939 to replace the single engine Bellancas. These, and various other militarized DC-3s remained as the squadron's equipment until the entry of the United States into World War II.

=== World War II ===
After the Pearl Harbor Attack and the entry into World War II, in April 1942, its parent 10th TG was reassigned to the Air Transport Command (later I Troop Carrier Command) (I TCC). The 1st, now redesignated as the 1st Troop Carrier Squadron became an Operational Training Unit and converted to Douglas C-47 Skytrain transports. It moved to General Billy Mitchell Field, Milwaukee, Wisconsin, and it joined the 5th Troop Carrier Squadron carrying out operations and transition training for pilots. In September the 10th transferred to Pope Field, North Carolina, where it continued to be a training squadron for I TCC. In February 1943, the group's 1st and 2d Troop Carrier Squadrons deployed to the CBI Theater and were assigned to Tenth Air Force.

Upon the squadron's arrival in India, it was assigned to Tenth Air Force Headquarters. Upon its arrival with C-47s, it was decided that the squadron was to be attached to the Air Transport Command units in the Assam Valley of eastern India, to aid in moving supplies to China. The squadron was assigned to Chabua Airfield, and consisted of 13 C-47s, 42 officers and 62 enlisted men. After about a month, the squadron headquarters moved back to New Delhi, and flights of C-47s were sent to several airfields in the Assam Valley to supplement the ATC aircraft flying over "The Hump" into airfields in China. As more and more ATC aircraft arrived for the logistics mission to China, the squadron reformed at Sookerating Airfield in the Assam Valley in March 1943.

With the squadron's return to Tenth Air Force control, it began combat operations, primarily supporting American and British forces in Burma. The squadron was active carrying commandos who would parachute at low altitude behind enemy lines, and perform their mission. Frequently, the squadron would locate small groups of men in camouflaged areas and drop resupply containers out of the door of the aircraft, usually flying at low level with the aircraft vulnerable to enemy ground weapons fire. In late April 1944 the squadron supported the Allied attack on Myitkyina Airfield in northern Burma. The squadron flew paratroopers and also towed in CG-4A Waco gliders to the airfield during the battle; later moving in combat engineers and equipment to prepare the captured airfield to land reinforcements.

After the battle ended the squadron continued its combat operations, transporting Allied troops, evacuating wounded personnel, and hauling supplies and material, including gasoline, oil, signal and engineering equipment, medicine rations, and ammunition. The squadron's missions were concerned primarily with support for Allied forces that were driving southward through Burma, but the 1st also made flights to China.

The squadron was reassigned to Fourteenth Air Force in January and moved to China in August 1945, and received a Distinguished Unit Citation for transporting a Chinese army of more than 30,000 men from Chihkiang to Nanking in September 1945. The squadron returned to the US in December and inactivated on 18 December 1945.

=== Strategic Air Command ===
The 1st Air Transport Unit was organized at Roswell Army Air Field, New Mexico, in July 1946 as part of a reorganization of the 58th Bombardment Wing. Due to its classified nature and mission during World War II, the 509th Composite Group was set up as an independent unit with its own airlift squadron. With its assignment to Strategic Air Command (SAC) in March 1946, it was decided to convert the 509th into a bombardment group. The 1st Air Transport Unit assumed the mission of the 509th's 320th Troop Carrier Squadron, which was inactivated. (Note: The 1st Air Transport Unit also inherited the nickname "Green Hornets" from the 320th. This nickname derived from the green tail stripe used by the 320th as a unit marking during Operation Crossroads, the atomic bomb tests performed in 1946. "Green Hornets Famous World Over.") The 509th was redesignated as the 509th Bombardment Group, Very Heavy. The new transport unit was assigned directly to the 58th Bombardment Wing, the parent organization of the 509th, although operational control was retained by SAC headquarters.

The 1st continued the logistics support and special air transport mission of the inactivated 320th. In November 1946 the 58th Bomb Wing was assigned to Eighth Air Force and the 1st was also assigned directly to headquarters, Eighth Air Force. Little less than a year later, the unit moved to Fort Worth Army Air Field, headquarters of Eighth Air Force. As SAC and the Air Force began to expand, the unit supported SAC units in exercises and unit moves and deployment. As the only unit of its kind, it was called on for support in nearly all of these operations, including operations in Germany, Puerto Rico, Panama, Japan and Alaska. On 1 June 1948 it became the 1st Strategic Support Unit and moved to Biggs Air Force Base.

In early 1949 the unit participated in Operation Scordo, In this operation the unit transported support personnel and equipment to the four bases in Hawaii, the Philippines, Saudi Arabia, and the Azores, that were used by the Boeing KB-29 tankers that supported the first non-stop flight around the world by the Boeing B-50 Superfortress "Lucky Lady II". For this operation the unit received a commendation from the Secretary of the Air Force. It provided similar support for the first deployment of jet fighters from the United States across the Atlantic to Germany.

During 1949, as the mission load grew, the 1st became the 1st Strategic Support Squadron and provided the cadre for the new 2d Strategic Support Squadron. As the 2d was organized, the 1st transferred its Douglas C-54 Skymasters to the new squadron and began to re-equip with Boeing C-97 Stratofreighters. Eventually, a total of four strategic support squadrons, assigned directly to the SAC numbered air forces were organized around the United States.

The wartime mission of the squadron was based on the requirement for SAC's medium bombers to deploy to overseas bases to successfully reach their targets. Even with air refueling, some bombers would only reach a recovery base rather than its original launch base. SAC planned to use the squadron to transport personnel and equipment to recovery bases to perform maintenance and recovery operations. The attitude that SAC could not rely on other sources for this support was partly based in General Curtis LeMay’s experience during World War II when he had to rely on theater commanders for supply and found that theater supply channels could not keep up with the pace of strategic bombing operations. This convinced him that SAC needed total control of all aspects of a nuclear campaign.

During the postwar years and through the 1950s the squadron carried much classified equipment and personnel to various locations around the world. It was upgraded first to C-97 Stratofreighters in 1949 operating 12 of that type. In 1951 C-124 Globemaster IIs replaced the C-97s, the first C-124A arriving at Biggs on 18 January 1951. It was inactivated on 15 January 1959 when SAC got out of the transport business and the 97th Bomb Wing was transferred from Biggs to Blytheville Air Force Base, Arkansas.

=== Consolidation ===
On 15 January 1985, the Air Force Historical Research Agency consolidated these three units, and designated it as the 971st Airborne Warning and Control Squadron. The 971st was never activated and remains in an inactive status.

== Lineage ==
1st Strategic Support Squadron

- Constituted on 10 Jul 1946 as the 1st Air Transport Unit
- Activated on 30 July 1946

Redesignated as 1st Strategic Support Unit on 1 June 1948
Redesignated as 1st Strategic Support Squadron on 14 January 1949
Inactivated on 15 January 1959

- Consolidated with the 1st Troop Carrier Squadron and the 1st Air Transport Squadron as the 971st Airborne Warning and Control Squadron on 15 January 1985 (Remained inactive)

1st Troop Carrier Squadron

- Constituted as the 1st Provisional Transport Squadron on 1 October 1933

Authorized to be partially organized on 1 March 1935
Redesignated 1st Transport Squadron on 25 June 1935
Fully activated on 15 July 1935
Redesignated 1st Troop Carrier Squadron on 4 July 1942
Inactivated on 18 December 1945

- Consolidated with the 1st Strategic Support Squadron and the 1st Air Transport Squadron as the 971st Airborne Warning and Control Squadron on, 15 January 1985 (Remained inactive)

1st Air Transport Squadron

Constituted as the 1st Air Transport Squadron on 8 May 1969 (Note: There were two previous units that carried the designation 1st Air Transport Squadron. The first was the 1st Airlift Squadron. The second was a Major Command Controlled (MAJCON) unit organized by Military Air Transport Service (MATS) that was designated and organized on 1 June 1948 at Hickam Air Force Base, Hawaii. It was redesignated 1263d Air Transport Squadron on 1 October 1948, when the Air Force required all MAJCON units be numbered with four digits in blocks of numbers assigned to each major command. This squadron was discontinued on 20 July 1952, when MATS replaced its MAJCON units with Air Force controlled (AFCON) units by reviving World War II Ferrying and Transport squadrons. The 1263d was replaced by the 47th Air Transport Squadron. See Mueller, p. 234)

- Activated on 25 July 1969

Inactivated on 30 June 1971

- Consolidated with the 1st Strategic Support Squadron and the 1st Troop Carrier Squadron as the 971st Airborne Warning and Control Squadron on, 15 January 1985 (Remained inactive)

=== Assignments ===
1st Strategic Support Squadron

- 58th Bombardment Wing, 30 July 1946
- Eighth Air Force, 1 November 1946 – 15 January 1959.

1st Troop Carrier Squadron

- V Corps Area, 1 October 1933 (Not Active)
- Fairfield Air Depot, 15 July 1935
- 10th Transport (later Troop Carrier) Group, 20 May 1937
- Tenth Air Force, c. 2 February 1943

Attached to: India-China Wing, Air Transport Command, 2 February-7 March 1943
Attached to: Troop Carrier Command, Eastern Air Command, 20 December 1943 – 6 March 1944

- 443d Troop Carrier Group, 6 March 1944 – 18 December 1945

1st Air Transport Squadron

- 1st Composite Wing, 25 July 1969 – 20 June 1971

=== Stations ===
1st Strategic Support Squadron

- Roswell Army Air Field, New Mexico, 30 July 1946
- Fort Worth Army Air Field (later Griffiss Air Force Base, Carswell Air Force Base), Texas, on 22 September 1947
- Biggs Air Force Base, Texas, on 14 Dec 1948–15 January 1959

1st Troop Carrier Squadron

- Patterson Field, Ohio, 15 July 1935

Flight operated from Wright Field, Ohio, 15 Jul 1935 – 9 Feb 1937

- Billy Mitchell Field, Wisconsin, 26 May 1942
- Pope Field, North Carolina, 4 October 1942 – 9 January 1943
- Chabua Air Base, India, 2 February 1943
- Safdarjung Airport, New Delhi, India, 7 March 1943

Detachments operated from various bases in India and China

- Sookerating Airfield, India, 19 October 1943
- Warazup Airfield, Burma, 20 April 1945
- Dinjan Airfield, India, 1 June 1945
- Chihkiang Airfield, China, 28 August 1945
- Hankow Airfield, China, 25 September 1945
- Shanghai Airport, China, 21–30 November 1954
- Fort Lawton, Washington, 16–18 December 1945

1st Air Transport Squadron

- Andrews Air Force Base, Maryland, 25 July 1969 – 20 June 1971

== Aircraft ==
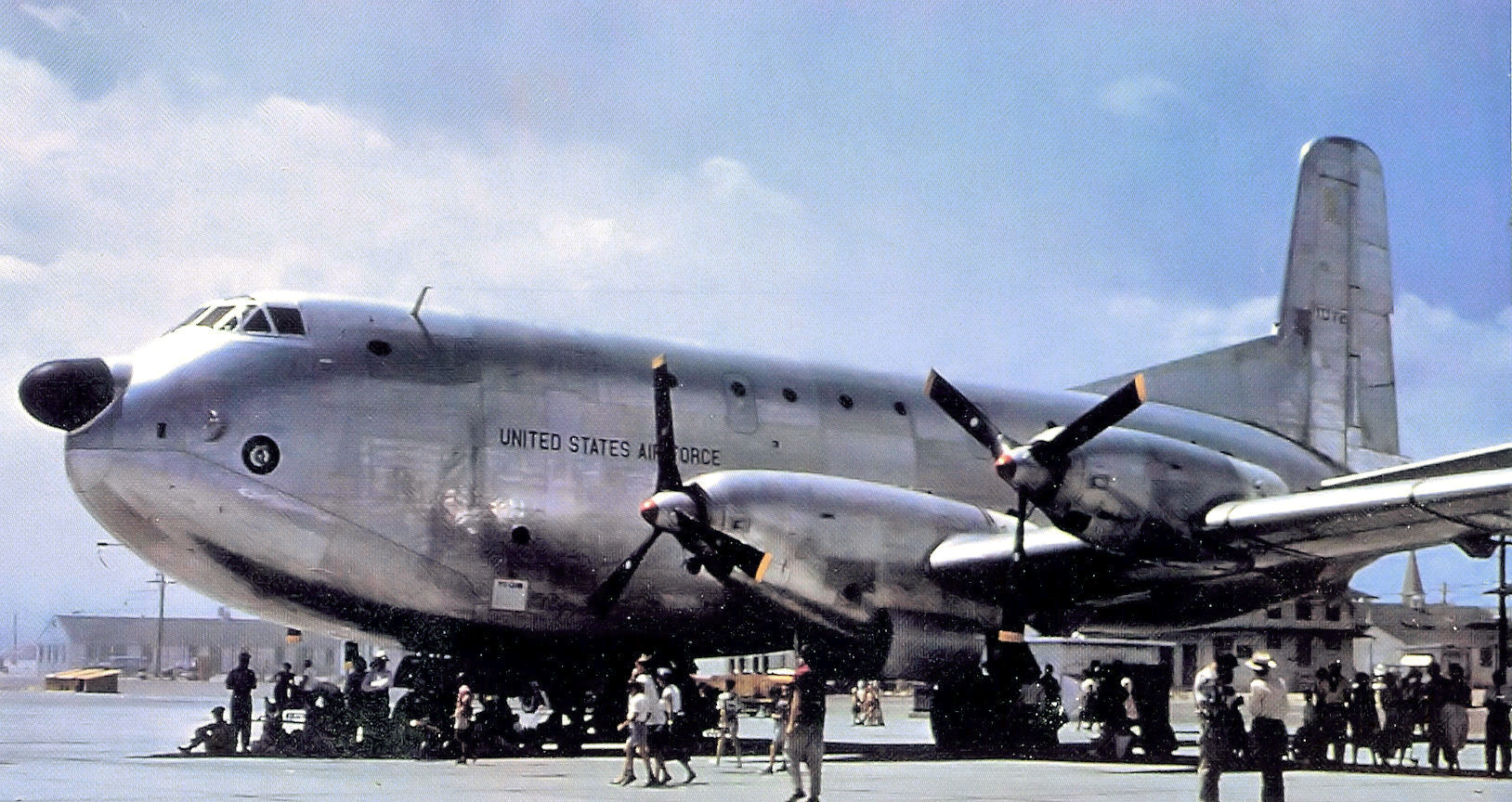
YC-124 Globemaster II of the 1st Strategic Support Squadron, 1954

1st Strategic Support Squadron

- Douglas C-54 Skymaster, 1946–1949
- Boeing C-97 Stratofreighter, 1949–1951
- Douglas C-124 Globemaster II, 1951–1959

1st Troop Carrier Squadron

- Bellanca C-27 Airbus, 1935–1937
- Douglas C-33, 1936–1939

Included Douglas C-39 and various modifications of civilian Douglas DC-3s 1939–1941

- Douglas C-47 Skytrain, 1942–1945
- Curtiss C-46 Commando, 1945

== See also ==
- 320th Troop Carrier Squadron
- 2d Strategic Support Squadron
- 3d Strategic Support Squadron
- 4th Strategic Support Squadron
