= 73rd Special Operations Squadron =

American military unit

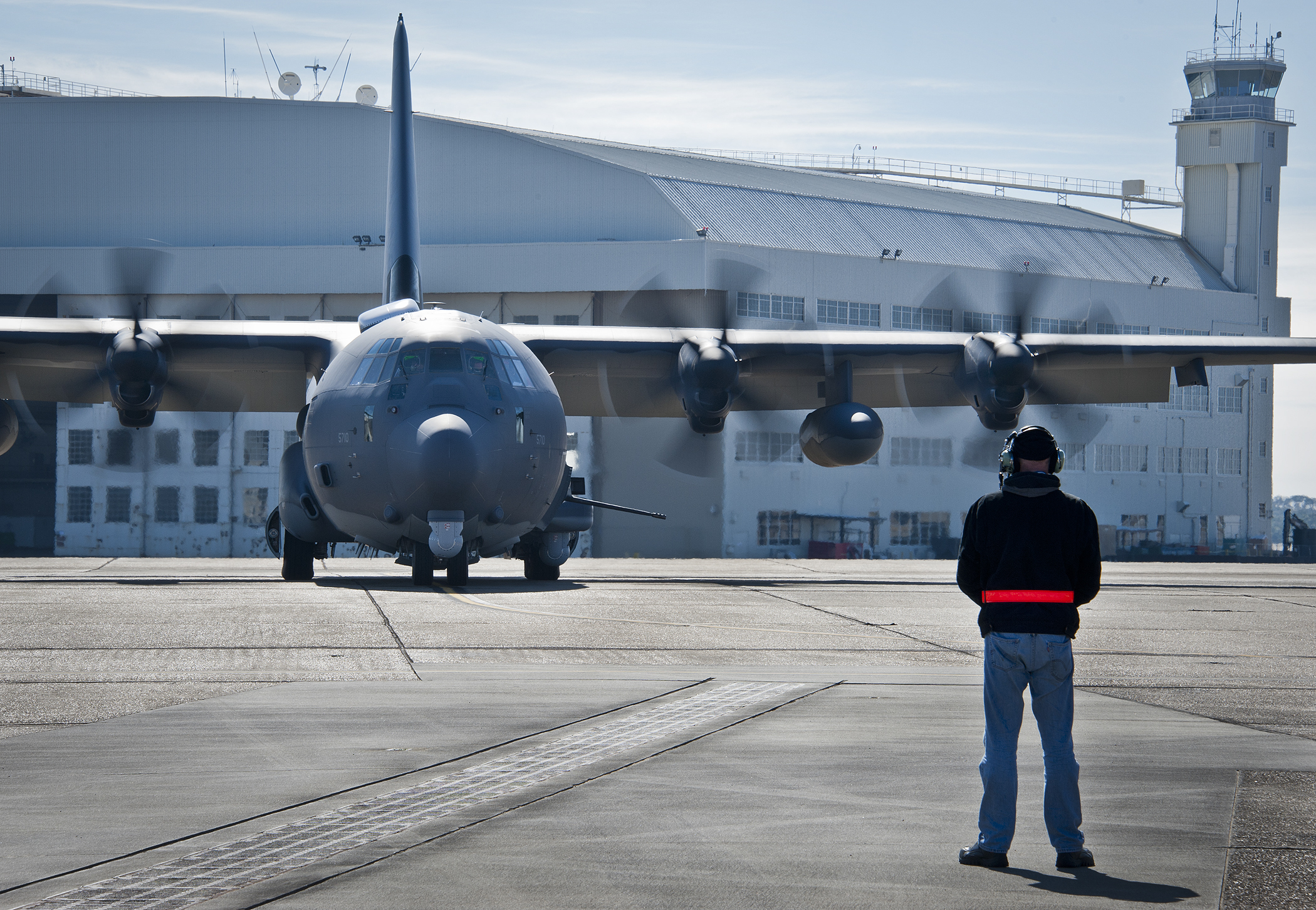
- AC-130J
- Active: 1918–2015; 2018–
- Country: United States
- Branch: United States Air Force
- Type: Squadron
- Part of: 1st Special Operations Wing > 1st Special Operations Group
- Garrison/HQ: Hurlburt Field
- Motto(s): Without Fail
- Engagements: World War I: Toul sector streamer, France, 31 October – 11 November 1918; World War II Aleutian Campaign

- Decorations: Air Force Outstanding Unit Award

Insignia
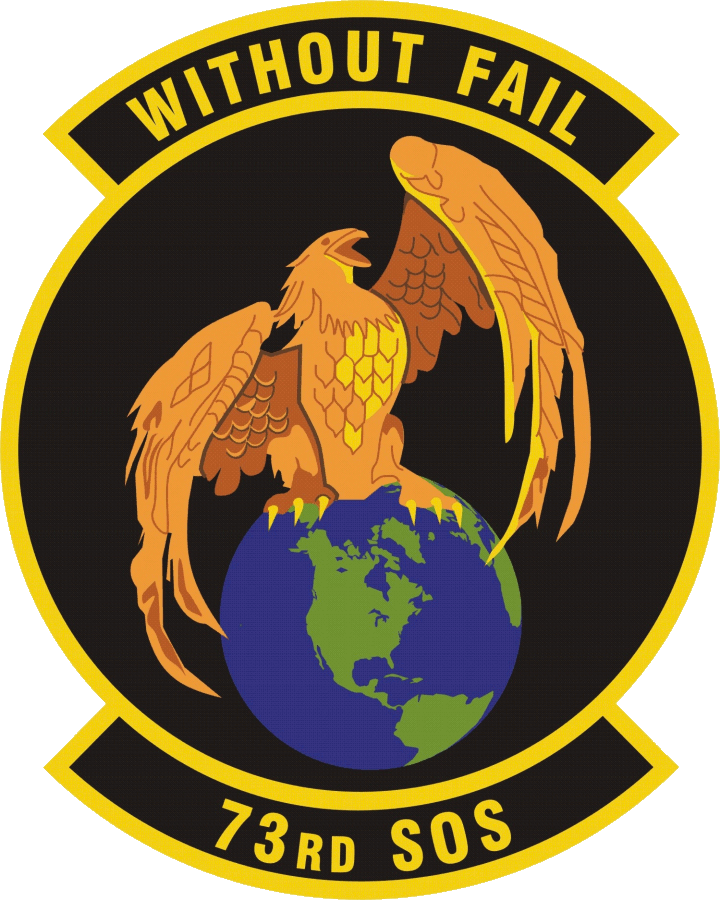
- 73rd Special Operations Squadron emblem (approved 27 June 2007)

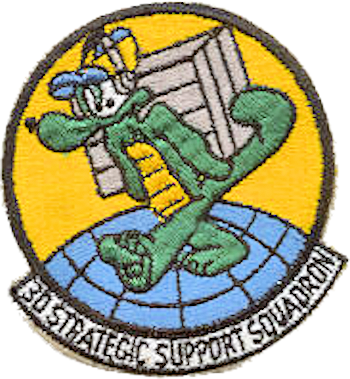
- Patch with 3rd Strategic Support Squadron emblem

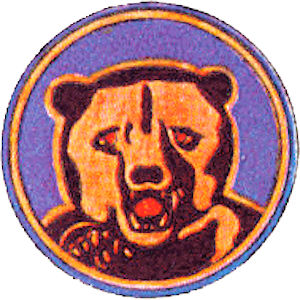
- 73rd Pursuit Squadron emblem (approved 23 March 1932)

The 73rd Special Operations Squadron is a unit of the United States Air Force, assigned to the 1st Special Operations Wing at Hurlburt Field, Florida. The squadron operates the AC-130J Ghostrider ground-attack aircraft in support of Air Force Special Operations Command.

The 73rd is one of the oldest in the Air Force, its origins dating to the formation of the 73rd Aero Squadron in February 1918. It served on the Western Front in France during World War I, and took part in the Aleutian Campaign during World War II. It was part of Strategic Air Command during the Cold War. The 73rd was inactivated and its personnel and equipment transferred to the 16th Special Operations Squadron in 2015. The squadron was reactivated on 23 February 2018 to fly the new AC-130J "Ghostrider" gunship assigned to the 1st Special Operations Group at Hulburt Field, Florida.

== History ==
=== World War I ===
The 73rd dates to the formation of the 73rd Aero Squadron at Rich Field, Waco, Texas on 22 February 1918. The first personnel were 150 privates under the command of 1st Lieutenant Loren W. De Motte, which arrived at the Aviation Camp. Once organized into a unit, the 73rd was transferred to Call Field, Wichita Falls, Texas, where it underwent basic indoctrination training. The men were also trained in aviation mechanic work.

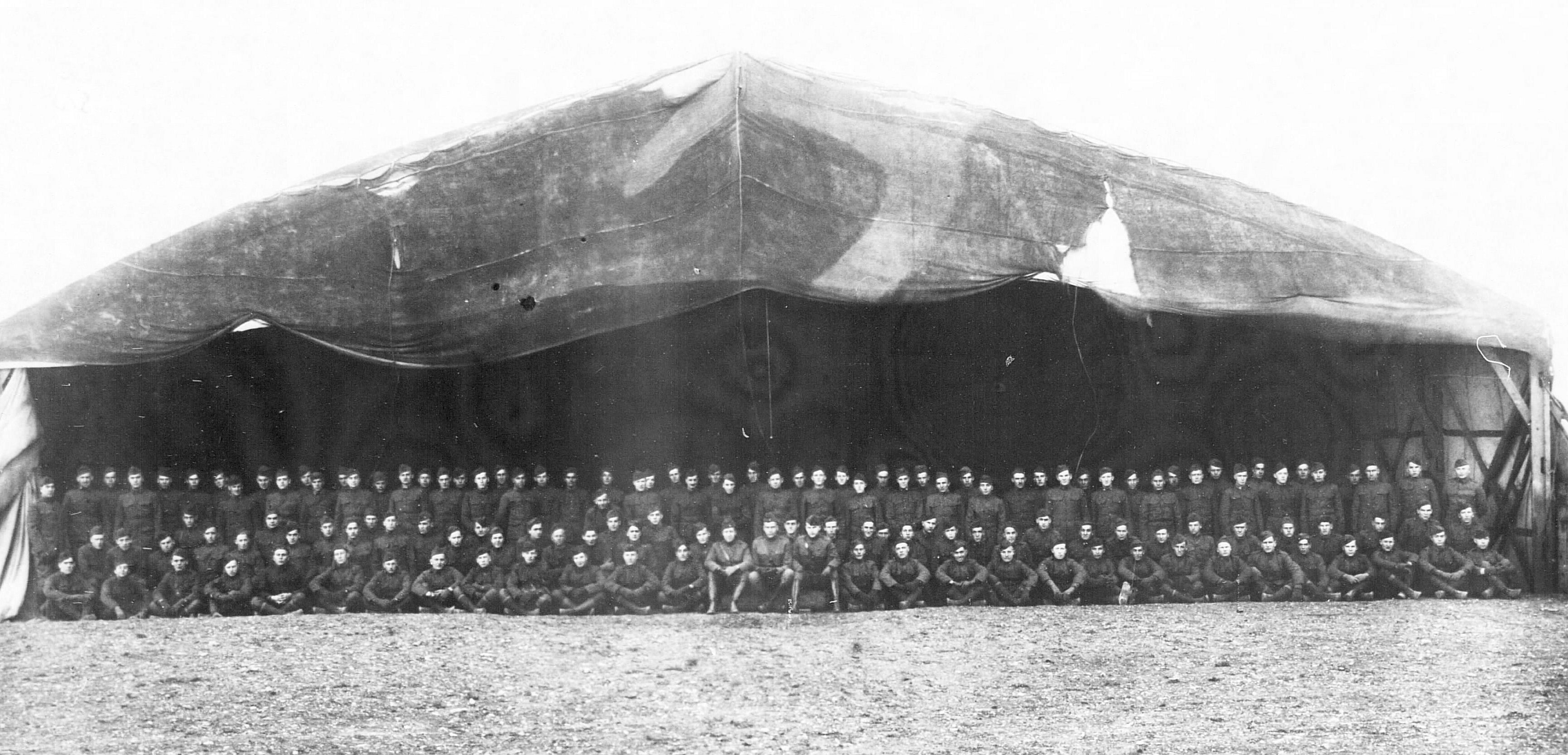
73rd Aero Squadron group photograph, taken at Ourches Aerodrome, France, November, 1918.

On 8 July, orders were received for the unit to proceed to the Aviation Concentration Center, Garden City, Long Island, for preparation to serve overseas. An observation balloon detachment of 30 men was assigned to the squadron at Garden City, and the unit moved to the Port of Embarkation at Hoboken, New Jersey on 29 July where it boarded a ship bound for France. After an uneventful crossing of the Atlantic, it arrived at the port of Brest, France on 26 August. At Brest, the balloon detachment was detached from the squadron, and the squadron was ordered to proceed to the St. Maixent Replacement Barracks for assignment. Initially assigned as a support unit to the 1st Day Bombardment Group at Delouze Aerodrome on c. 20 September, the squadron maintained Dayton-Wright DH-4s of the group. On 4 October, it was ordered to Colombey-les-Belles Airdrome, where it was reassigned to the Second Army. At Colombey, the squadron operated the 6th Air Park; a maintenance and supply organization as part of the 1st Air Depot. It moved to Ourches Aerodrome about 15 November

It remained in France after the Armistice in November, returning to the United States in June 1919 where it was demobilized at Hazelhurst Field, New York on 4 July.

=== Inter-war period ===
A new unit, the 73rd Headquarters Squadron was constituted in the Regular Army Reserve on 18 October 1927 at San Antonio, Texas. Army reserve officers assigned to the unit participated in summer training at Kelly Field, Texas, 1928–30 with the 3rd Attack Group. On 8 May 1929, it was redesignated as the 73rd Pursuit Squadron, and became an associate unit of the 18th Pursuit Group at Dodd Field, Texas.

The unit was activated on 15 July 1931 by the Army Air Corps as an active-duty squadron. It was assigned without reserve personnel to the 17th Pursuit Group at March Field, California and equipped with Boeing P-12 fighters. In 1934 it received new Boeing P-26 Peashooters but retained the P-12s. It was reorganized and redesignated as the 73rd Attack Squadron on 1 March 1935. The squadron was awarded the Frank Luke Trophy for 1935, having the highest gunnery score in the U.S. Army Air Corps.

On 5 June 1936 the squadron was consolidated with its World War I predecessor unit, the 73rd Aero Squadron. It received Northrop A-17 attack aircraft, replacing the Boeing fighters. The squadron flew reconnaissance flights in support of flood relief in southern California from 2 to 5 March 1938. Reorganized and redesignated as the 3rd Bombardment Squadron (Medium) on 17 October 1939, being re-equipped with Douglas B-18 Bolos.

It moved to McChord Field, Washington, 26 June 1940. The 73rd was relieved from assignment to the 17th Bombardment Group on 3 May 1941 and assigned to the 28th Composite Group.

=== World War II ===
The squadron moved to the new Elmendorf Field, near Anchorage, Alaska on 14 March 1941. It was one of the first Air Corps units assigned to the Alaska Territory. After the Japanese attack on Pearl Harbor, the squadron flew anti-submarine patrols over the Gulf of Alaska.

When the Japanese invaded the Aleutian Islands in June 1942 the squadron was reassigned to Fort Glenn Army Air Base on Adak Island. It and began flying combat missions over the captured islands of Kiska and Attu Islands. The squadron flew combat missions with Martin B-26 Marauders and later with North American B-25 Mitchell medium bombers during the Aleutian Campaign and returned to the United States in August 1943.

The squadron was transferred to Pyote Army Air Field, Texas, on 6 October, and was disbanded there on 1 November. Its personnel retrained as replacement crews for Boeing B-17 Flying Fortresses and its aircraft redeployed as replacement aircraft to overseas combat units.

== Postwar ==
In its early years, along with its own fighter wings for escorting its bombers, Strategic Air Command (SAC) formed a limited air transport capability to supplement that of the Military Air Transport Service, which provided SAC with the majority of its airlift support. The 3rd Strategic Support Squadron was activated on 16 November 1950 at Hunter Air Force Base, Georgia and assigned to the SAC Second Air Force.

During the 1950s the squadron carried much classified equipment and personnel to various locations around the world. On 5 January 1953, it moved to Barksdale Air Force Base, Louisiana, and reassigned to the 4238th Strategic Wing on 1 July 1959. The squadron was inactivated on 1 June 1961 when SAC got out of the transport business.

The 73rd Bombardment Squadron and the 3rd Strategic Support Squadron were consolidated as the 73rd Special Operations Squadron in 1985, but were not activated.

It was activated in 2006 to operate the new MC-130W Combat Spear aircraft. The 73rd was the first flying special operations squadron to move to Cannon Air Force Base after the fighter squadrons left.

As of April 2012, the MC-130W was re-designated as the AC-130W Stinger II due to the change on missions with the Dragon Spear conversion program.

On 12 June 2015, the squadron was inactivated and its mission, personnel and aircraft were combined with those of the 16th Special Operations Squadron.

The squadron was reactivated on 23 February 2018, it was assigned to the 1st Special Operations Group. The 73rd became the first AC-130J operational unit to fly the aircraft in 2018. The AC-130J Ghostrider gunship flew its first combat mission in Afghanistan in late June 2019 with the squadron.

== Lineage ==
73rd Aero Squadron

- Organized as 73rd Aero Squadron on 26 February 1918

Demobilized on 4 July 1919
Reconstituted and consolidated with the 73rd Attack Squadron as the 73rd Attack Squadron on 16 October 1936

73rd Bombardment Squadron

- Constituted as the 73rd Headquarters Squadron on 18 October 1927
- Redesignated 73rd Pursuit Squadron on 8 May 1929

Activated on 15 July 1931
Redesignated 73rd Attack Squadron on 1 March 1935
Consolidated with the 73rd Aero Squadron on 16 October 1936
Redesignated: 73rd Bombardment Squadron (Medium) on 17 October 1939
Disbanded on 1 November 1943
Reconstituted and consolidated with the 3rd Strategic Support Squadron as the 73rd Special Operations Squadron on 19 September 1985

3rd Strategic Support Squadron

- Constituted as the 3rd Strategic Support Squadron on 26 October 1950

Activated on 16 November 1950
Inactivated on 15 June 1961
Consolidated with the 73rd Bombardment Squadron as the 73rd Special Operations Squadron on 19 September 1985

73rd Special Operations Squadron

- Formed by consolidation of the 73rd Bombardment Squadron and the 3rd Strategis Support Squadron on 19 September 1985

Activated on 1 October 2006
Inactivated c. 12 June 2015
Reactivated on 23 February 2018

=== Assignments ===
73rd Aero Squadron
Post Headquarters, Rich Field, 26 February 1918
Post Headquarters, Call Field, 1 March 1918
2nd Day Bombardment Group, November 1918 – 1919
Eastern Department, 1919-4 July 1919

73rd Bombardment Squadron
17th Pursuit Group (later 17th Attack Group, 17th Bombardment Group), 15 July 1931
28th Composite Group, 3 May 1941
Second Air Force, 6 October – 1 November 1943

3rd Strategic Support Squadron
Second Air Force, 15 November 1950
4238th Strategic Wing, 1 July 1959 – 15 June 1961

73rd Special Operations Squadron
16th Operations Group, 1 October 2006 – c. 12 June 2015
1st Special Operations Group, 23 February 2018 - present

=== Stations ===
73rd Aero Squadron

- Rich Field, Texas, 26 February 1918
- Call Field, Texas, 1 March 1918
- Aviation Concentration Center, Garden City, New York, 16 July – 13 August 1918
- St. Maixent Replacement Barracks, France, c. 5 September 1918
- Delouze Aerodrome, France, c. 20 September 1918
- Colombey-les-Belles Airdrome, France, c. 5 October 1918
- Ourches Aerodrome, France, c. 15 November 1918 – 1919
- Hazelhurst Field, New York, 19 June – 4 July 1919

73rd Bombardment Squadron

- March Field, California, 15 July 1931
- McChord Field, Washington, 26 June 1940 – 10 March 1941
- Elmendorf Field, Alaska, 14 March 1941

Detachments operated from Fort Randall Army Air Field, Fort Glenn Army Air Base, Adak Army Airfield, and Amchitka Army Air Field, Alaska, 1942–1943

- Fort Glenn Army Air Base, Alaska, April 1943
- Amchitka Army Air Field, Alaska, June – 30 August 1943
- Paine Field, Washington, 14 September 1943
- Pyote Army Air Base, Texas, 6 October – 1 November 1943

3rd Strategic Support Squadron

- Hunter Air Force Base, Georgia, 16 November 1950
- Barksdale Air Force Base, Louisiana, 5 January 1953 – 15 June 1961

73rd Special Operations Squadron

- Cannon Air Force Base, New Mexico, 1 October 2006 – c. 12 June 2015
- Hurlburt Field, Florida, 26 February 2018 – present

=== Aircraft ===
73rd Bombardment Squadron (Medium)

- Boeing P-12, 1931–1934; 1935–1936
- Boeing P-26 Peashooter, 1934–1935
- Northrop A-17, 1936–1940
- Douglas B-18 Bolo, 1939–1942
- Martin B-26 Marauder, 1942–1943
- North American B-25 Mitchell, 1942–1943

3rd Strategic Support Squadron

- C-124 Globemaster II, 1950–1961

73rd Special Operations Squadron

- MC-130W Combat Spear/Dragon Spear 2006–2012
- AC-130W Stinger II 2012–2015
- AC-130J Ghostrider 2018–present

== See also ==
- List of American Aero Squadrons
- 1st Strategic Support Squadron
- 2nd Strategic Support Squadron
- 4th Strategic Support Squadron
