= Harricourt =

- Commune
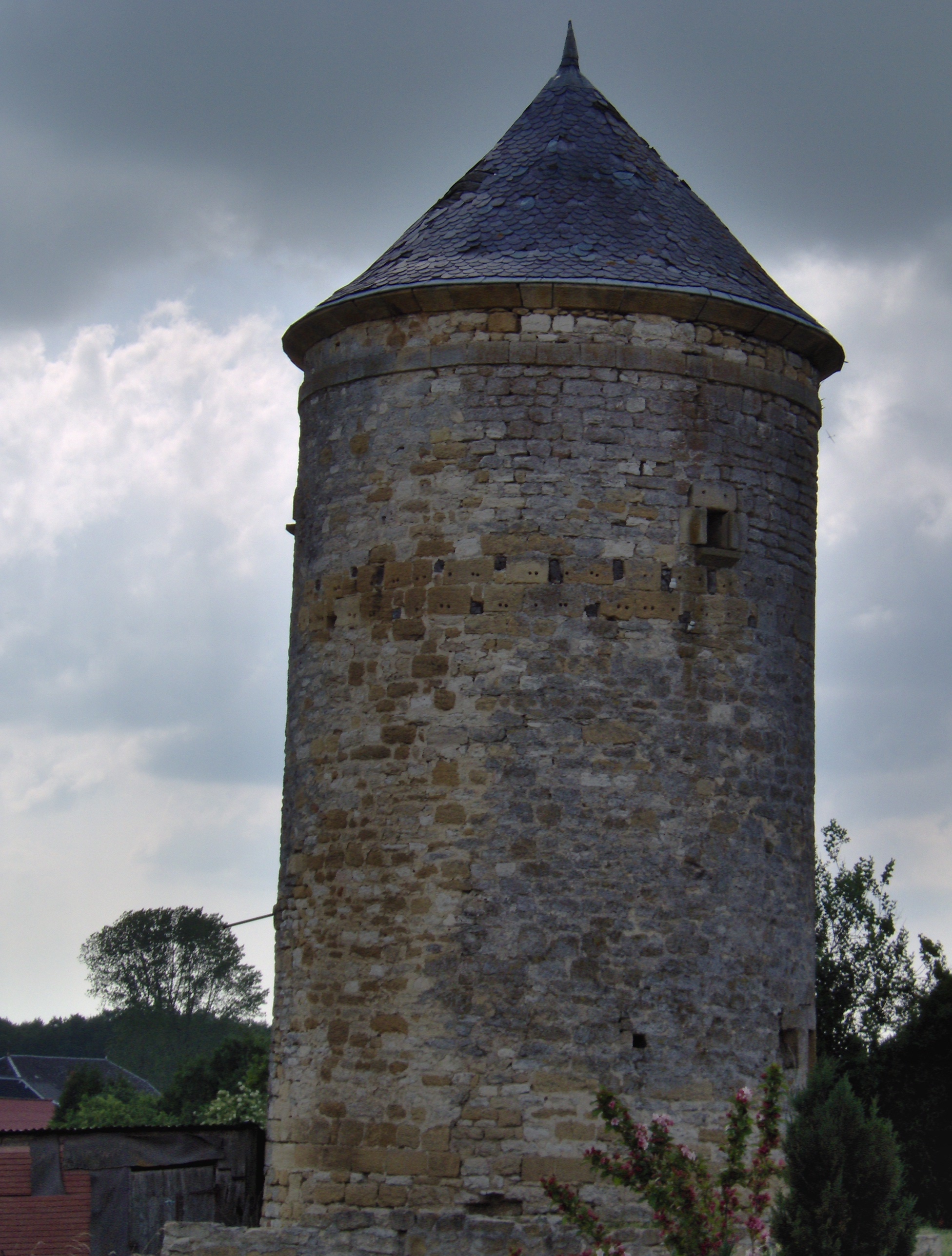
- Dovecote

- Coat of arms
- Location of Harricourt
- Location within France Location within Grand Est
- Coordinates: 49°26′05″N 4°55′48″E
- Country: France
- Region: Grand Est
- Department: Ardennes
- Arrondissement: Vouziers
- Canton: Vouziers
- Intercommunality: Argonne Ardennaise

Government
  - Mayor (2020–2026): Joël Carre
- Area^{1}: 7.87 km^{2} (3.04 sq mi)
- Elevation: 175 m (574 ft)
- Highest elevation: 261 m (856 ft)
- Lowest elevation: 165 m (541 ft)
- Population (2023): 46
  - Density: 5.8/km^{2} (15/sq mi)
- Time zone: UTC+01:00 (CET)
  - Summer (DST): UTC+02:00 (CEST)
- INSEE/Postal code: 08215 /08240
- ^{1} French Land Register data, which excludes lakes, ponds, glaciers > 1 km^{2} (0.386 sq mi or 247 acres) and river estuaries.

Harricourt (French pronunciation: [aʁikuʁ]) is a commune in the Ardennes department in northern France.

== Population ==
Historical population
Year	Pop.	±% p.a.
1968	80	—
1975	70	−1.89%
1982	74	+0.80%
1990	71	−0.52%
1999	60	−1.85%
2007	52	−1.77%
2012	39	−5.59%
2017	40	+0.51%
2023	46	+2.36%
Source: INSEE

== See also ==
- Communes of the Ardennes department
