= Sommauthe =

- Commune
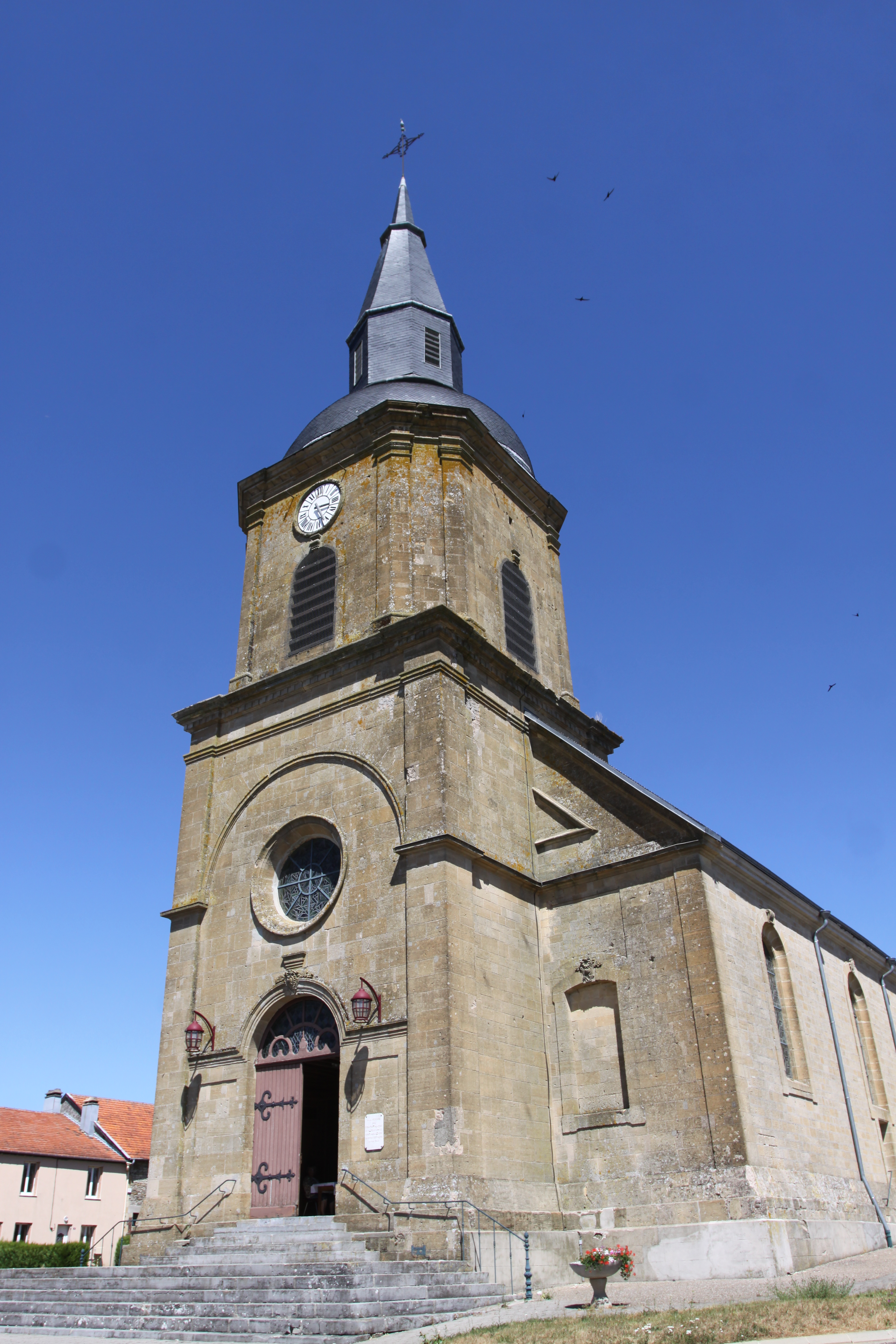
- The church in Sommauthe
- Location of Sommauthe
- Location within France Location within Grand Est
- Coordinates: 49°29′37″N 4°59′04″E
- Country: France
- Region: Grand Est
- Department: Ardennes
- Arrondissement: Vouziers
- Canton: Vouziers
- Intercommunality: Argonne Ardennaise

Government
  - Mayor (2025–2026): Yann Frangel
- Area^{1}: 9.78 km^{2} (3.78 sq mi)
- Elevation: 308 m (1,010 ft)
- Highest elevation: 290 m (950 ft)
- Lowest elevation: 177 m (581 ft)
- Population (2023): 132
  - Density: 13.5/km^{2} (35.0/sq mi)
- Time zone: UTC+01:00 (CET)
  - Summer (DST): UTC+02:00 (CEST)
- INSEE/Postal code: 08424 /08240
- ^{1} French Land Register data, which excludes lakes, ponds, glaciers > 1 km^{2} (0.386 sq mi or 247 acres) and river estuaries.

Sommauthe (French pronunciation: [sɔmot]) is a commune in the Ardennes department in northern France.

== Population ==
Historical population
Year	Pop.	±% p.a.
1968	178	—
1975	186	+0.63%
1982	157	−2.39%
1990	138	−1.60%
1999	109	−2.59%
2007	116	+0.78%
2012	119	+0.51%
2017	114	−0.85%
2023	132	+2.47%
Source: INSEE

== See also ==
- Communes of the Ardennes department
