= Buzancy, Ardennes =

Buzancy
- Commune
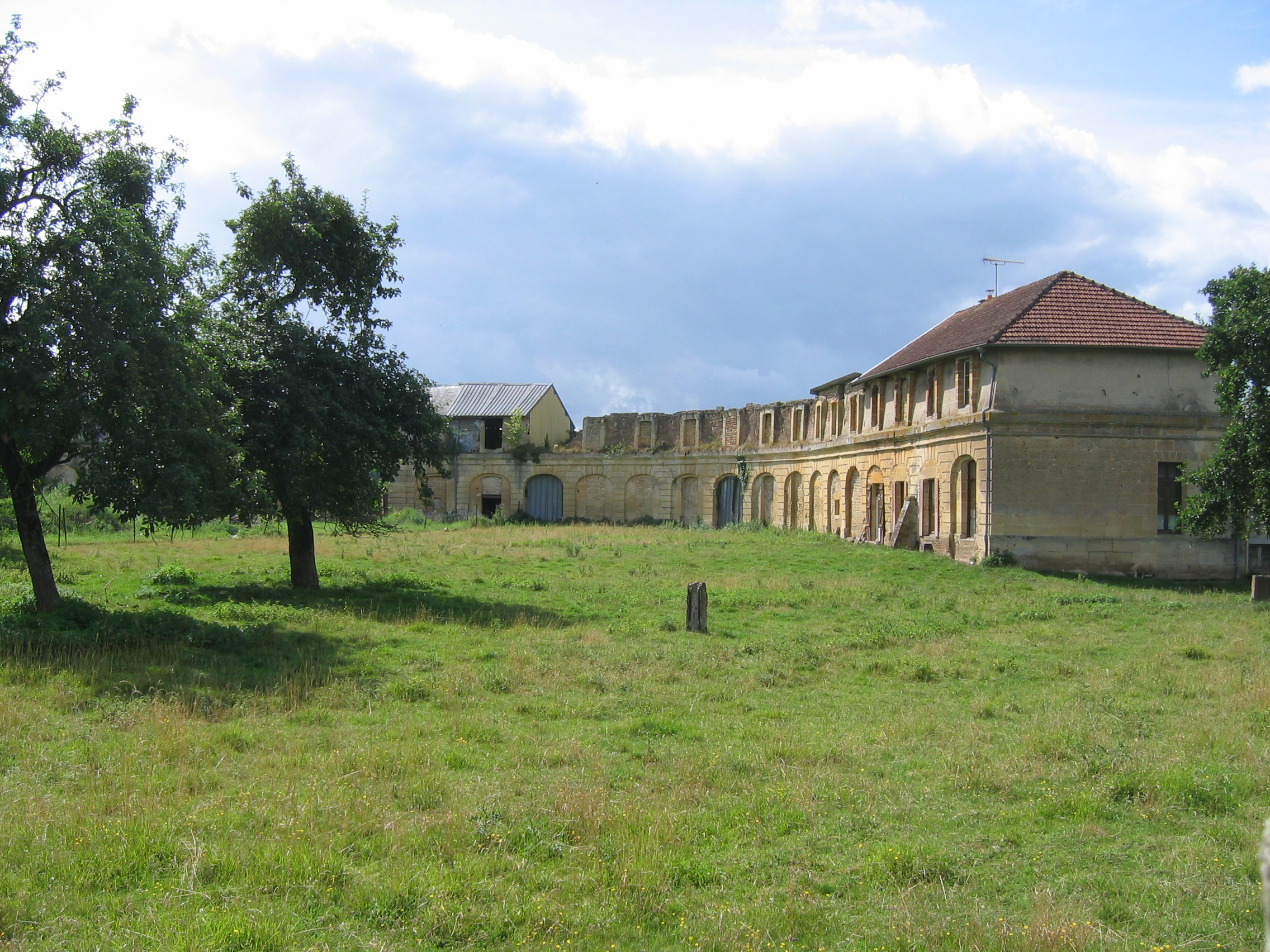
- Stables of the Château Augeard

- Coat of arms
- Location of Buzancy
- Location within France Location within Grand Est
- Coordinates: 49°25′37″N 4°57′20″E
- Country: France
- Region: Grand Est
- Department: Ardennes
- Arrondissement: Vouziers
- Canton: Vouziers
- Intercommunality: Argonne Ardennaise

Government
  - Mayor (2020–2026): Léopold Désiré Nanji
- Area^{1}: 22.67 km^{2} (8.75 sq mi)
- Elevation: 175 m (574 ft)
- Highest elevation: 291 m (955 ft)
- Lowest elevation: 166 m (545 ft)
- Population (2023): 380
  - Density: 17/km^{2} (43/sq mi)
- Time zone: UTC+01:00 (CET)
  - Summer (DST): UTC+02:00 (CEST)
- INSEE/Postal code: 08089 /08240
- ^{1} French Land Register data, which excludes lakes, ponds, glaciers > 1 km^{2} (0.386 sq mi or 247 acres) and river estuaries.

Buzancy (French pronunciation: [byzɑ̃si]) is a commune in the Ardennes department and Grand Est region of north-eastern France. In 1974, it absorbed the former commune Sivry-lès-Buzancy.

== Population ==
Historical population
Year	Pop.	±% p.a.
1968	501	—
1975	451	−1.49%
1982	470	+0.59%
1990	446	−0.65%
1999	411	−0.90%
2007	369	−1.34%
2012	365	−0.22%
2017	348	−0.95%
2023	380	+1.48%
Source: INSEE

== See also ==
- Communes of the Ardennes department
