= Aure =

Aure may refer to:

== Places ==
=== France ===
- Aure, Ardennes, a commune of the Ardennes département
- Aure (river), a river in northwestern France

=== Norway ===
- Aure Municipality, a municipality in Møre og Romsdal county
- Aure (village), a village within Aure Municipality in Møre og Romsdal county
- Aure, Sykkylven, a village in Sykkylven Municipality in Møre og Romsdal county

== People ==
- Aure Atika, French actress, writer and director
- Aud Inger Aure, Norwegian politician for the Christian People's Party
- Gregory Aure, English politician
- One of two known speakers of the Aurê–Aurá language

== Other ==
- Aure et Saint-Girons, a French breed of cattle
