= Aure, Ardennes =

Aure
- Commune
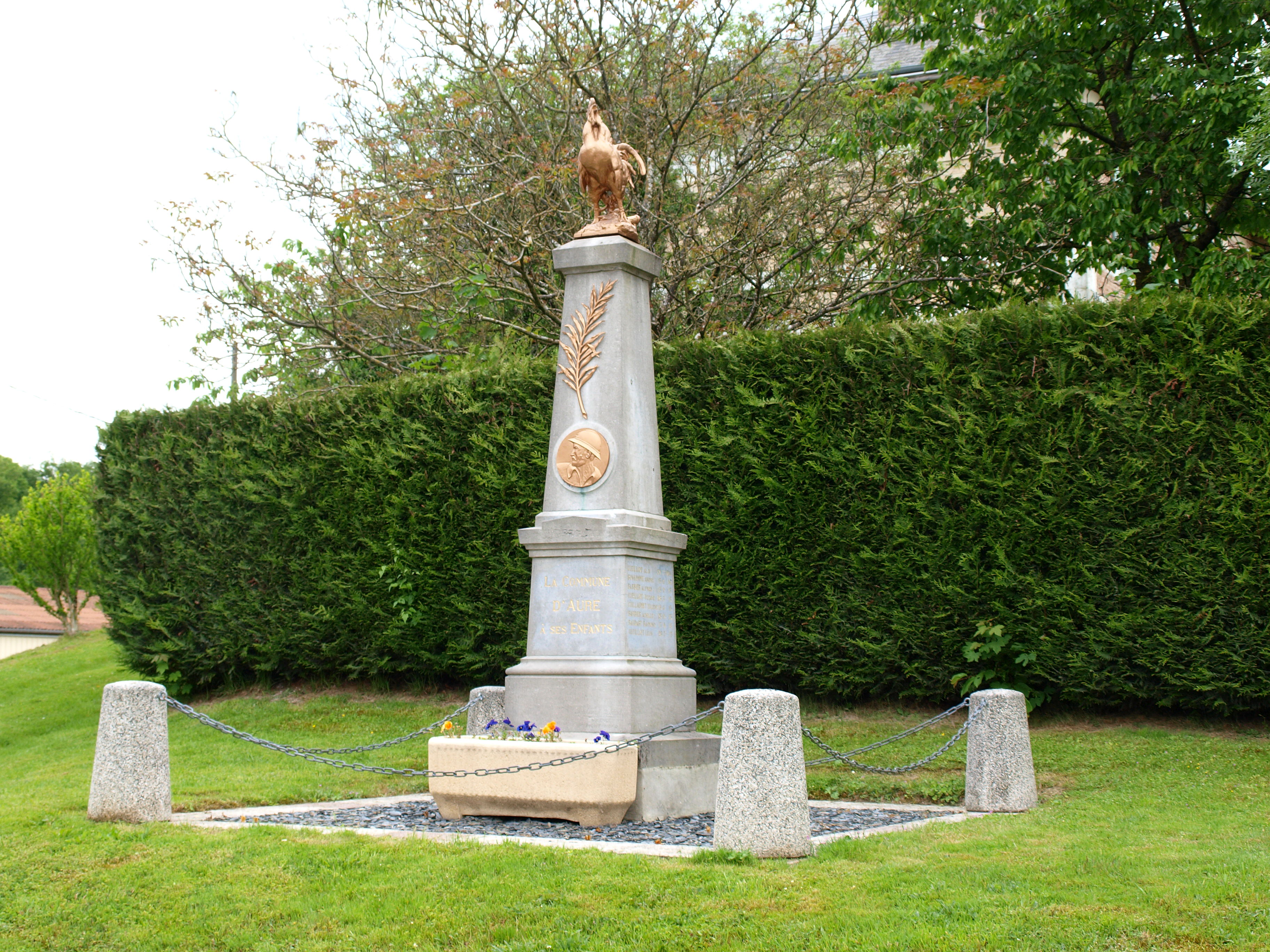
- The Aure War memorial
- Location of Aure
- Location within France Location within Grand Est
- Coordinates: 49°16′29″N 4°38′11″E
- Country: France
- Region: Grand Est
- Department: Ardennes
- Arrondissement: Vouziers
- Canton: Attigny
- Intercommunality: CC Argonne Ardennaise

Government
  - Mayor (2020–2026): Cédric Nicolitch
- Area^{1}: 12.72 km^{2} (4.91 sq mi)
- Elevation: 135 m (443 ft)
- Highest elevation: 191 m (627 ft)
- Lowest elevation: 118 m (387 ft)
- Population (2023): 40
  - Density: 3.1/km^{2} (8.1/sq mi)
- Time zone: UTC+01:00 (CET)
  - Summer (DST): UTC+02:00 (CEST)
- INSEE/Postal code: 08031 /08400
- ^{1} French Land Register data, which excludes lakes, ponds, glaciers > 1 km^{2} (0.386 sq mi or 247 acres) and river estuaries.

Aure (French pronunciation: [ɔʁ]) is a commune in the Ardennes department in the Grand Est region of north-eastern France.

== Geography ==
Aure is located some 55 km east of Reims and some 20 km south by south-west of Vouziers. The western border of the commune is the border between Ardennes and Marne departments. Access to the commune is by road D6 from Manre in the south-east which passes through the village and continues south-west, changing to the D20 in Marne, to Sommepy-Tahure. The D306 goes north-east from the village to Monthois. The commune is entirely farmland.

The Allin river rises near the village and flows south-east to eventually join the Aisne at Brécy-Brières.

== History ==
Aure is cited in a poem by Louis Aragon Le conscrit des cent villages (The conscript of 100 villages) written as an act of intellectual resistance in a clandestine manner in 1943.

== French Decorations ==

Croix de guerre 1914-1918: awarded on 1 March 1921.

== Administration ==
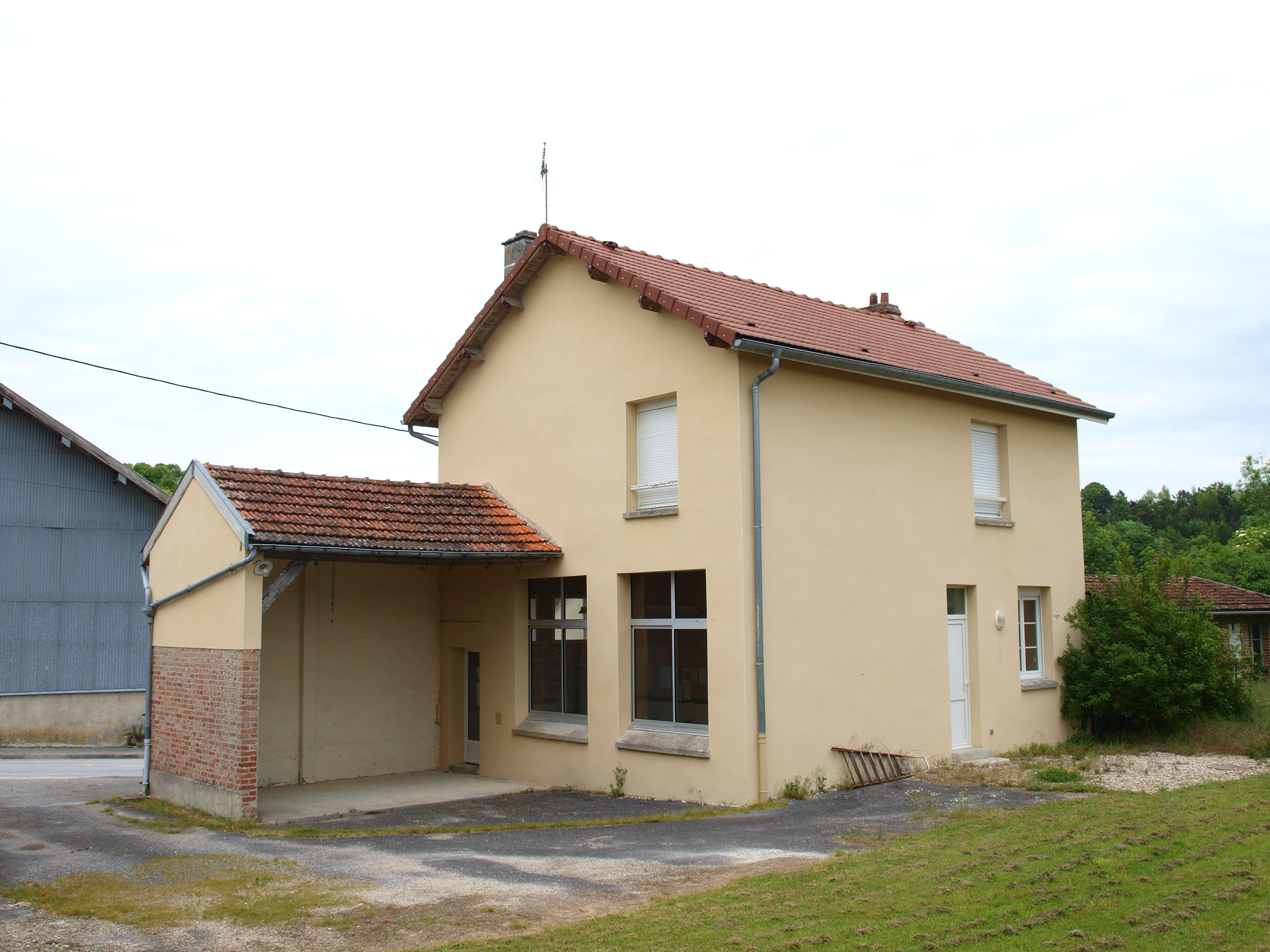
The town hall

List of Successive Mayors

From	To	Name
1995	2020	Michel Cartelet
2020	current	Cédric Nicolitch

== Demography ==
Historical population

Year	Pop.	±% p.a.
1793	131	—
1821	152	+0.53%
1846	167	+0.38%
1872	122	−1.20%
1901	106	−0.48%
1926	103	−0.11%
1946	105	+0.10%
1962	102	−0.18%
1968	89	−2.25%

Year	Pop.	±% p.a.
1975	74	−2.60%
1982	66	−1.62%
1990	56	−2.03%
1999	46	−2.16%
2007	62	+3.80%
2012	49	−4.60%
2017	48	−0.41%
2023	40	−2.99%

Source: EHESS and INSEE

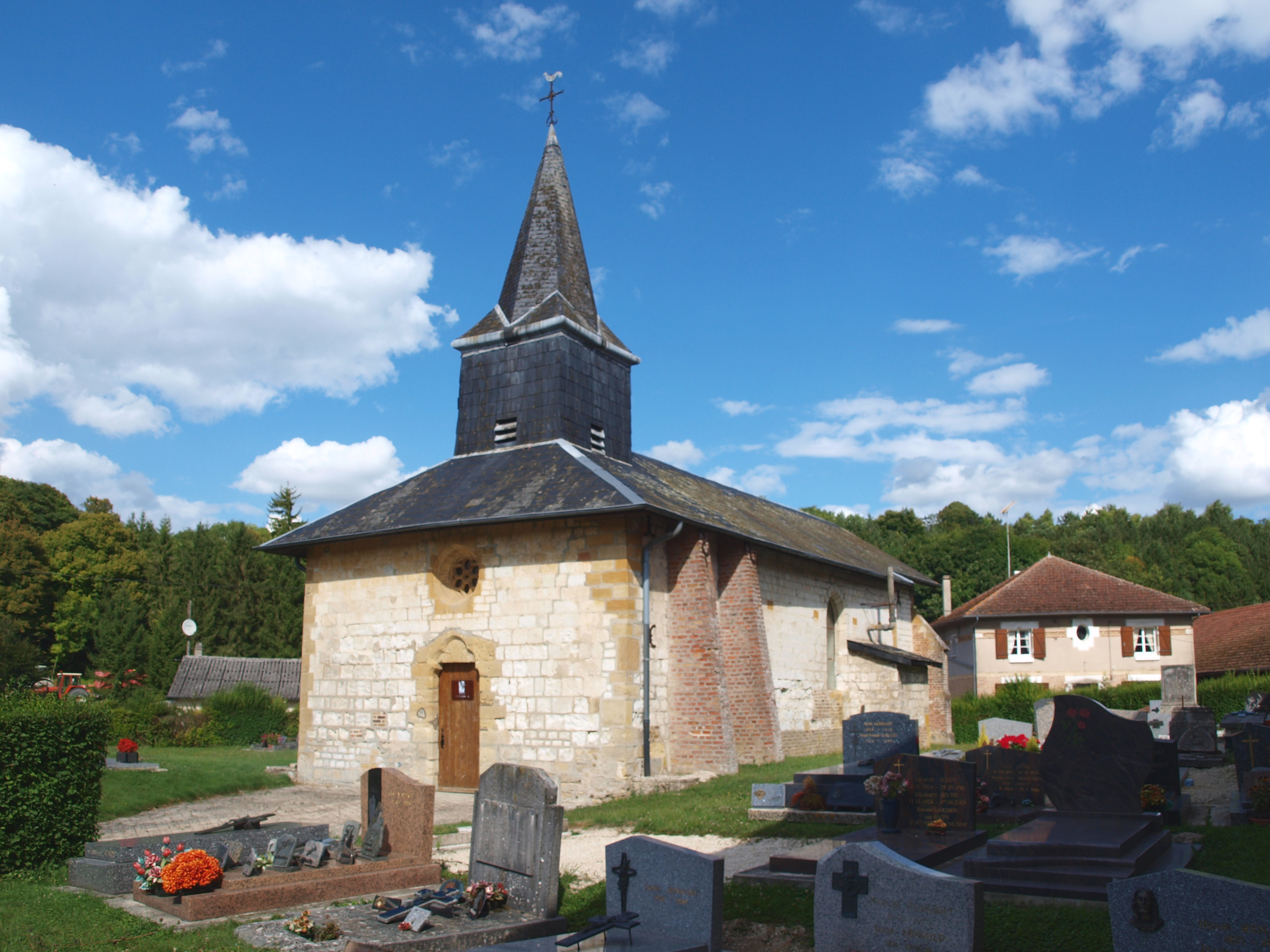
The church

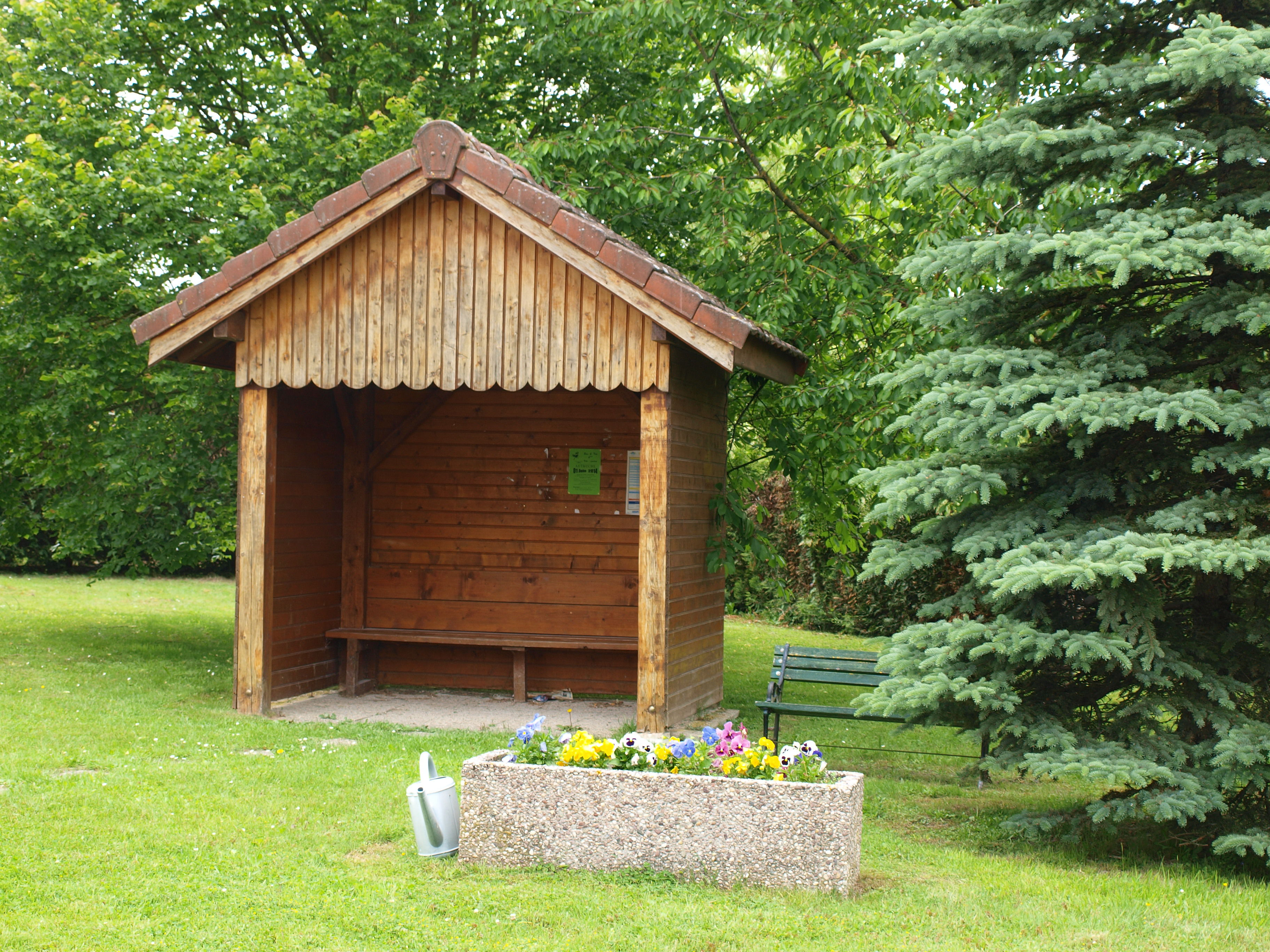
Bus stop

== Notable people linked to the commune ==
- Auguste Achile Baudart, Colonel of the 122nd Infantry Regiment of the Line, born in Aure on 16 November 1844 from a farming family, died at Montpellier on 15 December 1898.

== Photo gallery ==
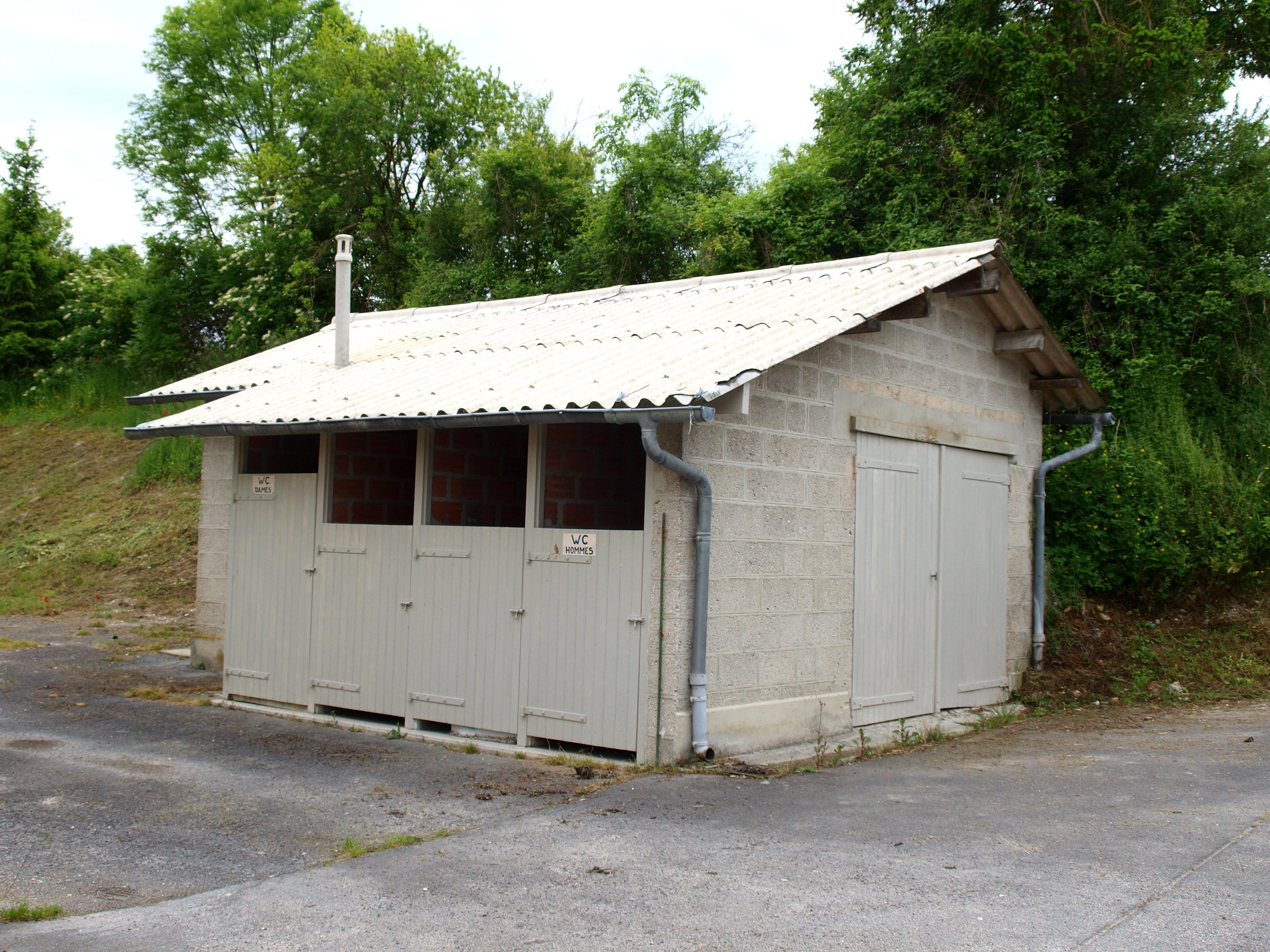
Public toilet

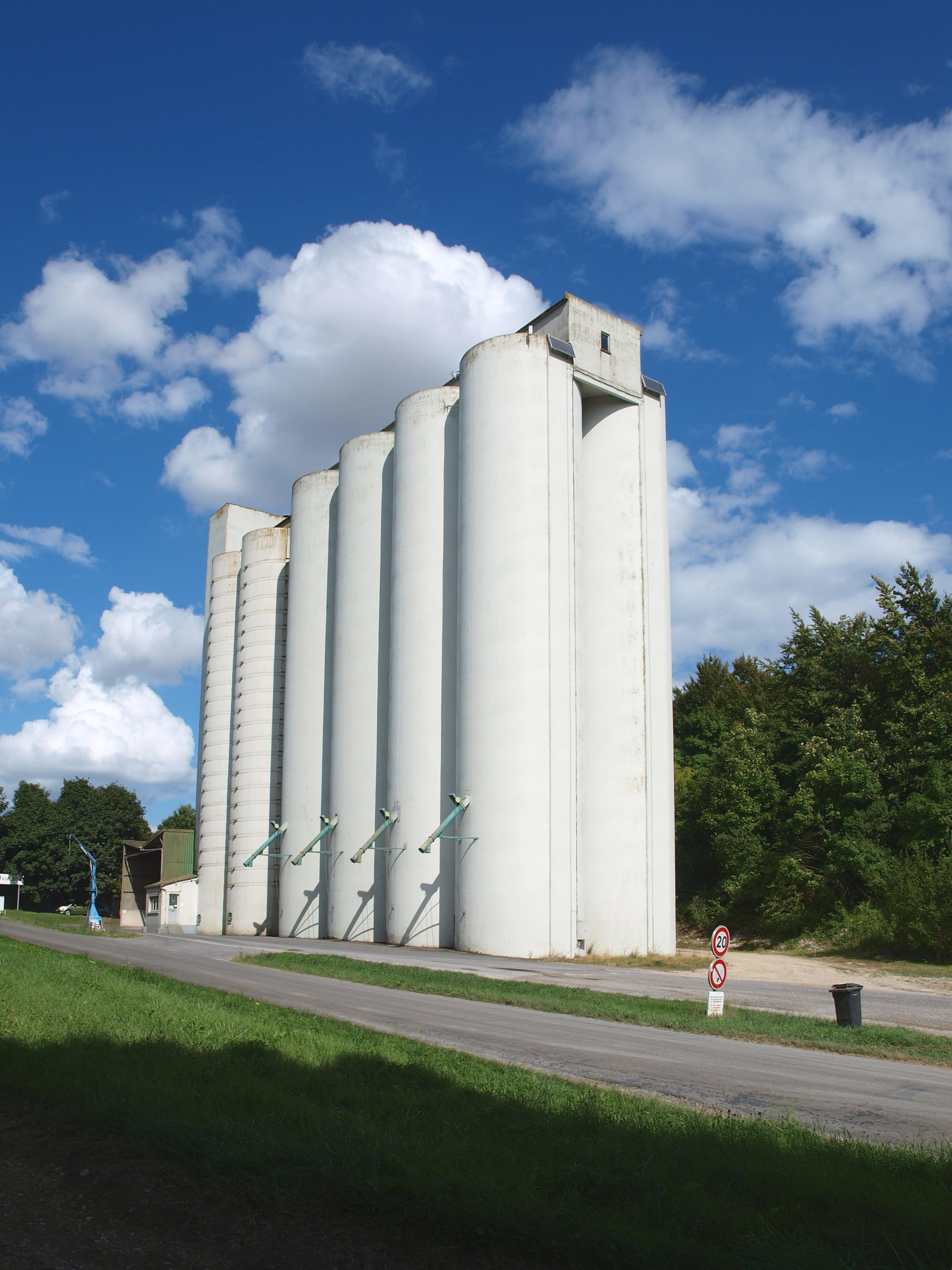
Grain Silo

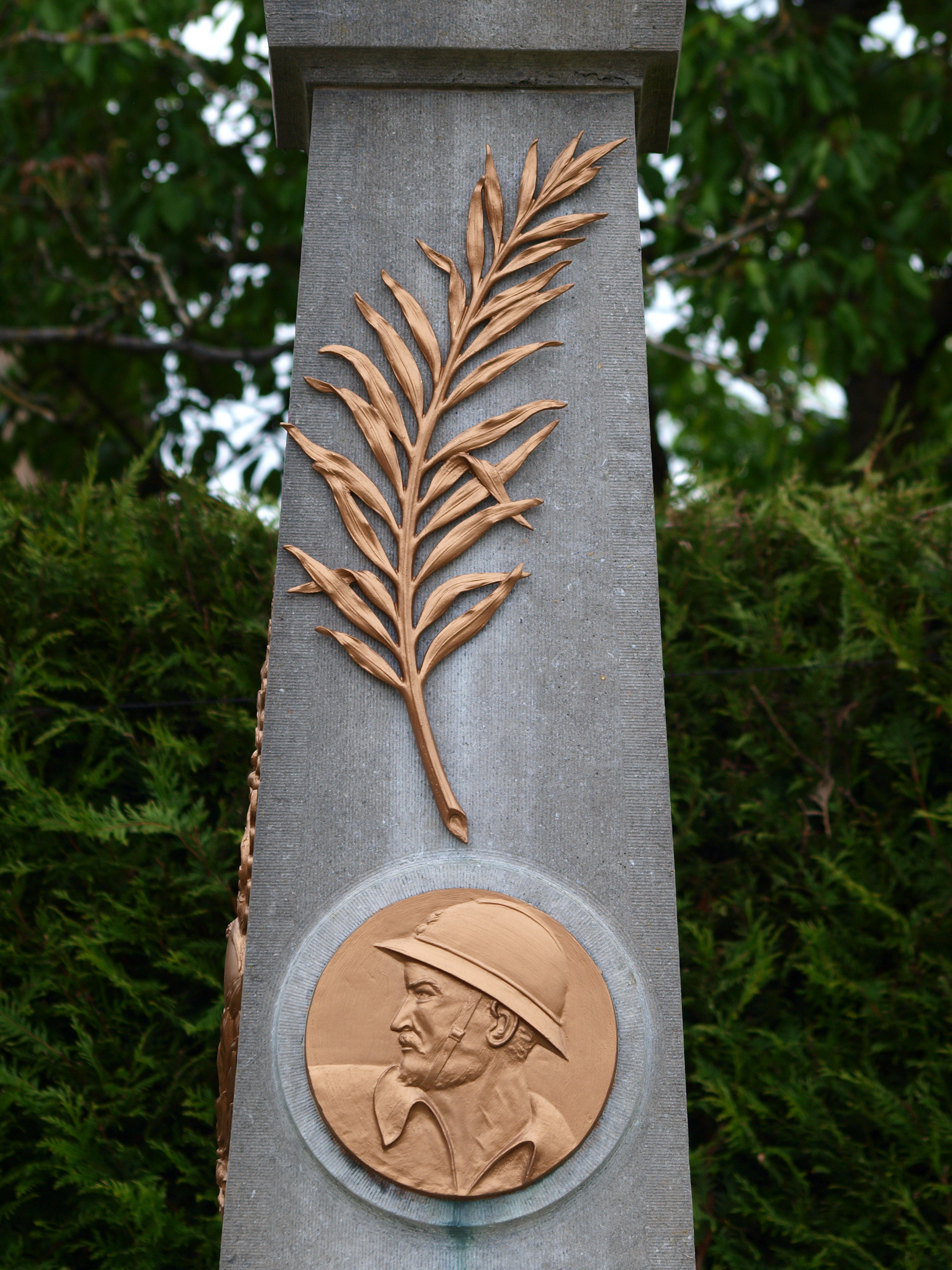
War memorial close-up

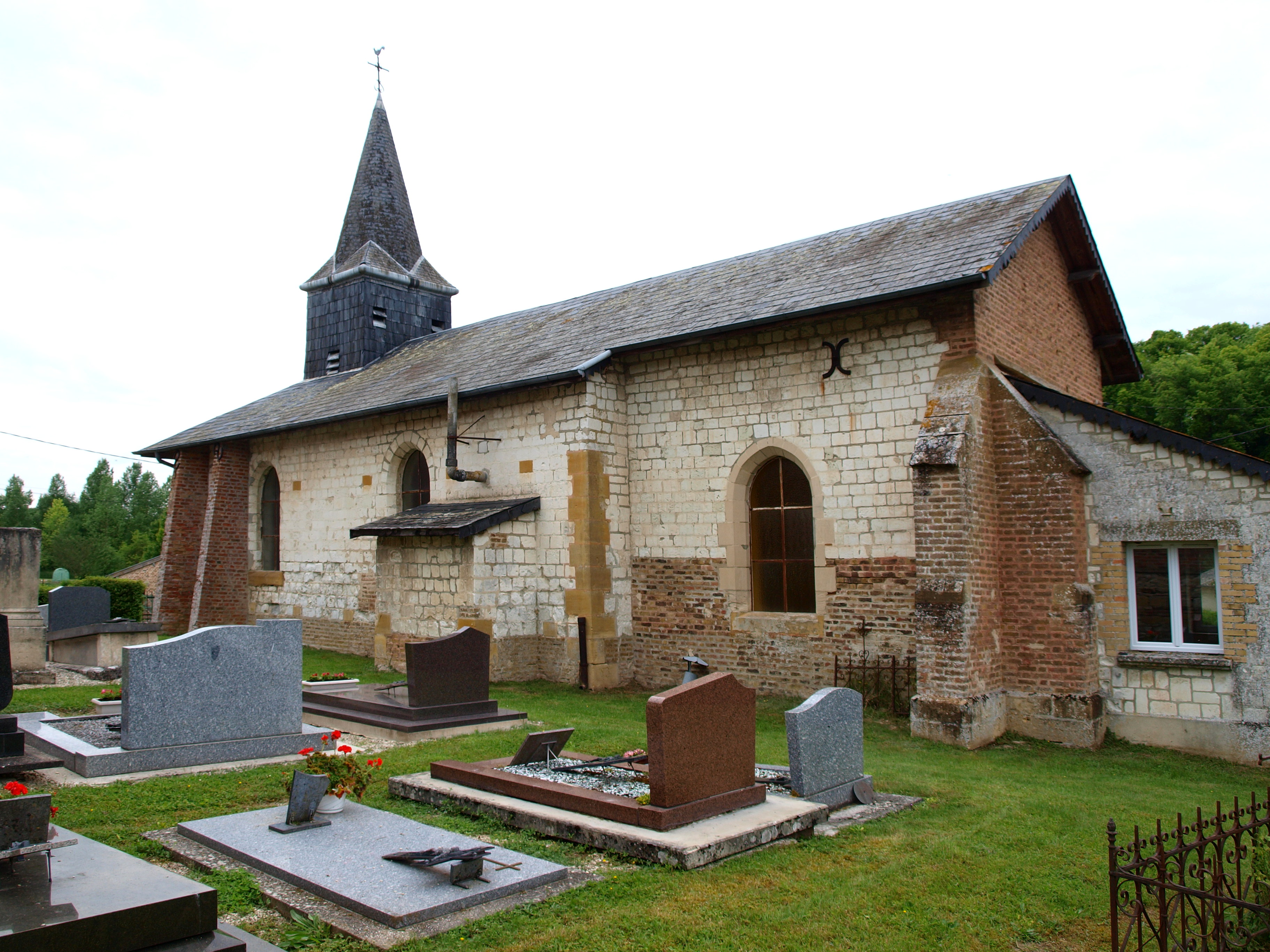
The church

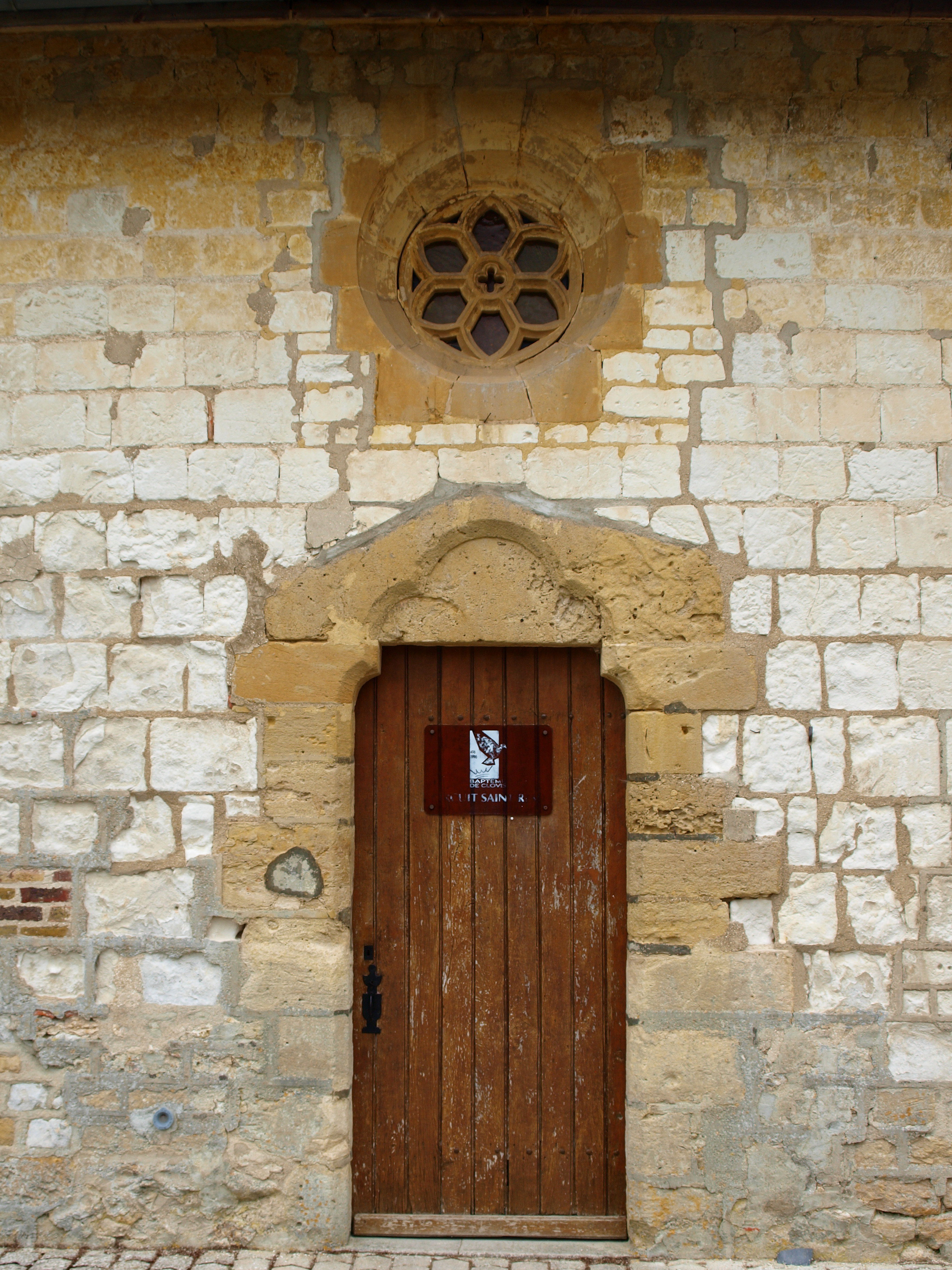
Entrance to the church

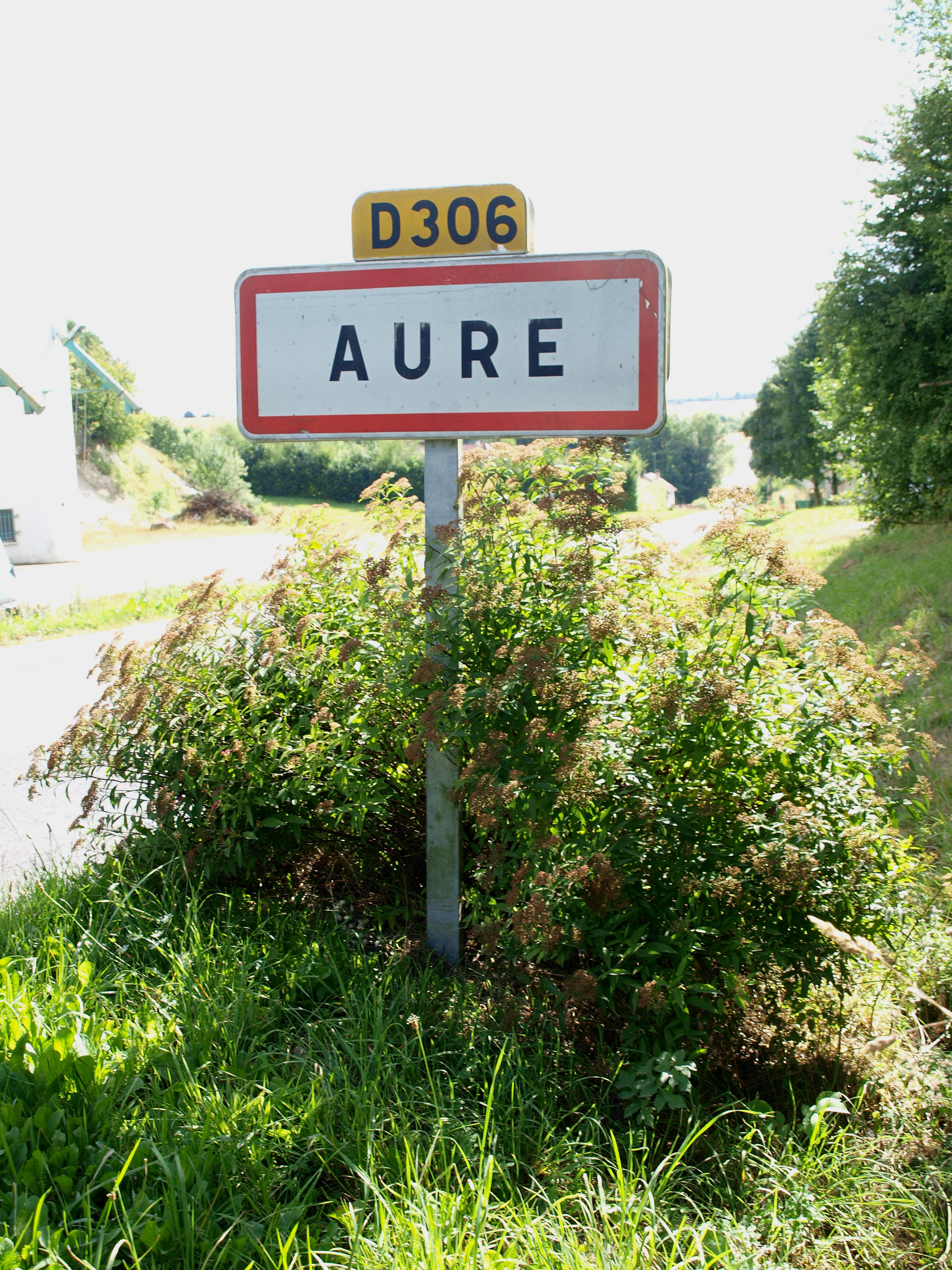
Entrance to the village

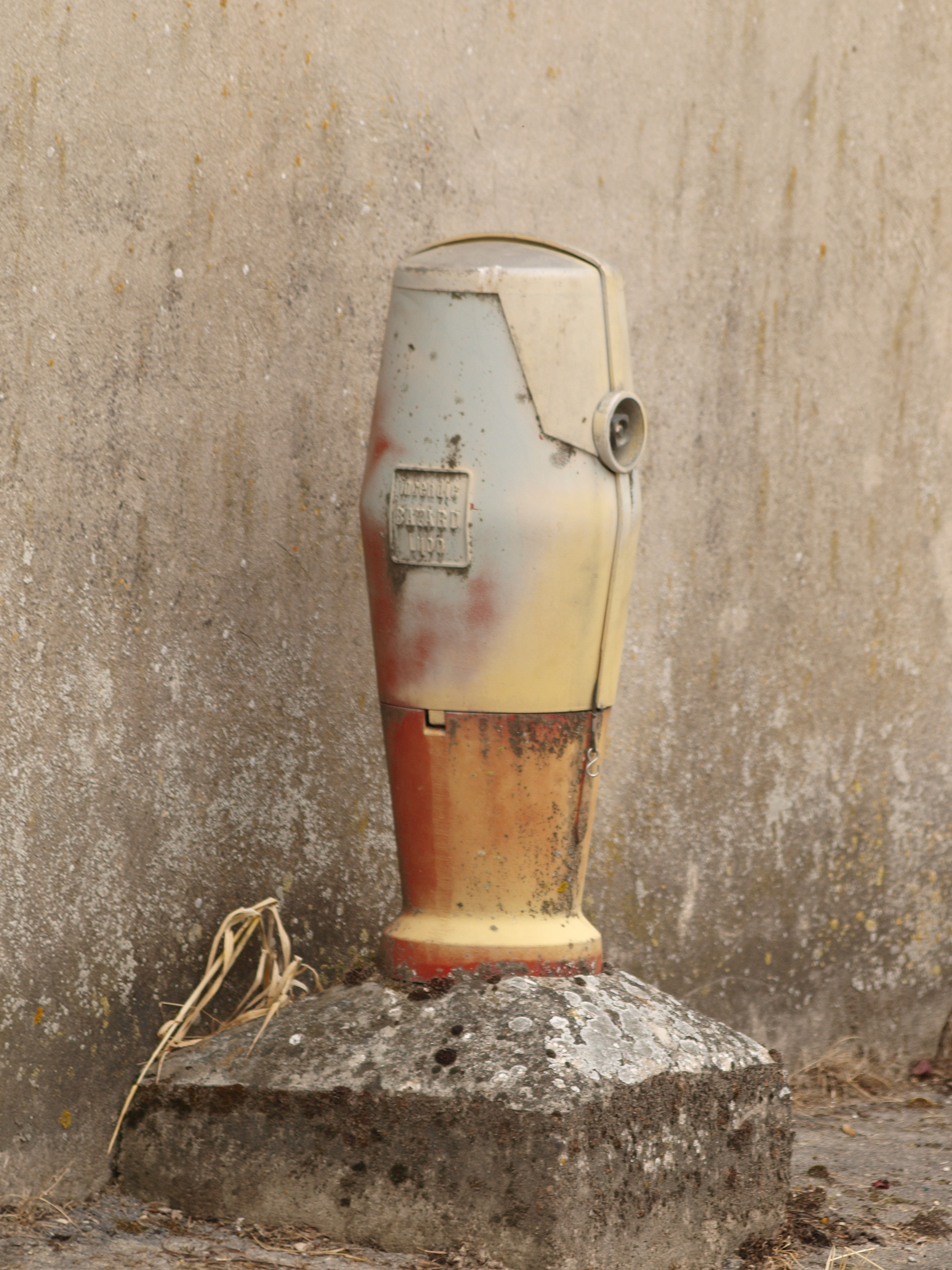
The Bomb

== See also ==
- Communes of the Ardennes department
