= Gregory Aure =

English politician

Gregory Aure (fl. 1406–1407) was an English politician. He sat as MP for Bath in 1406.
