= Canton of Novion-Porcien =

Former canton in Ardennes, France

Coordinates: 49°35′57″N 4°25′28″E

- Former canton
- Location of the canton in the arrondissement of Rethel
- Country: France
- Region: Grand Est
- Department: Ardennes
- No. of communes: {{{nbcomm}}}
- Disbanded: 2015

Government
  - Representatives: Jean-François Leclet
- Area: 224.16 km^{2} (86.55 sq mi)
- Population (2012): 5,185
  - Density: 23.13/km^{2} (59.91/sq mi)

The canton of Novion-Porcien (French: Canton de Novion-Porcien) is a former French canton located in the department of Ardennes in the Champagne-Ardenne region (now part of Grand Est). This canton was organized around Novion-Porcien in the arrondissement of Rethel.

The last general councillor from this canton was Jean-François Leclet (UDI), elected in 1992.

== Composition ==
The canton of Novion-Porcien grouped together twenty-three municipalities and had 5,185 inhabitants (2012 census without double counts).

1. Auboncourt-Vauzelles
2. Chesnois-Auboncourt
3. Corny-Machéroménil
4. Faissault
5. Faux
6. Grandchamp
7. Hagnicourt
8. Justine-Herbigny
9. Lucquy
10. Mesmont
11. La Neuville-lès-Wasigny
12. Neuvizy
13. Novion-Porcien
14. Puiseux
15. Saulces-Monclin
16. Sery
17. Sorcy-Bauthémont
18. Vaux-Montreuil
19. Viel-Saint-Remy
20. Villers-le-Tourneur
21. Wagnon
22. Wasigny
23. Wignicourt
