= Rocquigny =

Rocquigny is the name of several communes in France:

- Rocquigny, Aisne, in the Aisne département
- Rocquigny, Ardennes, in the Ardennes département
- Rocquigny, Pas-de-Calais, in the Pas-de-Calais département
