= Mesmont =

Mesmont may refer to the following places in France:

- Mesmont, Ardennes, a commune in the department of Ardennes
- Mesmont, Côte-d'Or, a commune in the department of Côte-d'Or
