= Banogne-Recouvrance =

- Commune
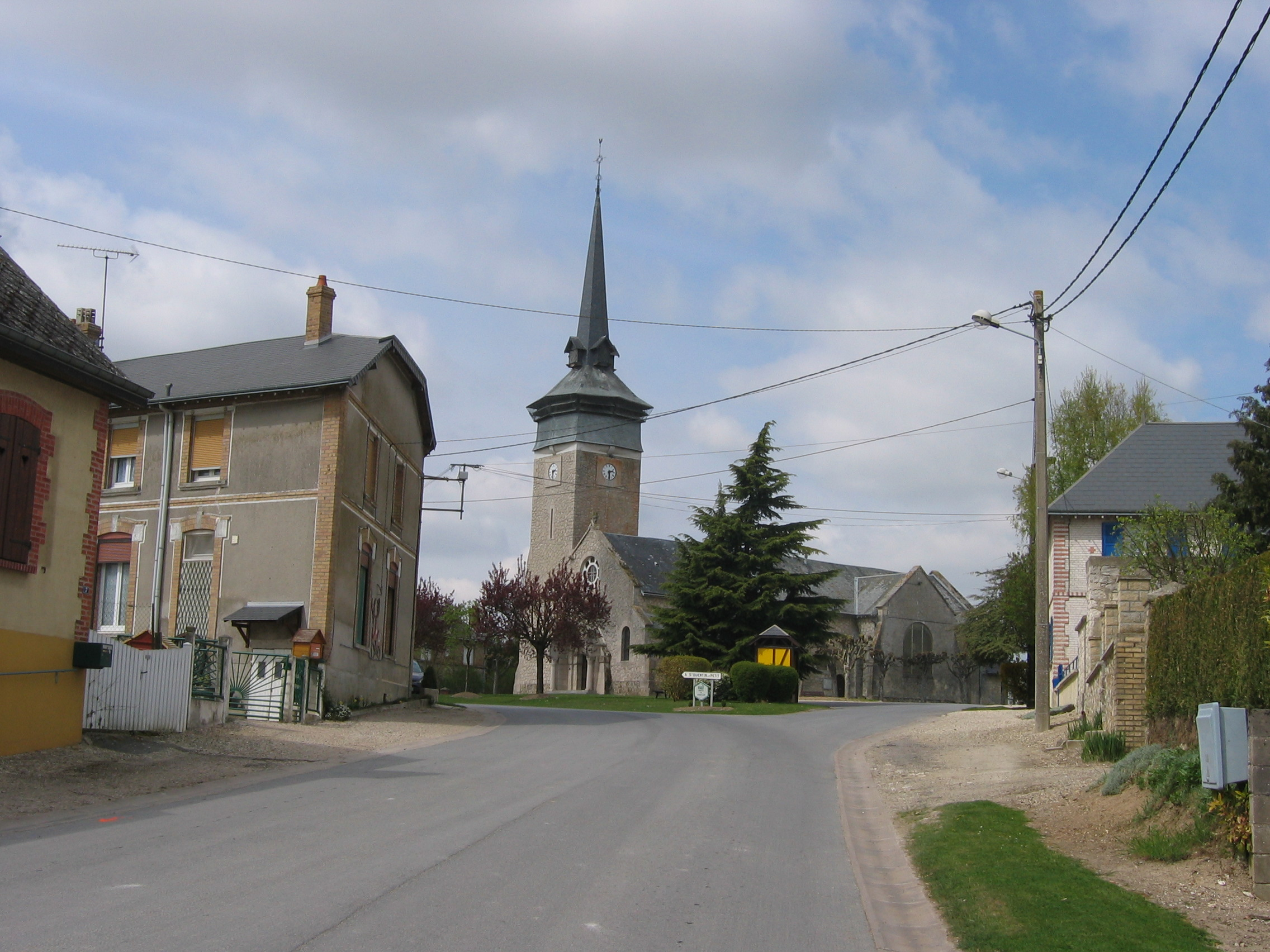
- The Village Centre

- Coat of arms
- Location of Banogne-Recouvrance
- Location within France Location within Grand Est
- Coordinates: 49°34′23″N 4°07′42″E
- Country: France
- Region: Grand Est
- Department: Ardennes
- Arrondissement: Rethel
- Canton: Château-Porcien
- Intercommunality: Pays rethélois

Government
  - Mayor (2020–2026): Cyril Carre
- Area^{1}: 19.01 km^{2} (7.34 sq mi)
- Elevation: 136 m (446 ft)
- Highest elevation: 162 m (531 ft)
- Lowest elevation: 80 m (260 ft)
- Population (2023): 162
  - Density: 8.52/km^{2} (22.1/sq mi)
- Time zone: UTC+01:00 (CET)
  - Summer (DST): UTC+02:00 (CEST)
- INSEE/Postal code: 08046 /08220
- ^{1} French Land Register data, which excludes lakes, ponds, glaciers > 1 km^{2} (0.386 sq mi or 247 acres) and river estuaries.

Banogne-Recouvrance (French pronunciation: [banɔɲ ʁəkuvʁɑ̃s]) is a commune in the Ardennes department in the Grand Est region of northern France.

== Geography ==
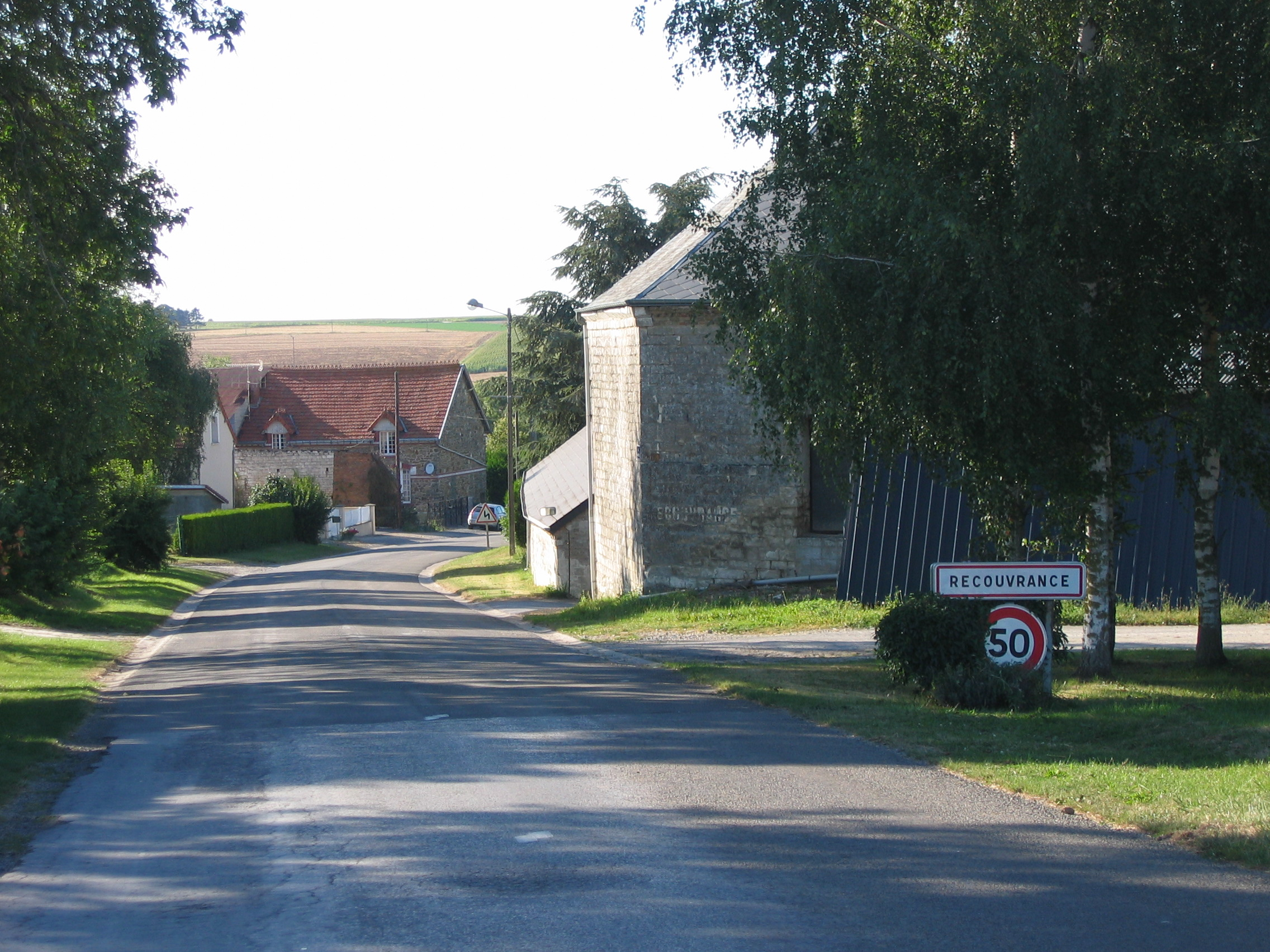
The Hamlet of Recouvrance

Banogne-Recouvrance is located some 20 km north-west of Rethel and 33 km east of Laon. Access to the commune is by the D30 road from Saint-Quentin-le-Petit in the north-west which passes through the centre of the commune and the village and continues south-east to Condé-lès-Herpy. The D35 goes from the village to Le Thour in the south-west. The D135 goes north from the village to join the D2 north of the commune. Apart from the village at the centre of the commune there is the hamlet of Recouvrance to the east. The commune is entirely farmland.

The writer Ernst Jünger remembered his passing through the village as a small village off the main roads, nestled in graceful chalk hills.

== History ==
The village is mentioned in cartularies of the 13th century.

In 1570 Banogne is described in the census as attached to the Parish of Thour whose barons and the Hotel Dieu de Reims share the land. A strong ditch surrounded Recouvrance providing a refuge for the inhabitants. A place called Ruisselois was the property of the Abbey of Signy then of the Jesuit college in Reims. A white chalk quarry is operated nearby.

In 1828 these villages were united into one commune with Banogne at the centre (with Le Ruisselois as a hamlet). Recouvrance also became a hamlet.

In 1918 the village was the site of fierce fighting during the Battle of St. Quentin Canal in the last weeks of the war. On 25 October the French army captured the heights of the commune and so seized the last stretch between Saint-Quentin and the Aisne valley of the system of German fortifications from La Fère to Rethel called the Hunding Stellung. Of the 125 houses in the town only 10 remained standing at the end of the fighting. The village and the church were rebuilt in the following decade.

=== Heraldry ===
Arms of Banogne-Recouvrance	Blazon: Party per pale Gules and Azure debruised by 3 blades of wheat of Or, in chief the same charged with 3 martlets of Sable.

== Administration ==
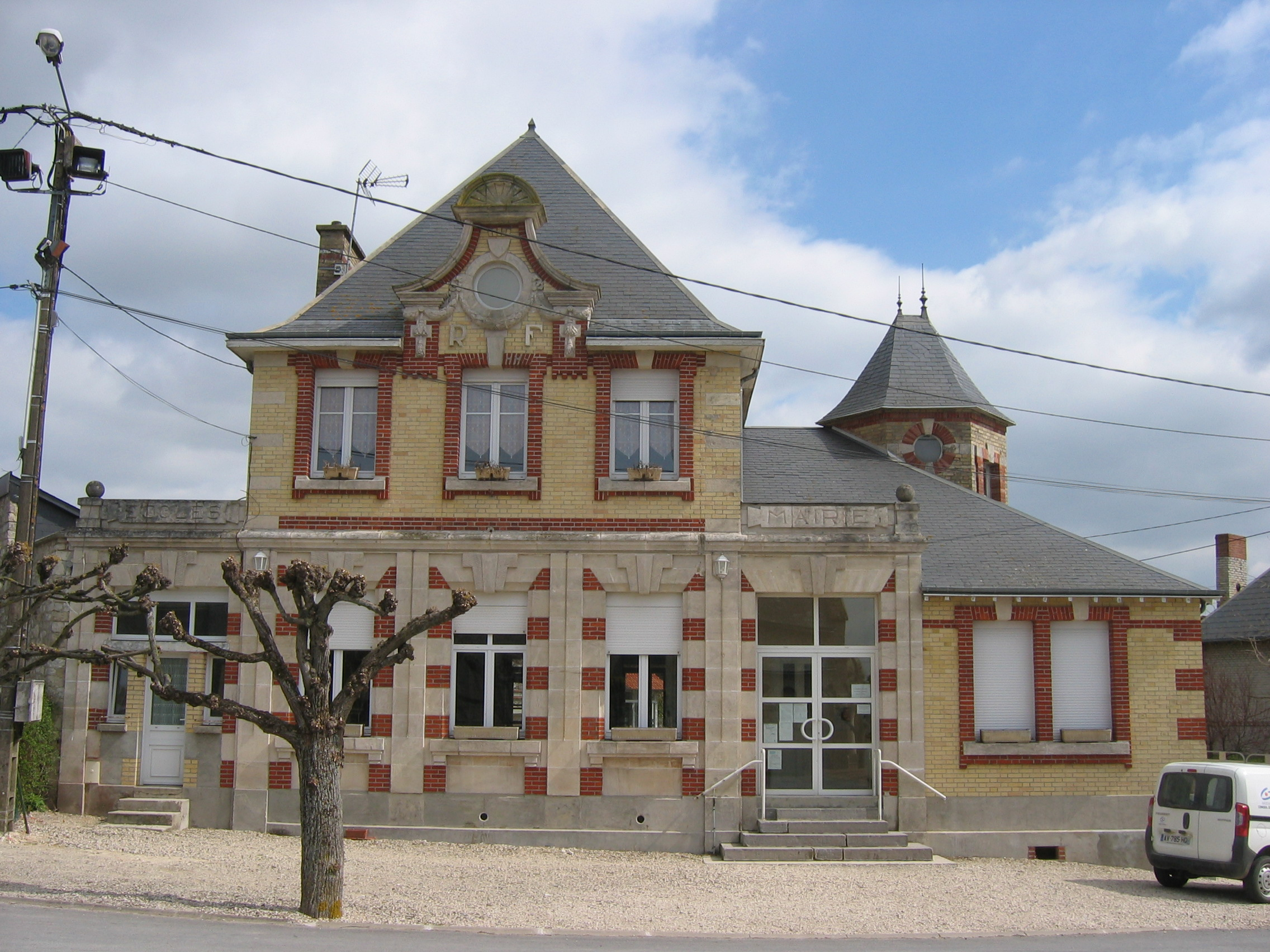
The Town Hall

List of Successive Mayors

From	To	Name
2001	2008	Sébastien Loriette
2008	2014	Alain Deparpe
2014	2020	Jean-Luc Guillaume
2020	2026	Cyril Carre

== Demography ==
The inhabitants of the commune are known as Banognais or Banognaises in French. The population data given in the table and graph below for 1821 and earlier refer to the former commune of Banogne.

Historical population

Year	Pop.	±% p.a.
1793	324	—
1821	368	+0.46%
1831	690	+6.49%
1846	715	+0.24%
1872	613	−0.59%
1901	536	−0.46%
1926	381	−1.36%
1946	260	−1.89%
1962	265	+0.12%

Year	Pop.	±% p.a.
1968	216	−3.35%
1975	194	−1.52%
1982	166	−2.20%
1990	128	−3.20%
1999	139	+0.92%
2007	154	+1.29%
2012	165	+1.39%
2017	157	−0.99%
2023	162	+0.52%

Source: EHESS and INSEE

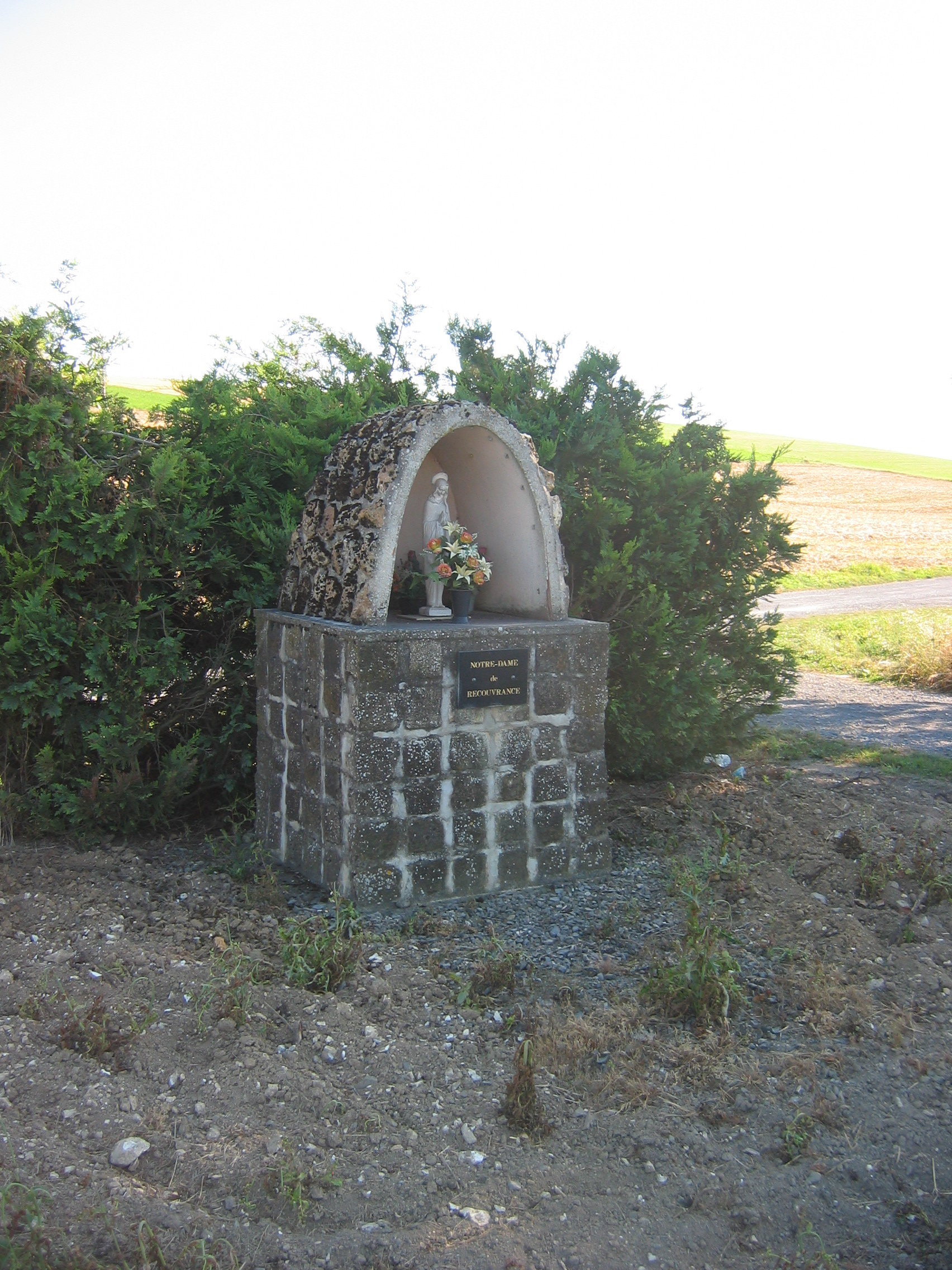
An Oratory at Recouvrance

== Sites and monuments ==
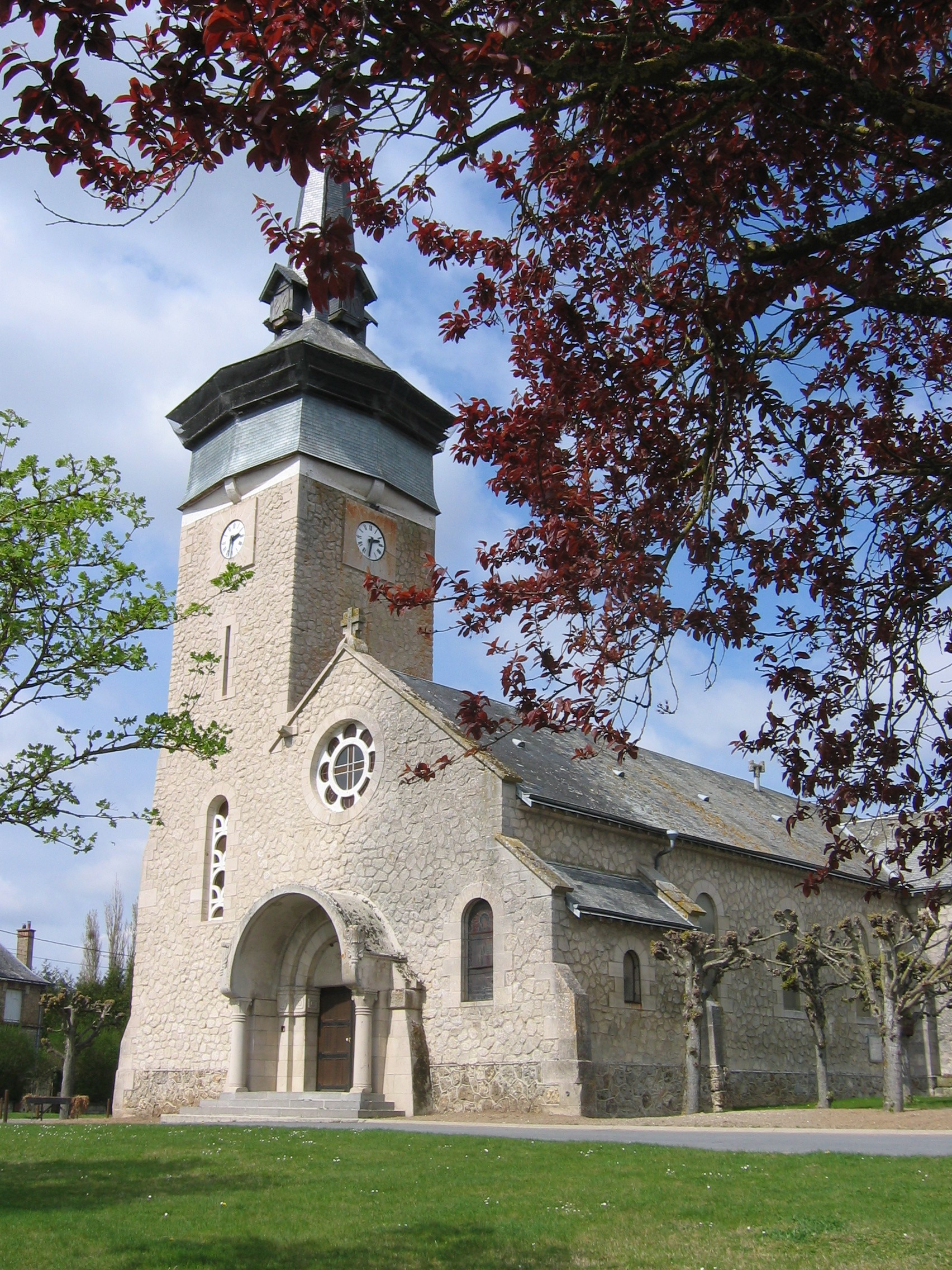
The Church

- A Church rebuilt after the First World War.

== Notable people linked to the commune ==
- Ernst Jünger, German writer, he stayed in the hamlet of Recouvrance when he was a young soldier. This hamlet was slightly behind the front (on the German side) in early 1915 and served as a training area. Ernst Jünger devoted several pages to his stay, which preceded his engagement at the front, in his journal Storm of Steel.

== See also ==
- Communes of the Ardennes department
