= Alincourt =

- Commune
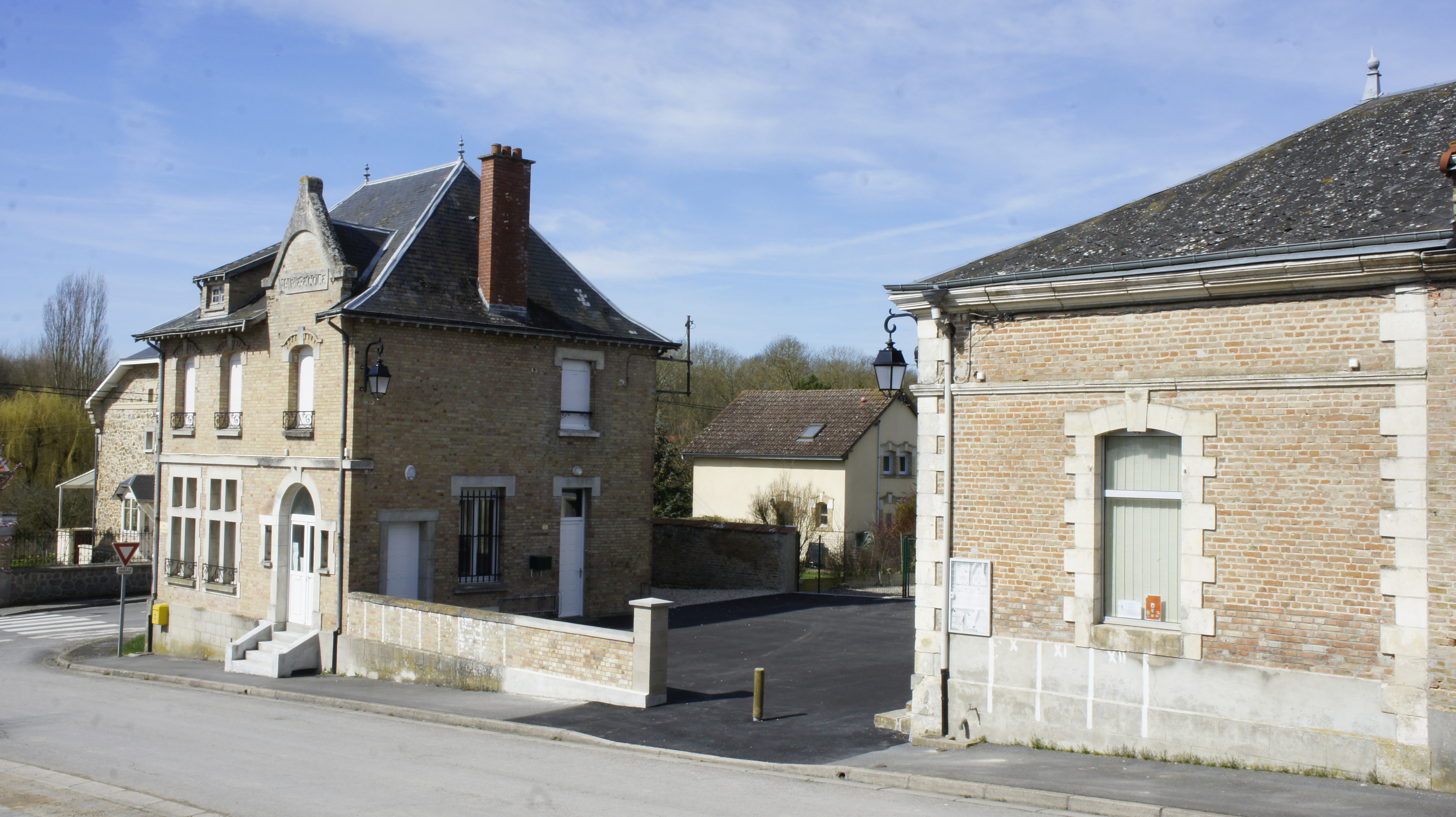
- The Town Hall

- Coat of arms
- Location of Alincourt
- Location within France Location within Grand Est
- Coordinates: 49°24′16″N 4°20′45″E
- Country: France
- Region: Grand Est
- Department: Ardennes
- Arrondissement: Rethel
- Canton: Château-Porcien
- Intercommunality: Pays Rethélois

Government
  - Mayor (2020–2026): Nicolas Etique
- Area^{1}: 8.62 km^{2} (3.33 sq mi)
- Elevation: 102 m (335 ft)
- Highest elevation: 141 m (463 ft)
- Lowest elevation: 83 m (272 ft)
- Population (2023): 160
  - Density: 19/km^{2} (48/sq mi)
- Time zone: UTC+01:00 (CET)
  - Summer (DST): UTC+02:00 (CEST)
- INSEE/Postal code: 08005 /08310
- ^{1} French Land Register data, which excludes lakes, ponds, glaciers > 1 km^{2} (0.386 sq mi or 247 acres) and river estuaries.

Alincourt (French pronunciation: [alɛ̃kuʁ]) is a commune in the Ardennes department in the Grand Est region of northern France.

== Geography ==
Alincourt is located some 15 km south of Rethel and 25 km north-east of Rheims. It can be accessed on the D925 road from Neuflize in the west passing through the heart of the commune and the village and continuing east to Juniville. The D985 road from Perthes in the north also passes through the north-west of the commune and continues to join the D925 west of Juniville. The commune consists entirely of farmland other than a strip of forest along the banks of the river.

The Retourne river flows through the commune from east to west passing just south of the village and continuing west until it joins the Aisne at Neufchatel-sur-Aisne.

== Administration ==
List of Successive Mayors

From	To	Name
1833	1837	Paul Damien Hainguerlot
1837	1841	Jean Paul Hainguerlot
1841	1842	Noêl Flandre
1983	2001	Hilaire Flandre
2001	2008	Claude Olette
2008	2020	Joël de Carlini
2020	Present	Nicolas Etique

== Population ==
The inhabitants of the commune are known as Alincourtois or Alincourtoises in French.

Historical population
Year	Pop.	±% p.a.
1968	85	—
1975	79	−1.04%
1982	86	+1.22%
1990	91	+0.71%
1999	78	−1.70%
2007	114	+4.86%
2012	146	+5.07%
2017	150	+0.54%
2023	160	+1.08%
Source: INSEE

== Sites and Monuments ==
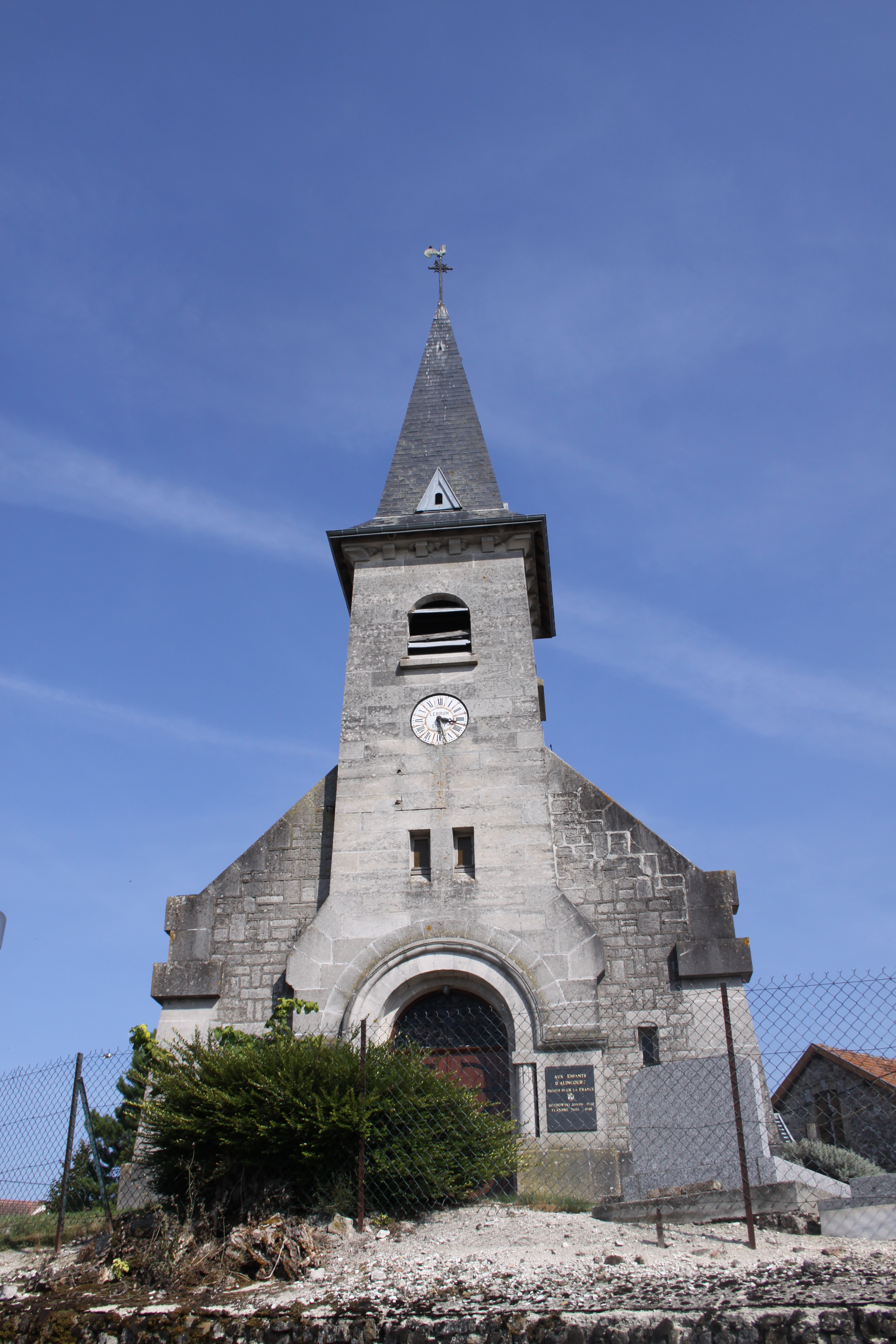
Saint Hilaire church

- The Church of Saint-Hilaire has the epitaph: "to ... Sir Regnaut Feret living knight and Lord of Alincourt Captain of the Regiment of Maine deceased at Bar-le-Duc buried in the Church of Sainte Macre on 16 July 1697 ... Charged in perpetuity to say a High Mass and a vigil at the hour of his decease ... to buy ornaments for the Alincourt church, the place of burial of his father and ancestors" inscribed on black marble on the right side of the choir. On the left side is ... "Sir Jean Claude de Cugnon, Knight and Lord of Alincourt, Branscourt Sorbon, and Arnicourt was buried in this church on 10 September 1775" ... on black marble.
- The Chateau of Alincourt

=== Picture Gallery ===
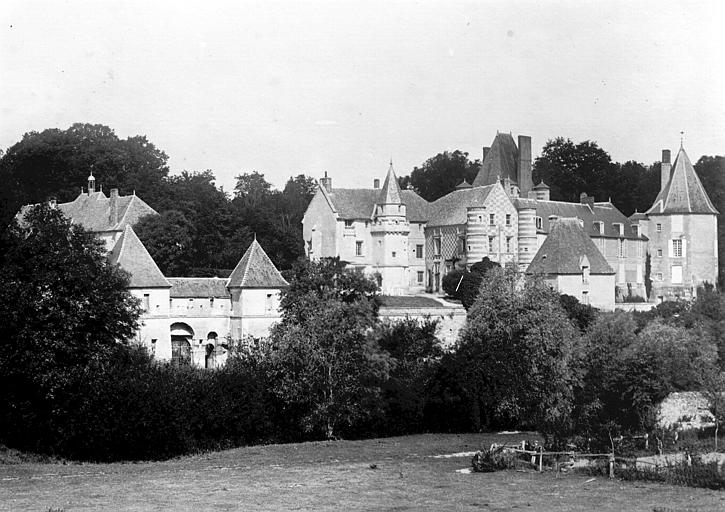
Chateau of Alincourt

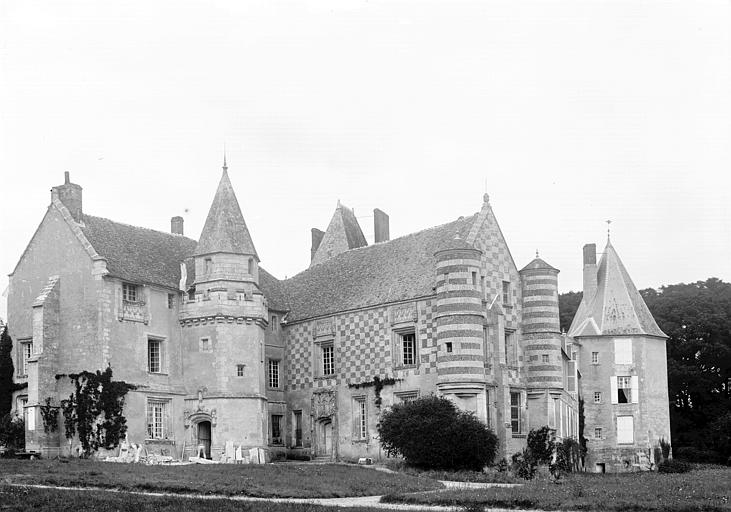
Chateau of Alincourt

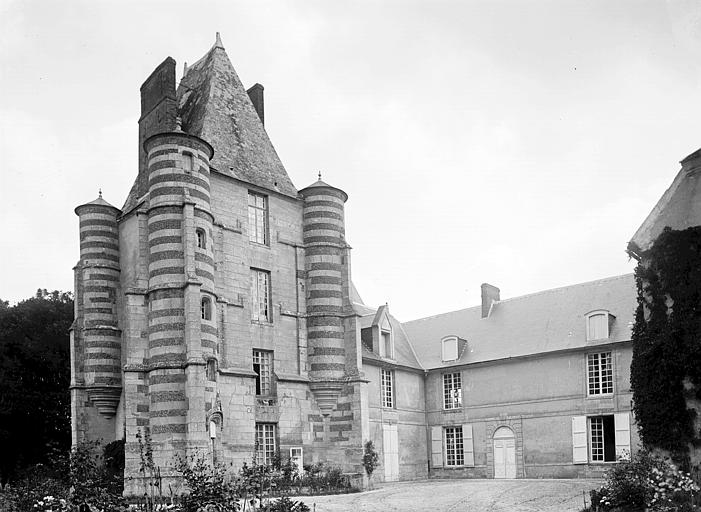
Tower of the Chateau

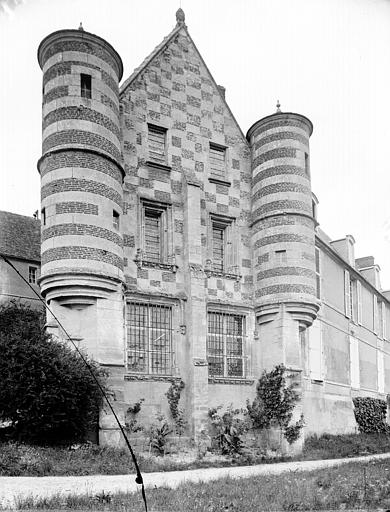

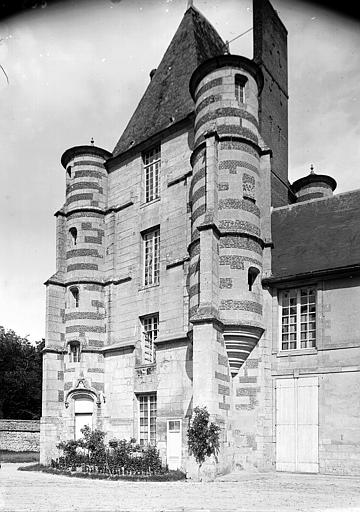

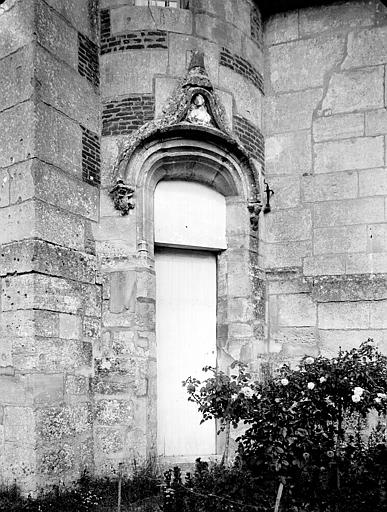
Chateau entrance

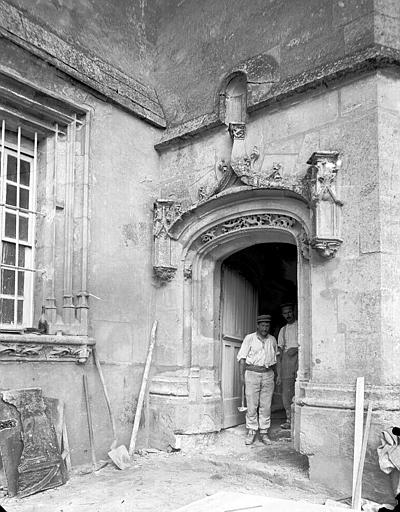

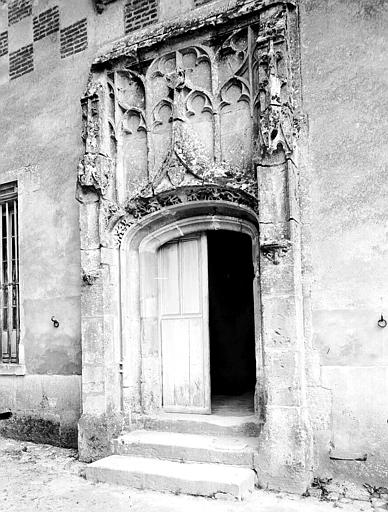

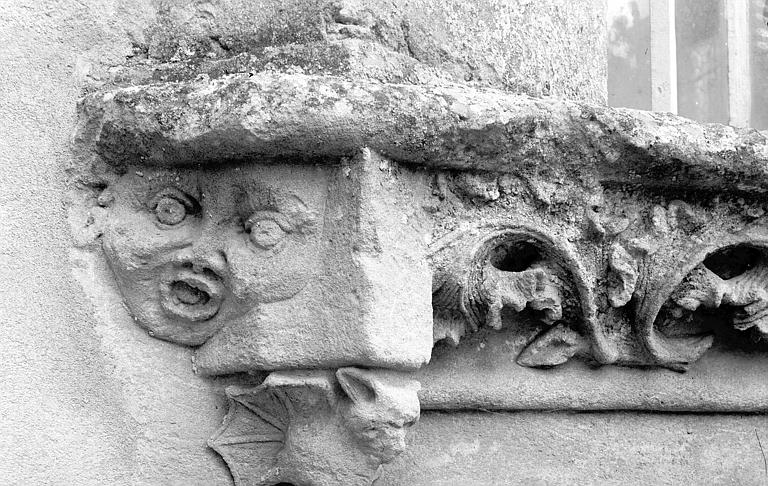
Chateau detail

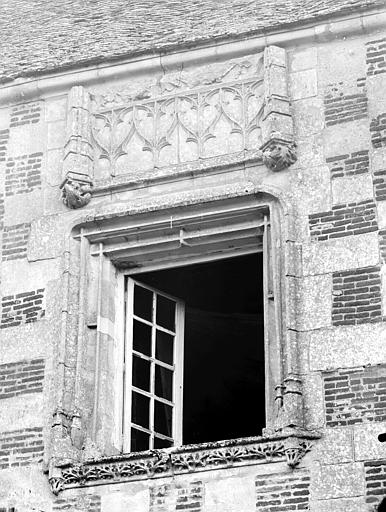
Chateau window

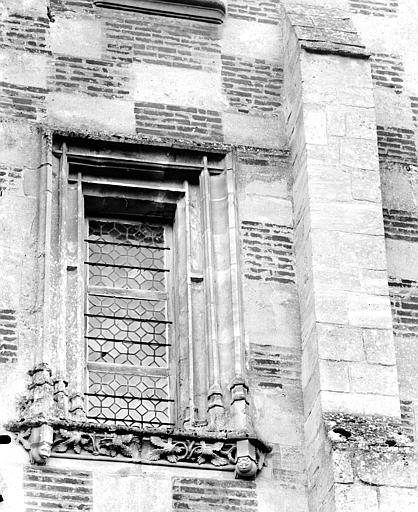

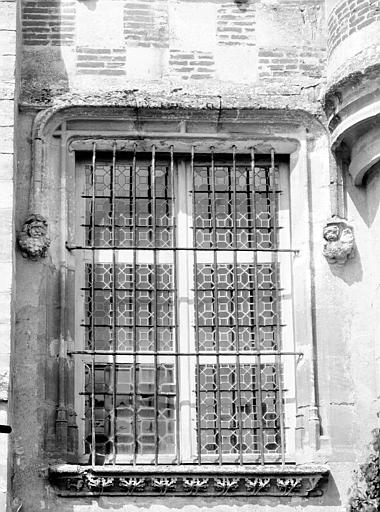

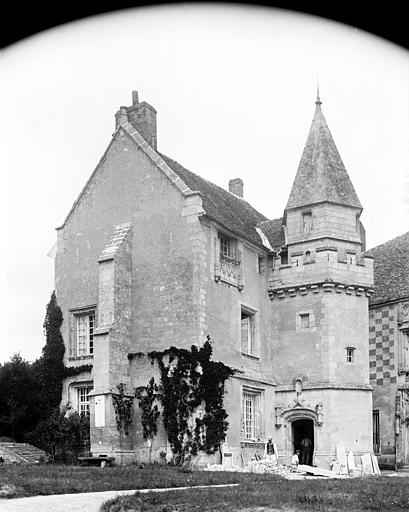

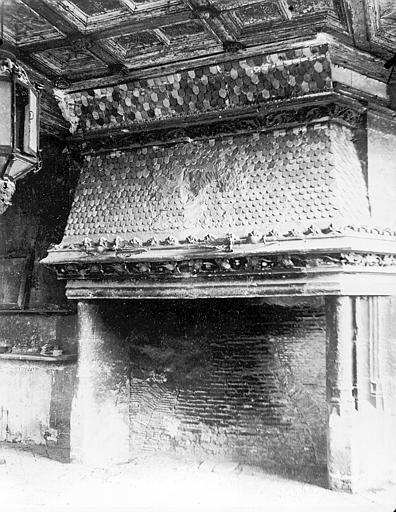
Chateau interior

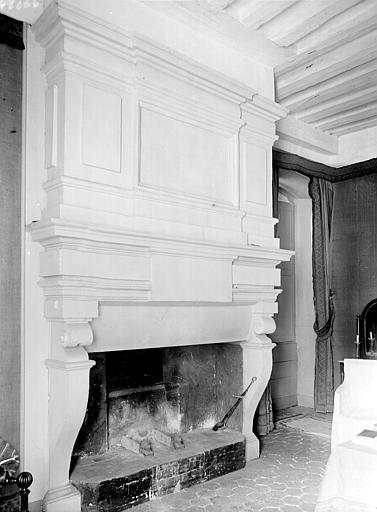

== Notable people linked to the commune ==
- Hilaire Flandre (1937-2004), born in Alincourt Mayor of Alincourt, Regional Councillor then Senator for Champagne-Ardenne.

== See also ==
- Communes of the Ardennes department
