= La Romagne =

La Romagne is the name of the following communes in France:

- La Romagne, Ardennes, in the Ardennes department
- La Romagne, Maine-et-Loire, in the Maine-et-Loire department
