= Arrondissement of Rethel =

Coordinates: 49.52°N 4.37°E

Rethel
- Arrondissement
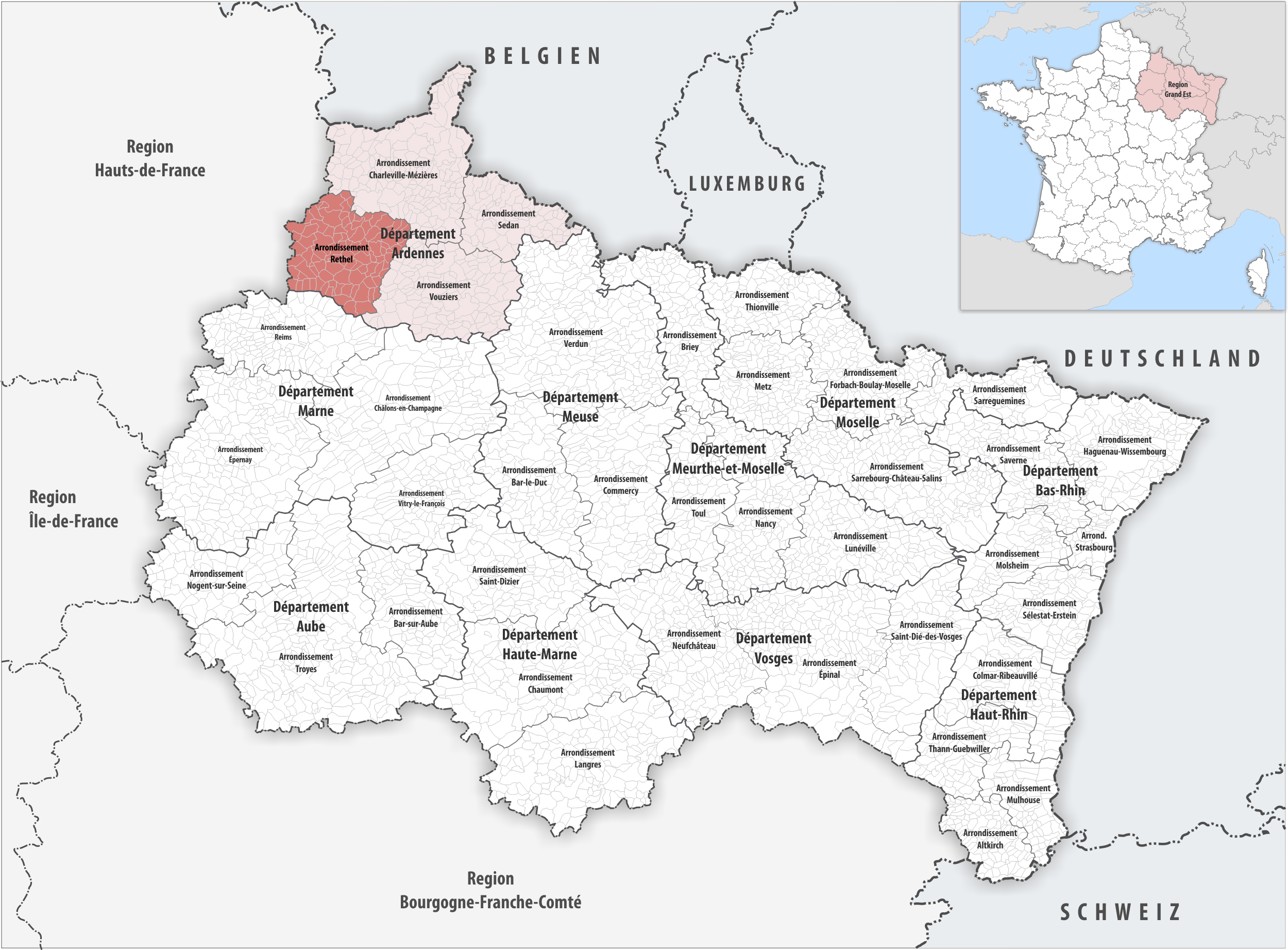
- Location within the region Grand Est
- Country: France
- Region: Grand Est
- Department: Ardennes
- No. of communes: {{{nbcomm}}}
- Area: 1,199.7 km^{2} (463.2 sq mi)
- Population (2023): 37,147
  - Density: 30.964/km^{2} (80.195/sq mi)
- INSEE code: 082

The arrondissement of Rethel is an arrondissement of France in the Ardennes department in the Grand Est region. It has 101 communes. Its population is 37,339 (2021), and its area is 1,199.7 km^{2} (463.2 sq mi).

== Composition ==
The communes of the arrondissement of Rethel, and their INSEE codes, are:

1. Acy-Romance (08001)
2. Aire (08004)
3. Alincourt (08005)
4. Amagne (08008)
5. Ambly-Fleury (08010)
6. Annelles (08014)
7. Arnicourt (08021)
8. Asfeld (08024)
9. Auboncourt-Vauzelles (08027)
10. Aussonce (08032)
11. Avançon (08038)
12. Avaux (08039)
13. Balham (08044)
14. Banogne-Recouvrance (08046)
15. Barby (08048)
16. Bergnicourt (08060)
17. Bertoncourt (08062)
18. Biermes (08064)
19. Bignicourt (08066)
20. Blanzy-la-Salonnaise (08070)
21. Brienne-sur-Aisne (08084)
22. Chappes (08102)
23. Château-Porcien (08107)
24. Le Châtelet-sur-Retourne (08111)
25. Chaumont-Porcien (08113)
26. Chesnois-Auboncourt (08117)
27. Condé-lès-Herpy (08126)
28. Corny-Machéroménil (08132)
29. Coucy (08133)
30. Doumely-Bégny (08143)
31. Doux (08144)
32. Draize (08146)
33. L'Écaille (08148)
34. Écly (08150)
35. Faissault (08163)
36. Faux (08165)
37. Fraillicourt (08178)
38. Givron (08192)
39. Gomont (08195)
40. Grandchamp (08196)
41. Hagnicourt (08205)
42. Hannogne-Saint-Rémy (08210)
43. Hauteville (08219)
44. Herpy-l'Arlésienne (08225)
45. Houdilcourt (08229)
46. Inaumont (08234)
47. Juniville (08239)
48. Justine-Herbigny (08240)
49. Lucquy (08262)
50. Ménil-Annelles (08286)
51. Ménil-Lépinois (08287)
52. Mesmont (08288)
53. Mont-Laurent (08306)
54. Montmeillant (08307)
55. Nanteuil-sur-Aisne (08313)
56. Neuflize (08314)
57. La Neuville-en-Tourne-à-Fuy (08320)
58. La Neuville-lès-Wasigny (08323)
59. Neuvizy (08324)
60. Novion-Porcien (08329)
61. Novy-Chevrières (08330)
62. Perthes (08339)
63. Poilcourt-Sydney (08340)
64. Puiseux (08348)
65. Remaucourt (08356)
66. Renneville (08360)
67. Rethel (08362)
68. Rocquigny (08366)
69. Roizy (08368)
70. La Romagne (08369)
71. Rubigny (08372)
72. Saint-Fergeux (08380)
73. Saint-Germainmont (08381)
74. Saint-Jean-aux-Bois (08382)
75. Saint-Loup-en-Champagne (08386)
76. Saint-Quentin-le-Petit (08396)
77. Saint-Remy-le-Petit (08397)
78. Saulces-Monclin (08402)
79. Sault-lès-Rethel (08403)
80. Sault-Saint-Remy (08404)
81. Seraincourt (08413)
82. Sery (08415)
83. Seuil (08416)
84. Sévigny-Waleppe (08418)
85. Son (08426)
86. Sorbon (08427)
87. Sorcy-Bauthémont (08428)
88. Tagnon (08435)
89. Taizy (08438)
90. Le Thour (08451)
91. Thugny-Trugny (08452)
92. Vaux-lès-Rubigny (08465)
93. Vaux-Montreuil (08467)
94. Viel-Saint-Remy (08472)
95. Vieux-lès-Asfeld (08473)
96. Villers-devant-le-Thour (08476)
97. Villers-le-Tourneur (08479)
98. Ville-sur-Retourne (08484)
99. Wagnon (08496)
100. Wasigny (08499)
101. Wignicourt (08500)

== History ==
The arrondissement of Rethel was created in 1800.

As a result of the reorganisation of the cantons of France which came into effect in 2015, the borders of the cantons are no longer related to the borders of the arrondissements. The cantons of the arrondissement of Rethel were, as of January 2015:

1. Asfeld
2. Château-Porcien
3. Chaumont-Porcien
4. Juniville
5. Novion-Porcien
6. Rethel
