= Auboncourt-Vauzelles =

Commune in Ardennes, Grand Est, France

- Commune
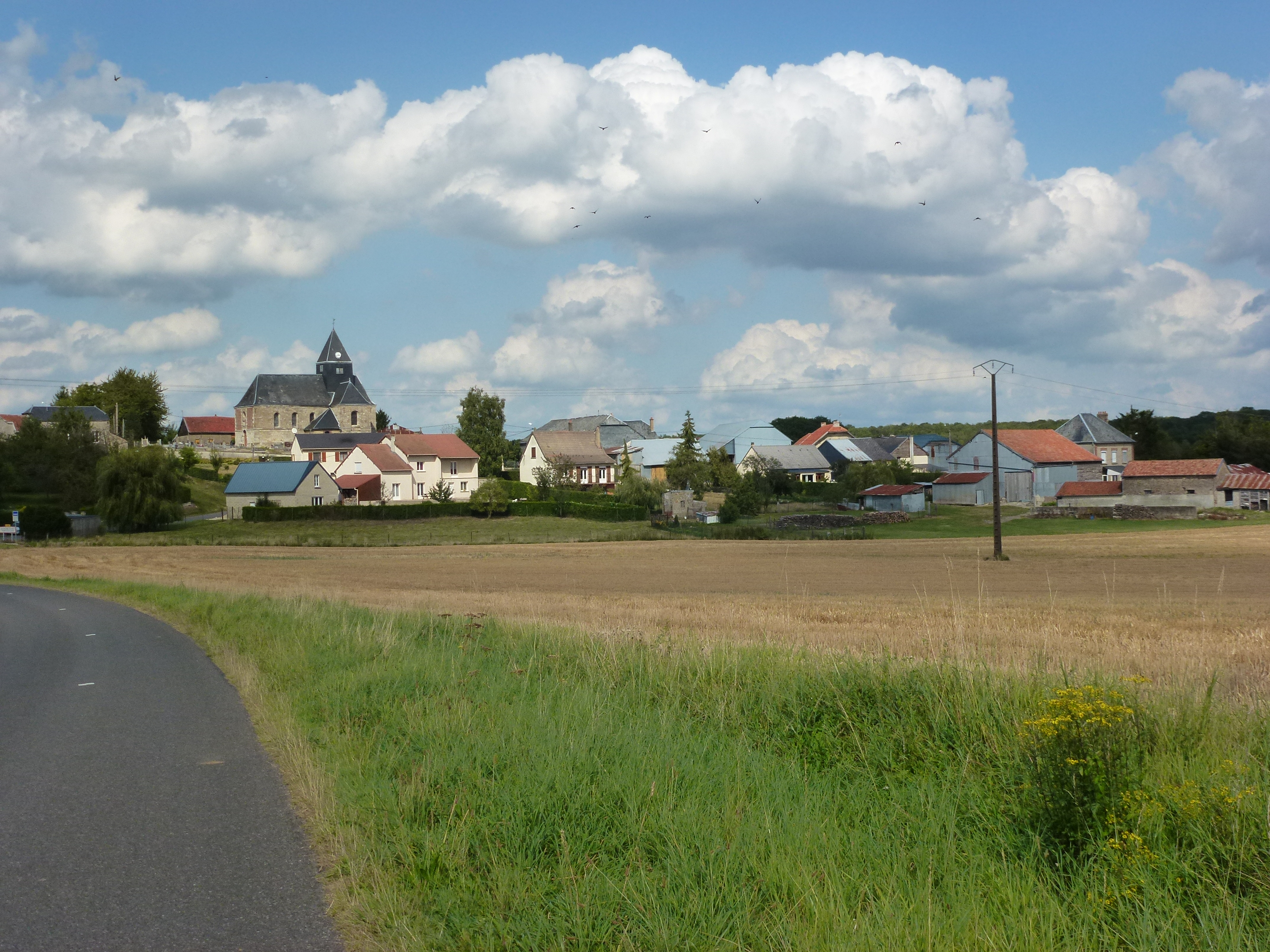
- View of the Village
- Location of Auboncourt-Vauzelles
- Location within France Location within Grand Est
- Coordinates: 49°33′10″N 4°29′38″E
- Country: France
- Region: Grand Est
- Department: Ardennes
- Arrondissement: Rethel
- Canton: Signy-l'Abbaye
- Intercommunality: CC Crêtes Préardennaises

Government
  - Mayor (2020–2026): Benoît Carier
- Area^{1}: 5.4 km^{2} (2.1 sq mi)
- Elevation: 98 m (322 ft)
- Highest elevation: 127 m (417 ft)
- Lowest elevation: 86 m (282 ft)
- Population (2023): 95
  - Density: 18/km^{2} (46/sq mi)
- Time zone: UTC+01:00 (CET)
  - Summer (DST): UTC+02:00 (CEST)
- INSEE/Postal code: 08027 /08270
- ^{1} French Land Register data, which excludes lakes, ponds, glaciers > 1 km^{2} (0.386 sq mi or 247 acres) and river estuaries.

Auboncourt-Vauzelles (French pronunciation: [obɔ̃kuʁ vozɛl]) is a commune in the Ardennes department in the Grand Est region of north-eastern France.

== Geography ==
Auboncourt-Vauzelles is located some 38 km south-west of Charleville-Mézières and 16 km north-east of Rethel. The A34 autoroute passes through the north-west of the commune but the nearest exit is Exit 14 some 6 km north of the commune. Access to the commune is by the D 951 road from Novy-Chevrières in the south-west which passes through the north-west of the commune and the hamlet of Vauzelles as it goes north to join the A34 autoroute at Exit 14. The D 14 road comes from Corny-Machéroménil in the north-west which passes through Vauzelles and the centre of the commune before continuing south to Faux. Access to the village is by small roads that run off the D 14 - the Chemin d'Auboncourt and the Chemin de la Fontaine. The commune is entirely farmland except for the fringe of the Bois d'Auboncourt forest in the north-east.

The Ruisseau de Saulces flows through the east of the commune and the village from north to south-east and continues to join the Aisne south of Amagne.

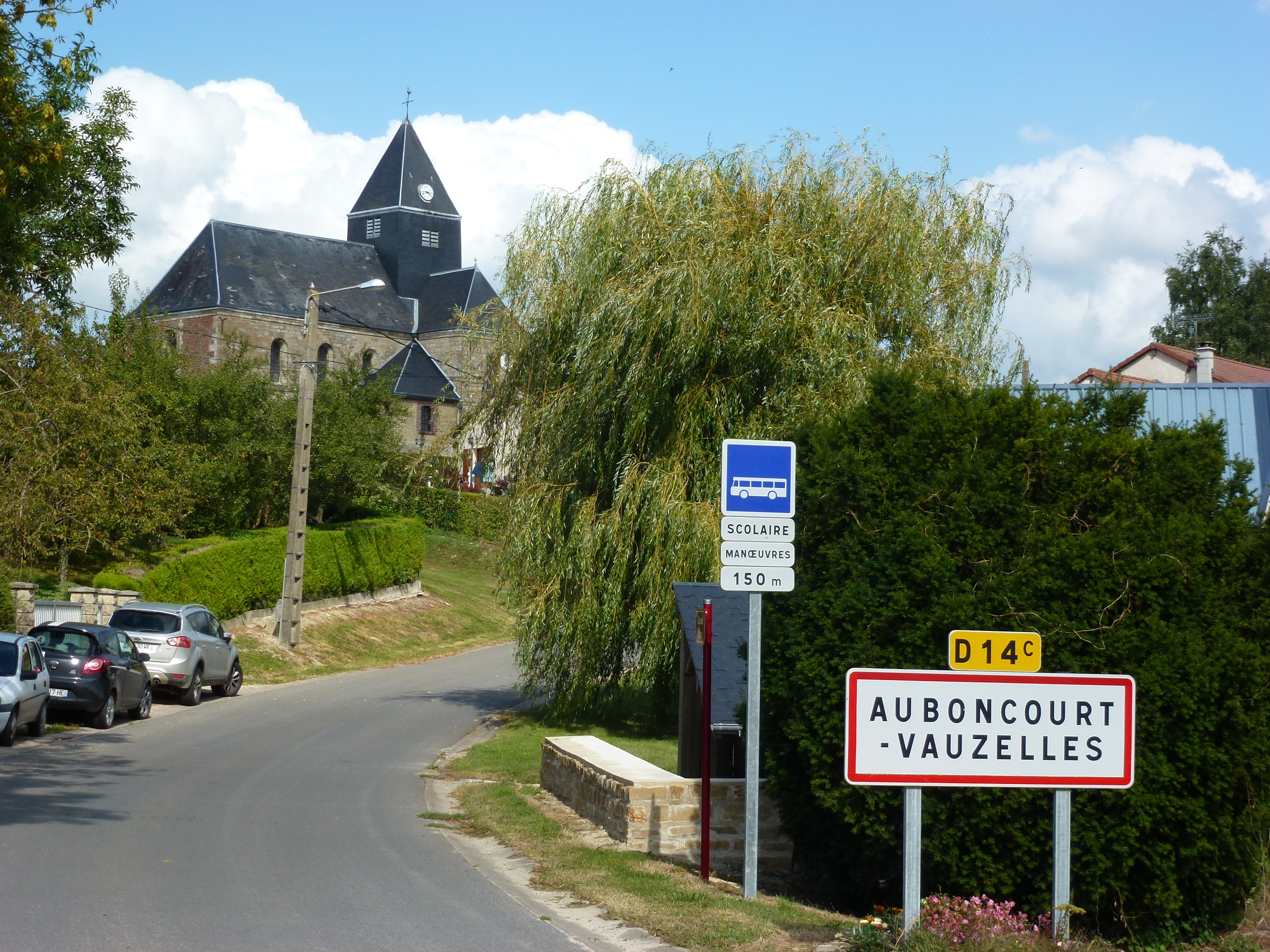
Entrance to the village

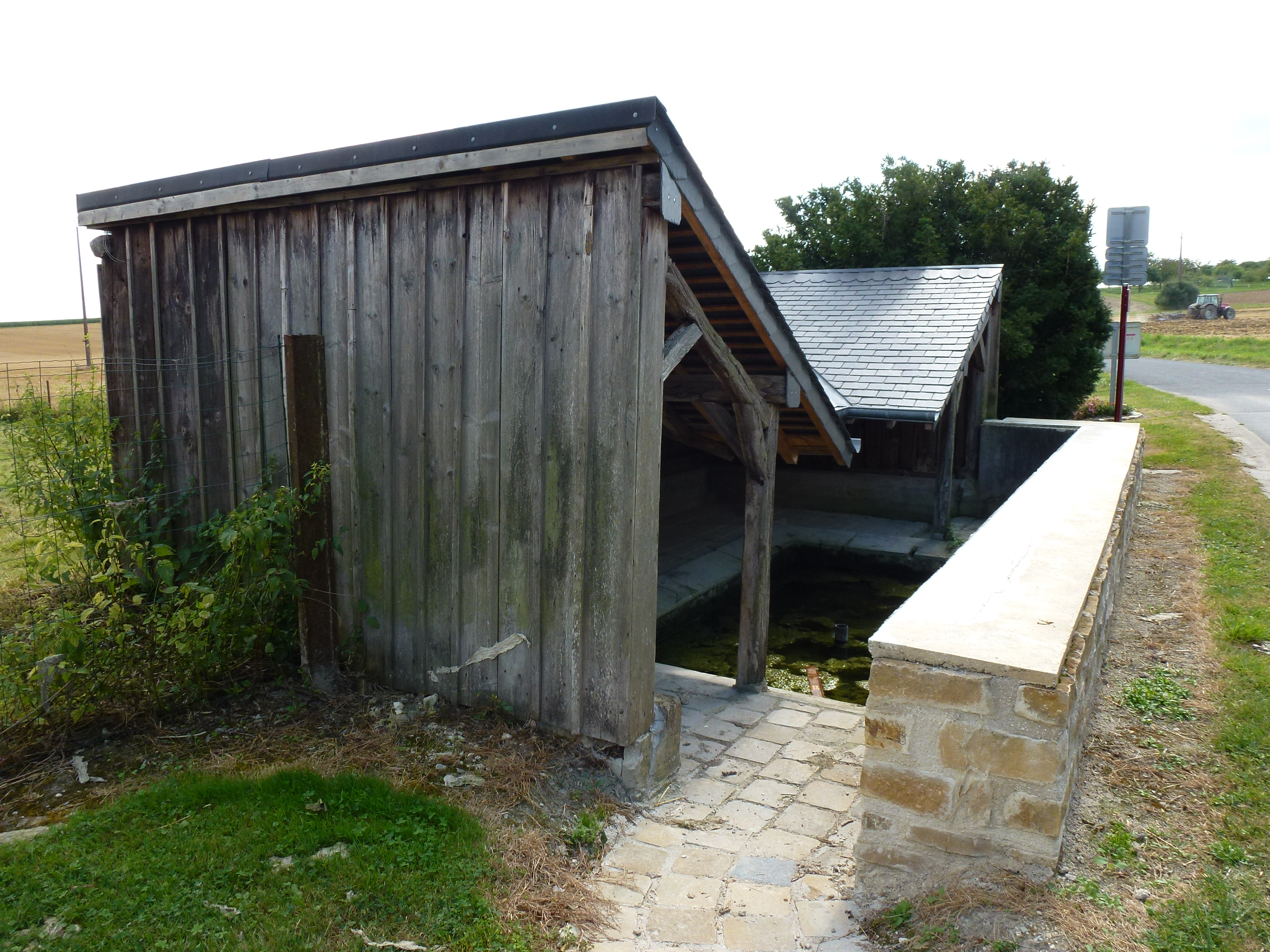
The lavoir (public laundry)

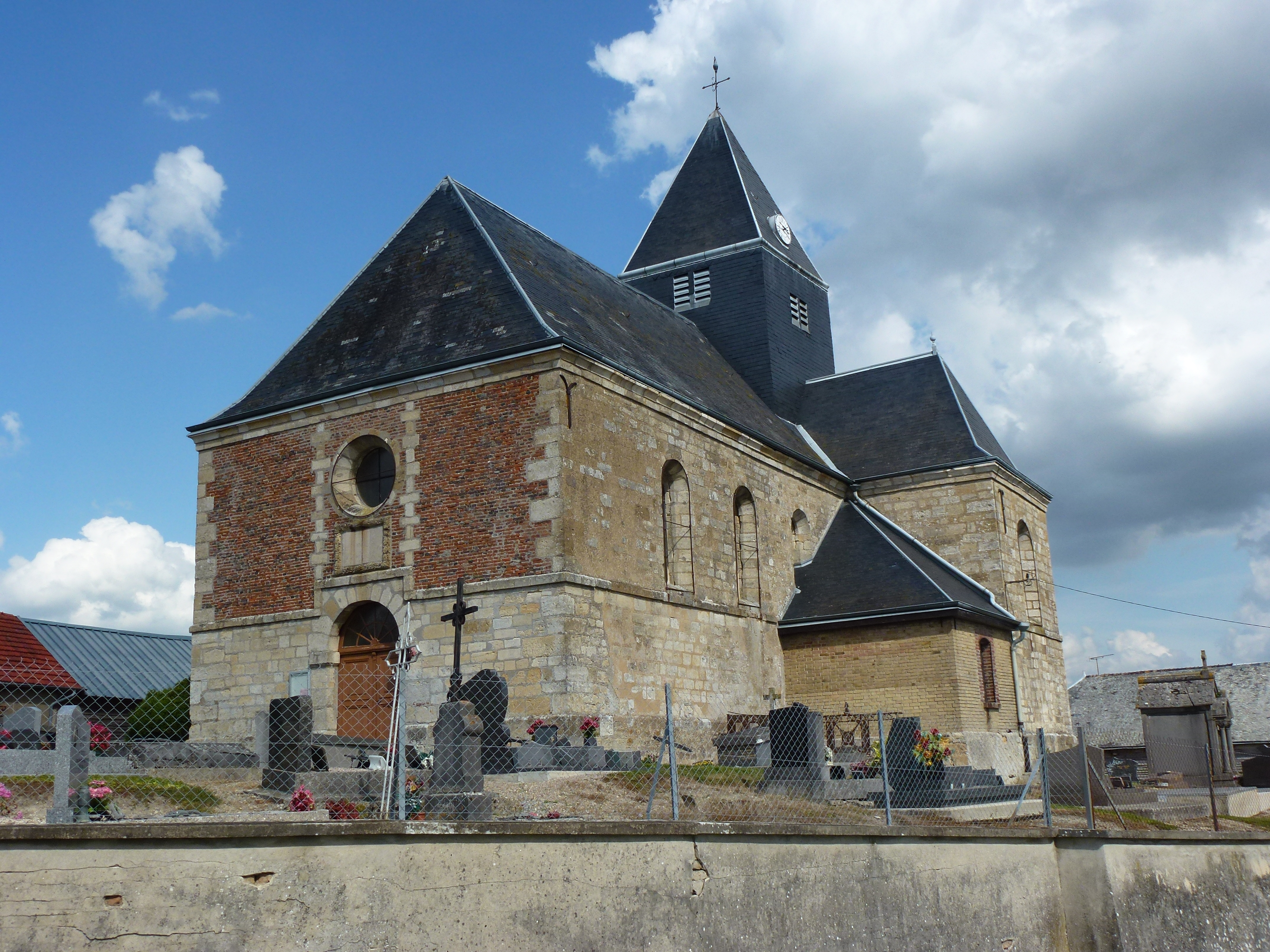
The church

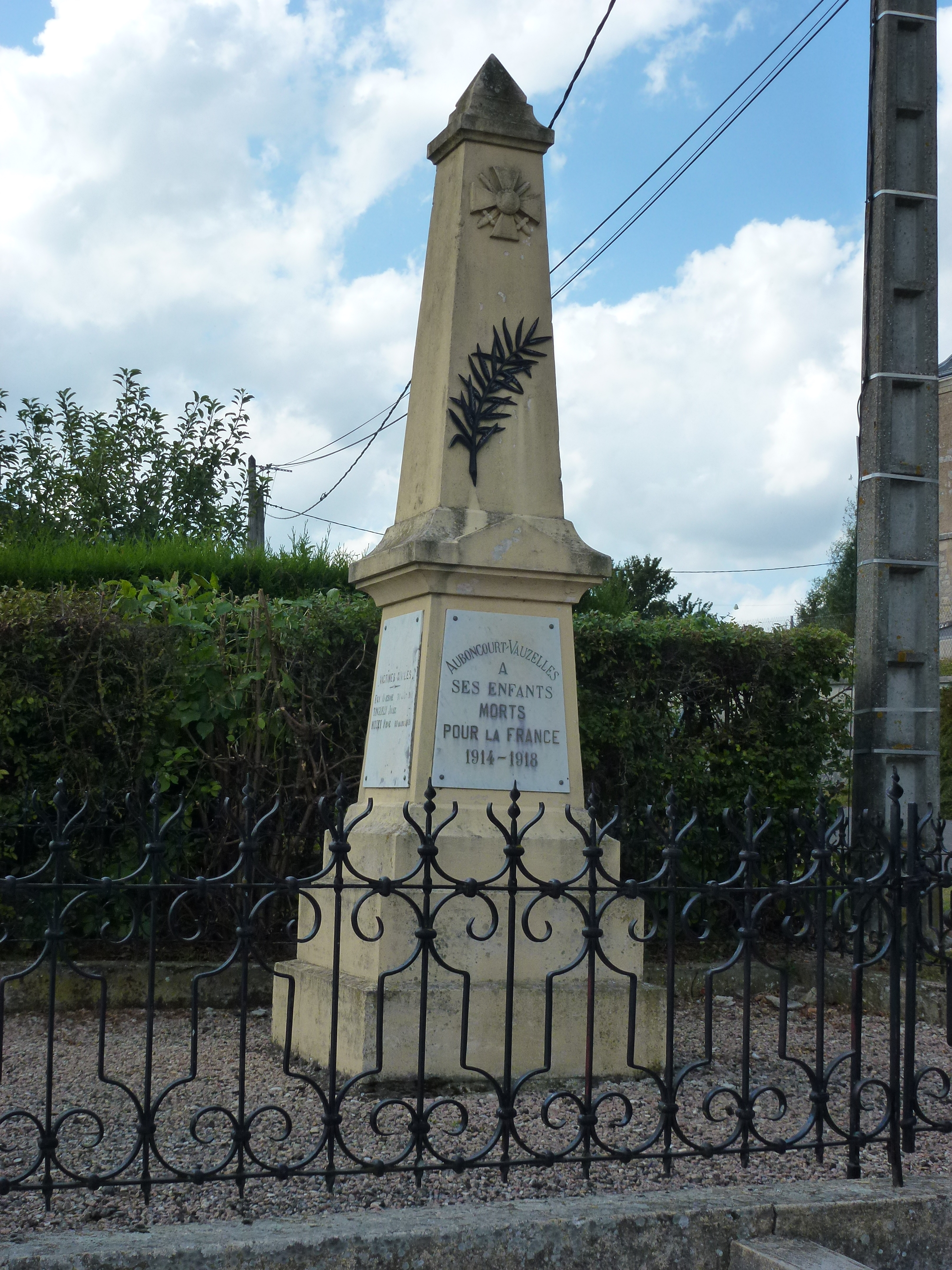
The war memorial

== Administration ==
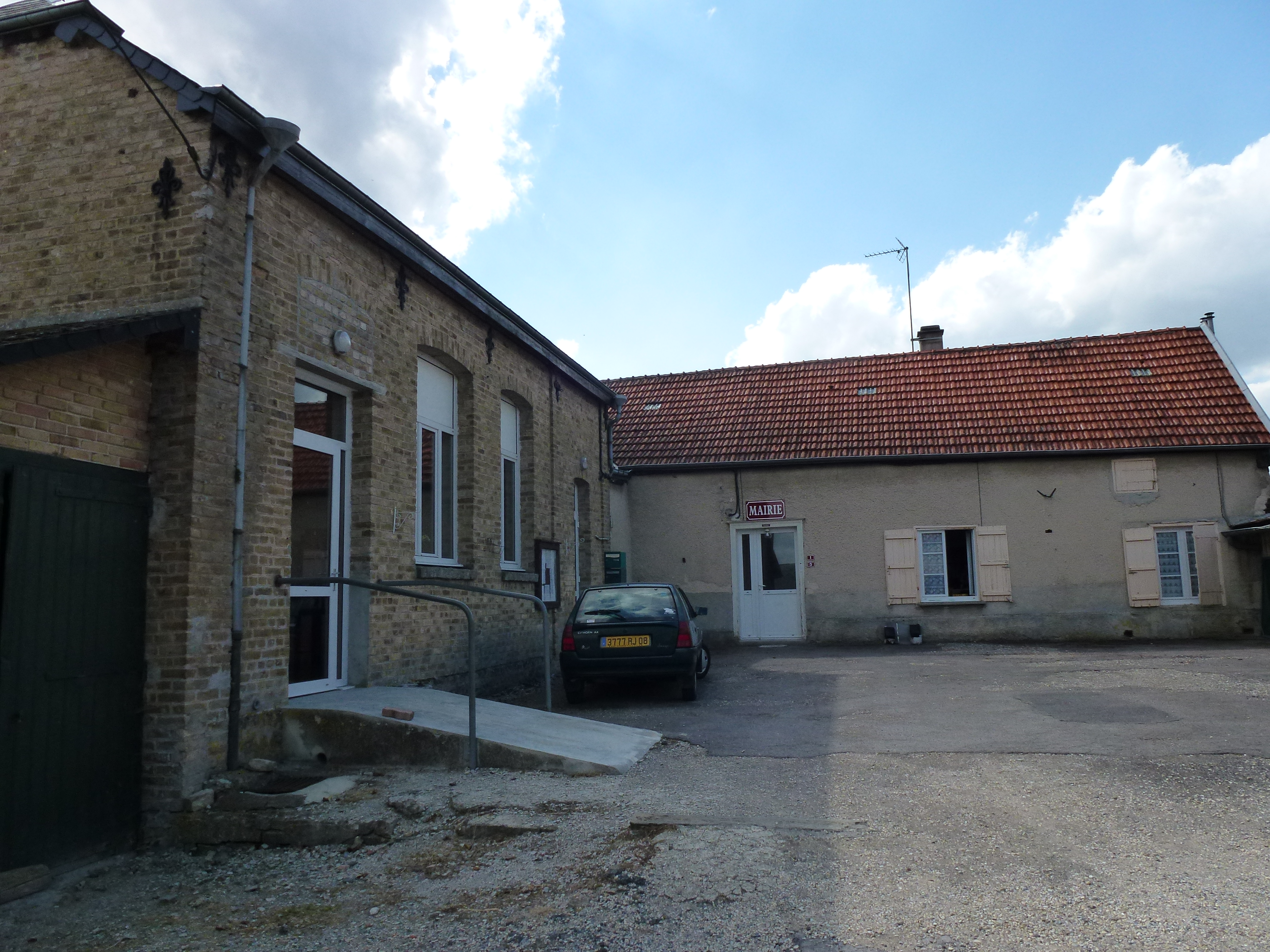
The Town Hall

List of Mayors
From	To	Name
1995	2008	Michel Hot
2008	2012	Armelle Malherbe
2012	current	Benoît Carier

== Demography ==
The population data given in the table and graph below for 1821 and earlier refer to the former commune of Auboncourt. The number for 1793 includes the commune of Monclin.

Historical population

Year	Pop.	±% p.a.
1793	364	—
1800	153	−11.65%
1821	164	+0.33%
1831	267	+4.99%
1846	281	+0.34%
1872	270	−0.15%
1901	229	−0.57%
1911	186	−2.06%
1921	129	−3.59%
1936	111	−1.00%
1946	114	+0.27%

Year	Pop.	±% p.a.
1962	97	−1.00%
1968	85	−2.18%
1975	80	−0.86%
1982	82	+0.35%
1990	82	+0.00%
1999	85	+0.40%
2007	105	+2.68%
2012	102	−0.58%
2017	100	−0.40%
2023	95	−0.85%

Source: EHESS and INSEE

== See also ==
- Communes of the Ardennes department
