= Chaumont-Porcien =

- Commune
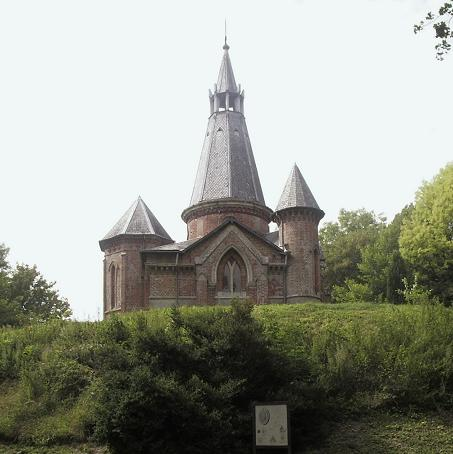
- Hermitage of St. Berthauld

- Coat of arms
- Location of Chaumont-Porcien
- Location within France Location within Grand Est
- Coordinates: 49°39′00″N 4°14′52″E
- Country: France
- Region: Grand Est
- Department: Ardennes
- Arrondissement: Rethel
- Canton: Signy-l'Abbaye
- Intercommunality: Crêtes Préardennaises

Government
  - Mayor (2024–2026): Philippe Laneau
- Area^{1}: 35.97 km^{2} (13.89 sq mi)
- Elevation: 137 m (449 ft)
- Highest elevation: 240 m (790 ft)
- Lowest elevation: 100 m (330 ft)
- Population (2023): 462
  - Density: 12.8/km^{2} (33.3/sq mi)
- Time zone: UTC+01:00 (CET)
  - Summer (DST): UTC+02:00 (CEST)
- INSEE/Postal code: 08113 /08220
- ^{1} French Land Register data, which excludes lakes, ponds, glaciers > 1 km^{2} (0.386 sq mi or 247 acres) and river estuaries.

Chaumont-Porcien (French pronunciation: [ʃomɔ̃ pɔʁsjɛ̃]) is a commune in the Ardennes department in northern France.

== Population ==
Historical population
Year	Pop.	±% p.a.
1968	625	—
1975	569	−1.33%
1982	478	−2.46%
1990	479	+0.03%
1999	473	−0.14%
2007	455	−0.48%
2012	464	+0.39%
2017	485	+0.89%
2023	462	−0.81%
Source: INSEE

== History ==
After his travel to the tomb of Jesus, in the 6th century, Berthauld, son of an Irish king, travelled to France. When he arrived at the forest of Chaumont-Porcien (which no longer exists), he saw the "Bald Mount", called like this because there were no trees on it, whereas the forest covered all the rest of the landscape. Berthauld became Saint-Berthauld, because he spread the God's word in a pagan area. After his dead, an abbey was built. Destroyed many times, there is nothing left. Thanks to Isidore Fressancourt, a chapel was built in 1876, on the "Bald Mount", still standing, and a way to discover histories and legends of "Porcien".

== See also ==
- Communes of the Ardennes department
