= Saulces-Monclin =

- Commune
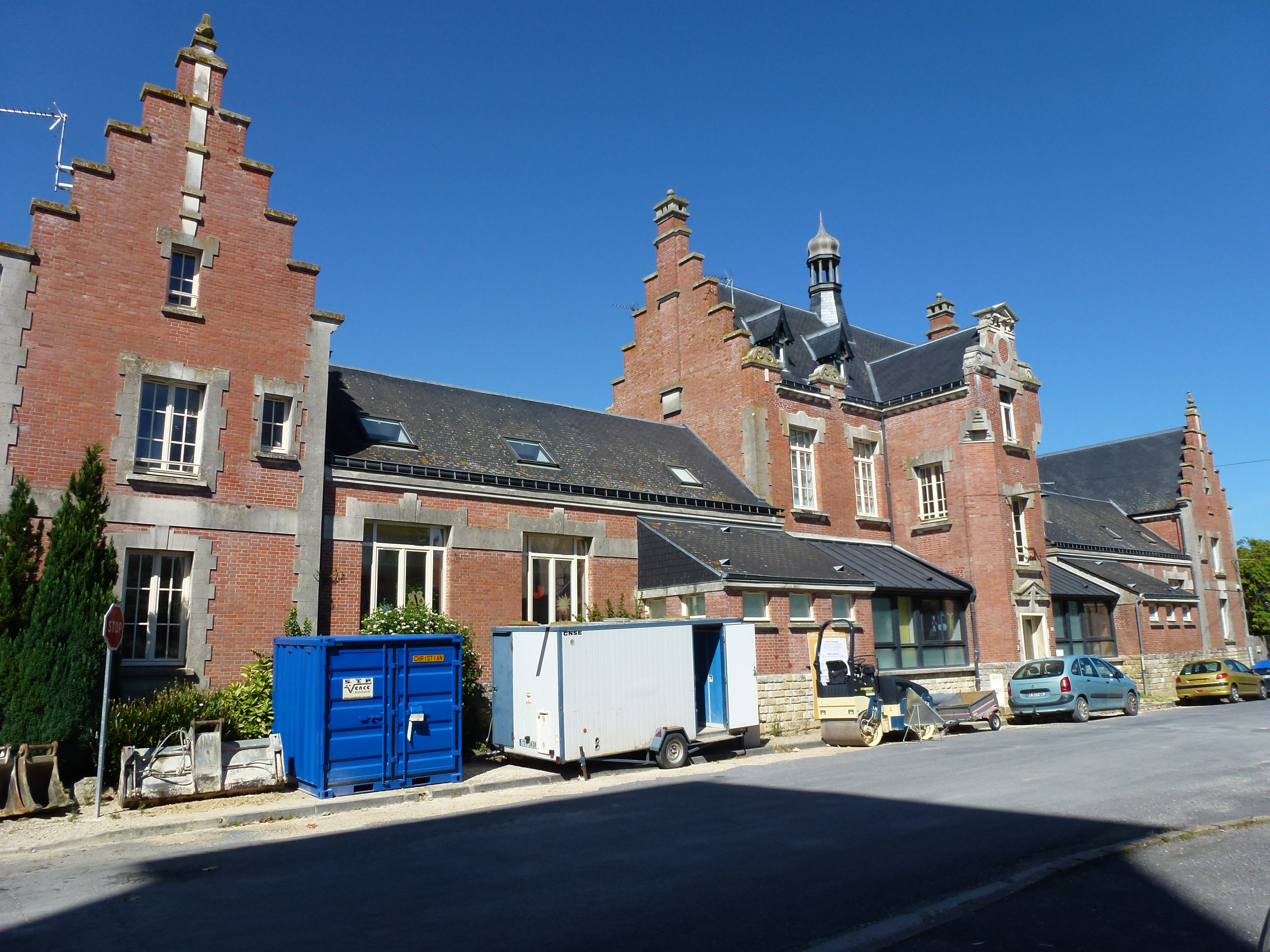
- School
- Location of Saulces-Monclin
- Location within France Location within Grand Est
- Coordinates: 49°34′37″N 4°29′53″E
- Country: France
- Region: Grand Est
- Department: Ardennes
- Arrondissement: Rethel
- Canton: Signy-l'Abbaye
- Intercommunality: Crêtes Préardennaises

Government
  - Mayor (2020–2026): Maurice Jeannelle
- Area^{1}: 20.23 km^{2} (7.81 sq mi)
- Elevation: 152 m (499 ft)
- Population (2023): 837
  - Density: 41.4/km^{2} (107/sq mi)
- Time zone: UTC+01:00 (CET)
  - Summer (DST): UTC+02:00 (CEST)
- INSEE/Postal code: 08402 /08270
- ^{1} French Land Register data, which excludes lakes, ponds, glaciers > 1 km^{2} (0.386 sq mi or 247 acres) and river estuaries.

Saulces-Monclin (French pronunciation: [so(l)s mɔ̃klɛ̃]) is a commune in the Ardennes department in northern France.

== Population ==
Historical population
Year	Pop.	±% p.a.
1968	526	—
1975	518	−0.22%
1982	474	−1.26%
1990	513	+0.99%
1999	528	+0.32%
2007	629	+2.21%
2012	721	+2.77%
2017	811	+2.38%
2023	837	+0.53%
Source: INSEE

== See also ==
- Communes of the Ardennes department
