= Faissault =

- Commune
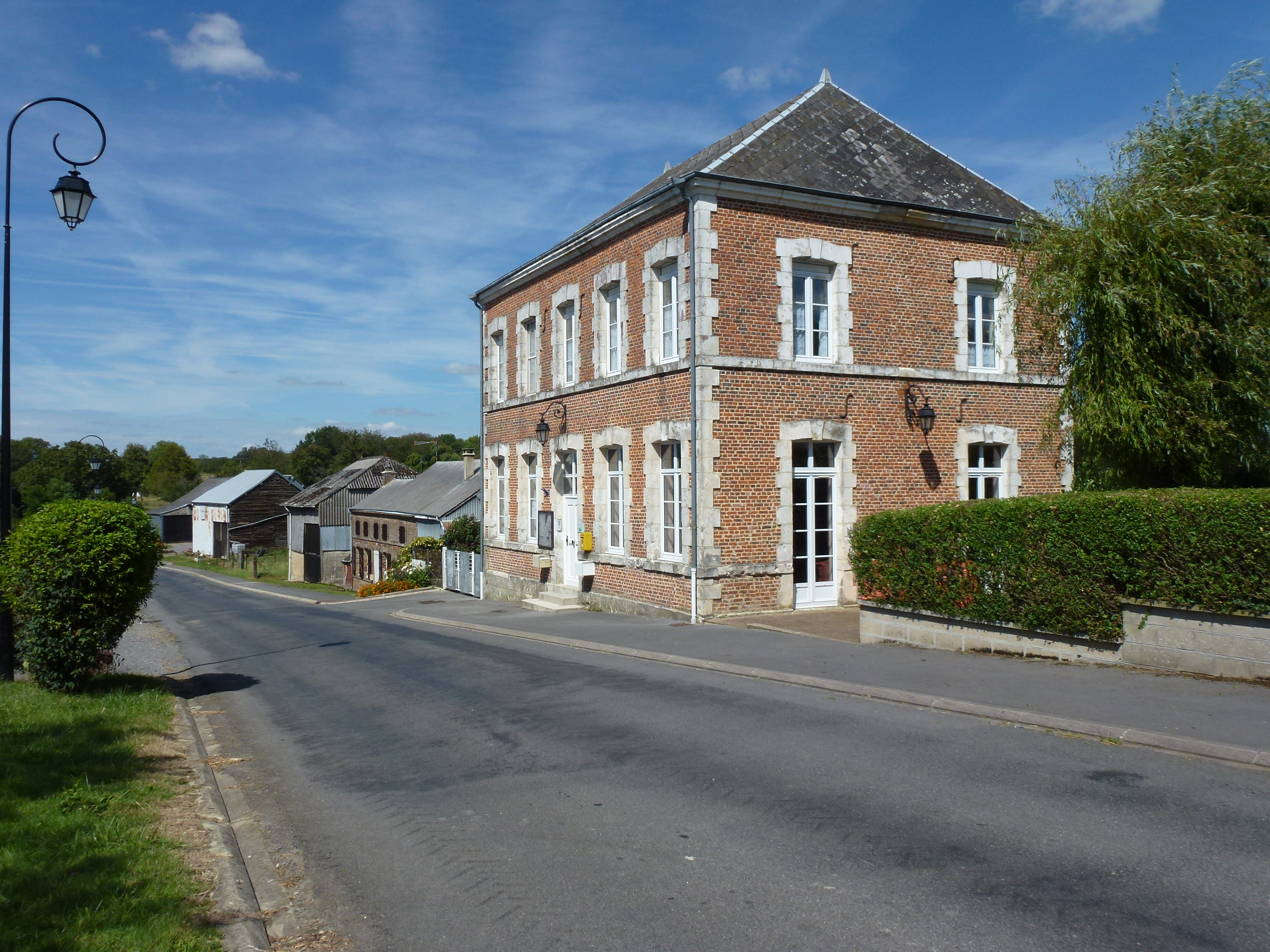
- Town hall

- Coat of arms
- Location of Faissault
- Location within France Location within Grand Est
- Coordinates: 49°36′29″N 4°30′37″E
- Country: France
- Region: Grand Est
- Department: Ardennes
- Arrondissement: Rethel
- Canton: Signy-l'Abbaye
- Intercommunality: Crêtes Préardennaises

Government
  - Mayor (2022–2026): Jean-François Bouchat
- Area^{1}: 6.07 km^{2} (2.34 sq mi)
- Elevation: 180 m (590 ft)
- Population (2023): 255
  - Density: 42.0/km^{2} (109/sq mi)
- Time zone: UTC+01:00 (CET)
  - Summer (DST): UTC+02:00 (CEST)
- INSEE/Postal code: 08163 /08270
- ^{1} French Land Register data, which excludes lakes, ponds, glaciers > 1 km^{2} (0.386 sq mi or 247 acres) and river estuaries.

Faissault (French pronunciation: [fɛso]) is a commune in the Ardennes department in northern France.

== Population ==
Historical population
Year	Pop.	±% p.a.
1968	172	—
1975	163	−0.76%
1982	178	+1.27%
1990	207	+1.90%
1999	189	−1.01%
2007	200	+0.71%
2012	228	+2.66%
2017	251	+1.94%
2023	255	+0.26%
Source: INSEE

== See also ==
- Communes of the Ardennes department
