= La Romagne, Ardennes =

La Romagne
- Commune
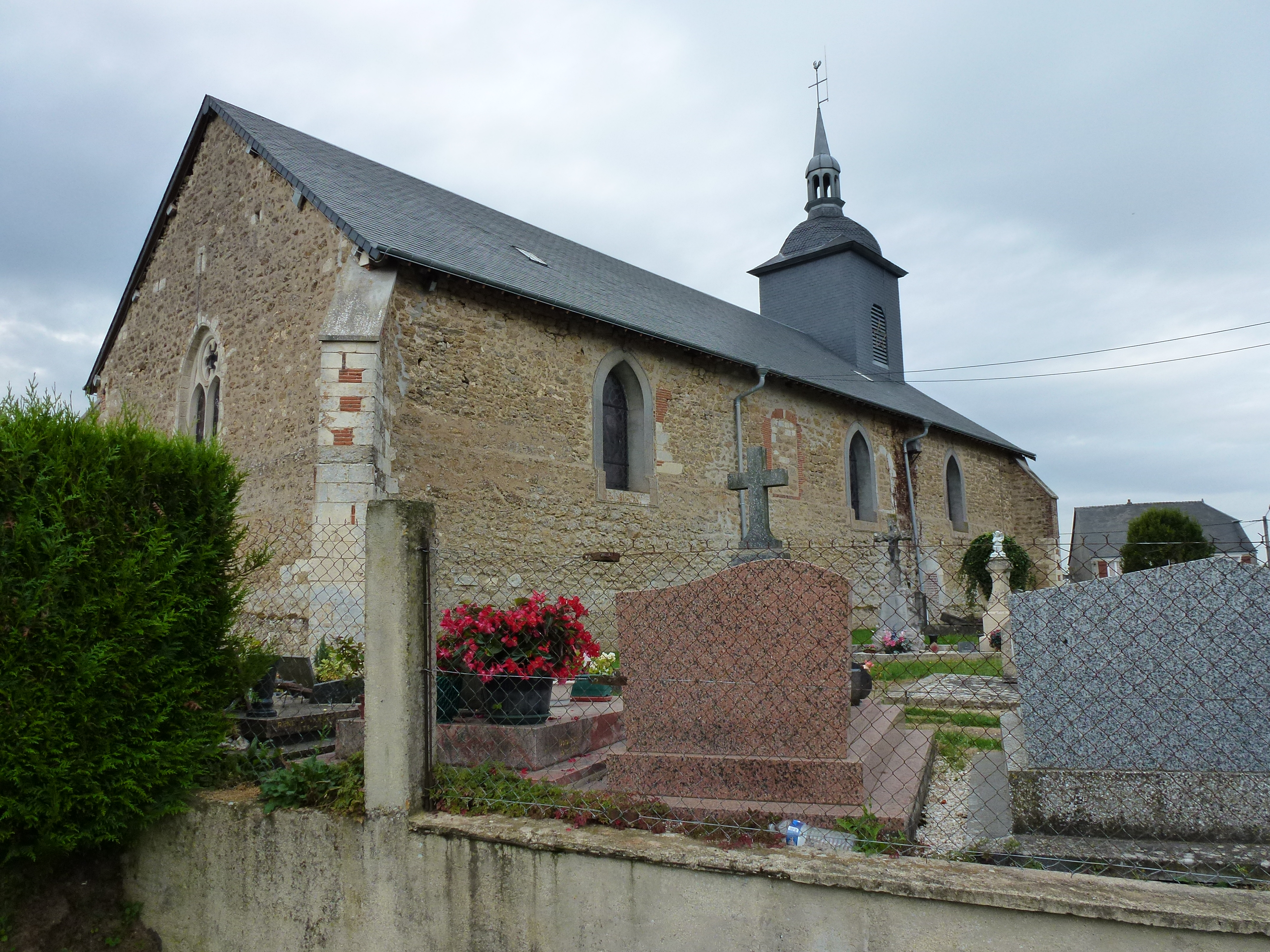
- The church in La Romagne

- Coat of arms
- Location of La Romagne
- Location within France Location within Grand Est
- Coordinates: 49°40′47″N 4°18′56″E
- Country: France
- Region: Grand Est
- Department: Ardennes
- Arrondissement: Rethel
- Canton: Signy-l'Abbaye
- Intercommunality: Crêtes Préardennaises

Government
  - Mayor (2020–2026): René Malherbe
- Area^{1}: 9.91 km^{2} (3.83 sq mi)
- Elevation: 186 m (610 ft)
- Population (2023): 130
  - Density: 13/km^{2} (34/sq mi)
- Time zone: UTC+01:00 (CET)
  - Summer (DST): UTC+02:00 (CEST)
- INSEE/Postal code: 08369 /08220
- ^{1} French Land Register data, which excludes lakes, ponds, glaciers > 1 km^{2} (0.386 sq mi or 247 acres) and river estuaries.

La Romagne (French pronunciation: [la ʁɔmaɲ]) is a commune in the Ardennes department and Grand Est region of north-eastern France.

== Population ==
Historical population
Year	Pop.	±% p.a.
1968	188	—
1975	168	−1.59%
1982	153	−1.33%
1990	139	−1.19%
1999	119	−1.71%
2007	122	+0.31%
2012	135	+2.05%
2017	130	−0.75%
2023	130	+0.00%
Source: INSEE

== See also ==
- Communes of the Ardennes department
