= Viel-Saint-Remy =

- Commune
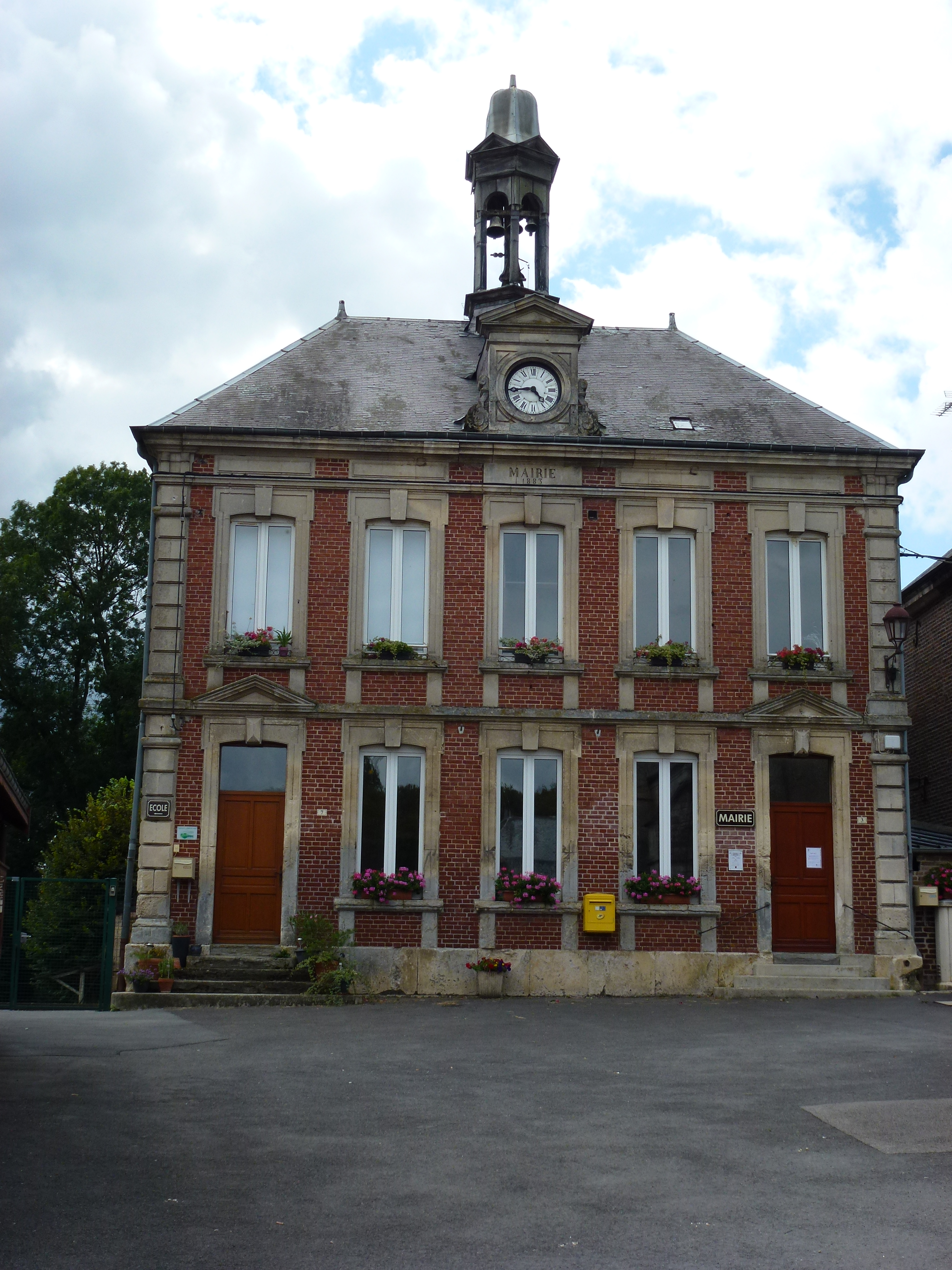
- Town hall

- Coat of arms
- Location of Viel-Saint-Remy
- Location within France Location within Grand Est
- Coordinates: 49°37′50″N 4°30′12″E
- Country: France
- Region: Grand Est
- Department: Ardennes
- Arrondissement: Rethel
- Canton: Signy-l'Abbaye
- Intercommunality: Crêtes Préardennaises

Government
  - Mayor (2020–2026): Philippe Daubange
- Area^{1}: 22.63 km^{2} (8.74 sq mi)
- Elevation: 175 m (574 ft)
- Population (2023): 302
  - Density: 13.3/km^{2} (34.6/sq mi)
- Time zone: UTC+01:00 (CET)
  - Summer (DST): UTC+02:00 (CEST)
- INSEE/Postal code: 08472 /08270
- ^{1} French Land Register data, which excludes lakes, ponds, glaciers > 1 km^{2} (0.386 sq mi or 247 acres) and river estuaries.

Viel-Saint-Remy is a commune in the Ardennes department in northern France.

== Population ==
Historical population
| Year | Pop. | ±% p.a. |
|---|---|---|
| 1968 | 351 | — |
| 1975 | 307 | −1.90% |
| 1982 | 292 | −0.71% |
| 1990 | 241 | −2.37% |
| 1999 | 243 | +0.09% |
| 2007 | 245 | +0.10% |
| 2012 | 274 | +2.26% |
| 2017 | 301 | +1.90% |
| 2023 | 302 | +0.06% |
Source: INSEE

== See also ==
- Communes of the Ardennes department
