= Le Thour =

- Commune
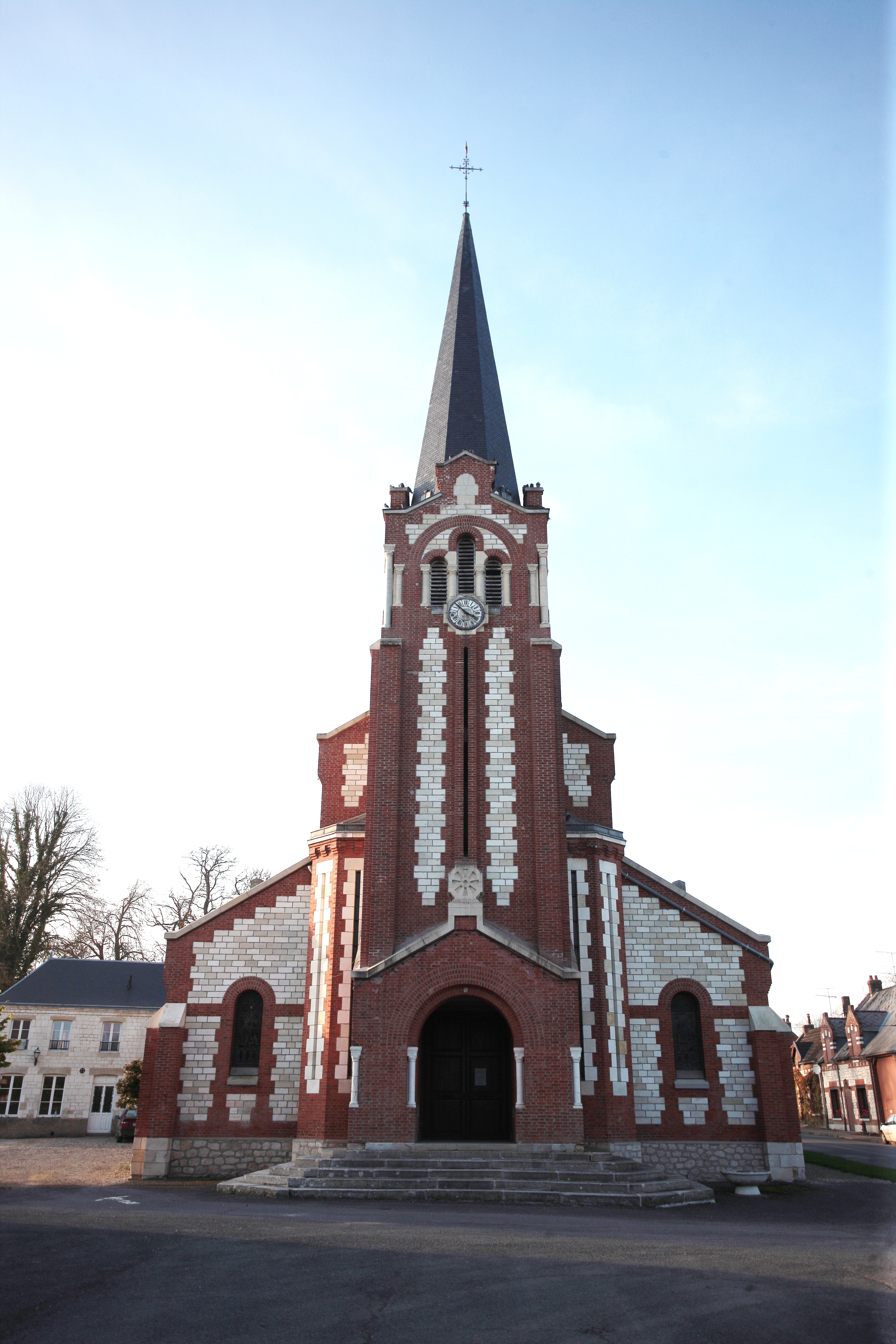
- The church in Le Thour
- Location of Le Thour
- Location within France Location within Grand Est
- Coordinates: 49°32′23″N 4°05′25″E
- Country: France
- Region: Grand Est
- Department: Ardennes
- Arrondissement: Rethel
- Canton: Château-Porcien

Government
  - Mayor (2020–2026): Ingrid Boucher
- Area^{1}: 16.62 km^{2} (6.42 sq mi)
- Elevation: 80 m (260 ft)
- Population (2023): 357
  - Density: 21.5/km^{2} (55.6/sq mi)
- Time zone: UTC+01:00 (CET)
  - Summer (DST): UTC+02:00 (CEST)
- INSEE/Postal code: 08451 /08190
- ^{1} French Land Register data, which excludes lakes, ponds, glaciers > 1 km^{2} (0.386 sq mi or 247 acres) and river estuaries.

Le Thour (French pronunciation: [lə tuʁ]) is a commune in the Ardennes department in northern France.

== Population ==
Historical population
Year	Pop.	±% p.a.
1968	377	—
1975	333	−1.76%
1982	303	−1.34%
1990	351	+1.86%
1999	317	−1.13%
2007	321	+0.16%
2012	362	+2.43%
2017	402	+2.12%
2023	357	−1.96%
Source: INSEE

== See also ==
- Communes of the Ardennes department
