= Grandchamp, Ardennes =

Grandchamp
- Commune
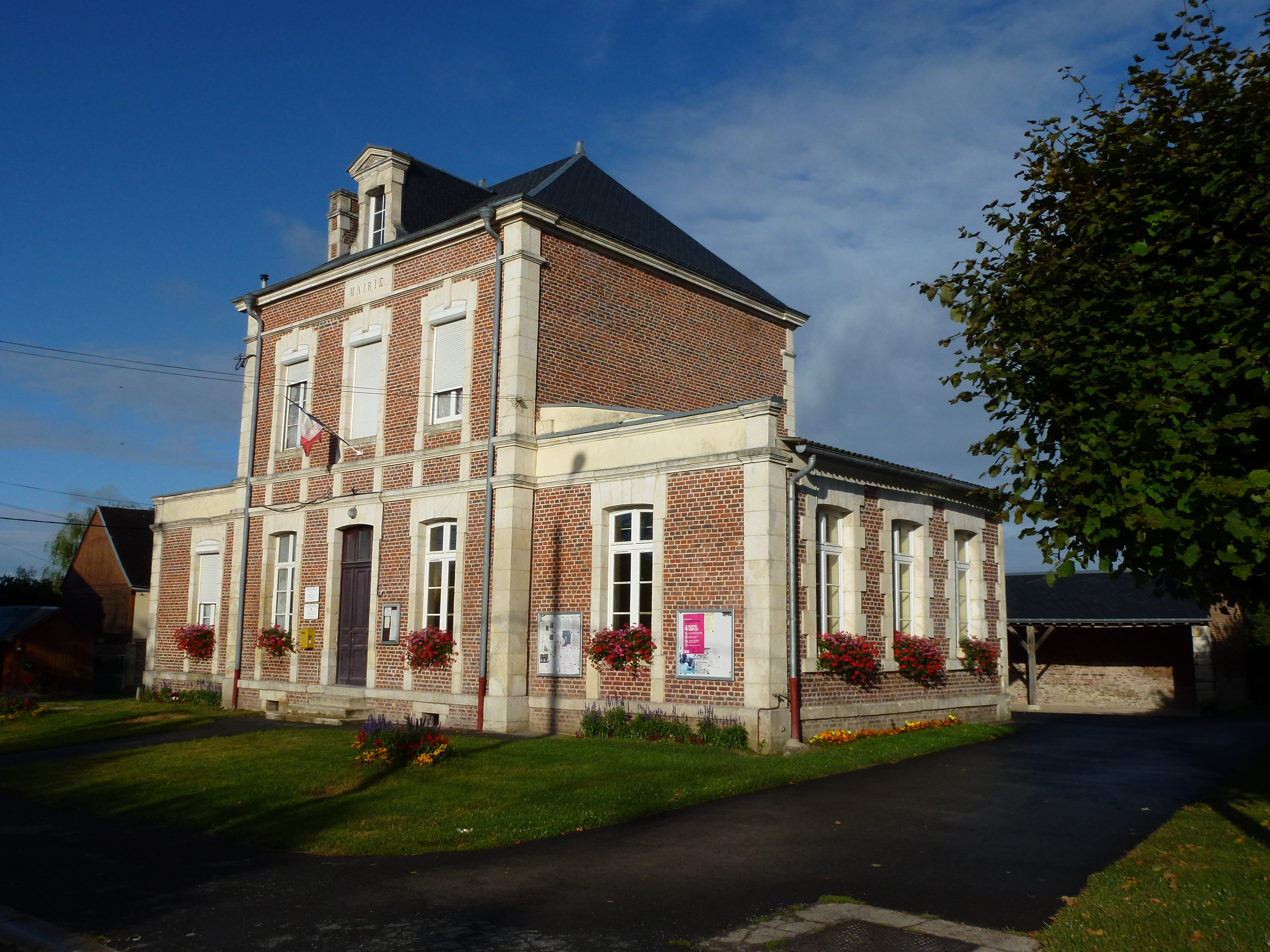
- The town hall in Grandchamp
- Location of Grandchamp
- Location within France Location within Grand Est
- Coordinates: 49°38′44″N 4°24′05″E
- Country: France
- Region: Grand Est
- Department: Ardennes
- Arrondissement: Rethel
- Canton: Signy-l'Abbaye
- Intercommunality: Crêtes Préardennaises

Government
  - Mayor (2020–2026): Bernard Portier
- Area^{1}: 7.28 km^{2} (2.81 sq mi)
- Elevation: 200 m (660 ft)
- Population (2023): 88
  - Density: 12/km^{2} (31/sq mi)
- Time zone: UTC+01:00 (CET)
  - Summer (DST): UTC+02:00 (CEST)
- INSEE/Postal code: 08196 /08270
- ^{1} French Land Register data, which excludes lakes, ponds, glaciers > 1 km^{2} (0.386 sq mi or 247 acres) and river estuaries.

Grandchamp French pronunciation: [ɡʁɑ̃ʃɑ̃] is a commune in the Ardennes department in northern France.

== Population ==
Historical population
Year	Pop.	±% p.a.
1968	110	—
1975	104	−0.80%
1982	104	+0.00%
1990	104	+0.00%
1999	86	−2.09%
2007	104	+2.40%
2012	87	−3.51%
2017	97	+2.20%
2023	88	−1.61%
Source: INSEE

== See also ==
- Communes of the Ardennes department
