= Sery, Ardennes =

Commune in France

Sery
- Commune
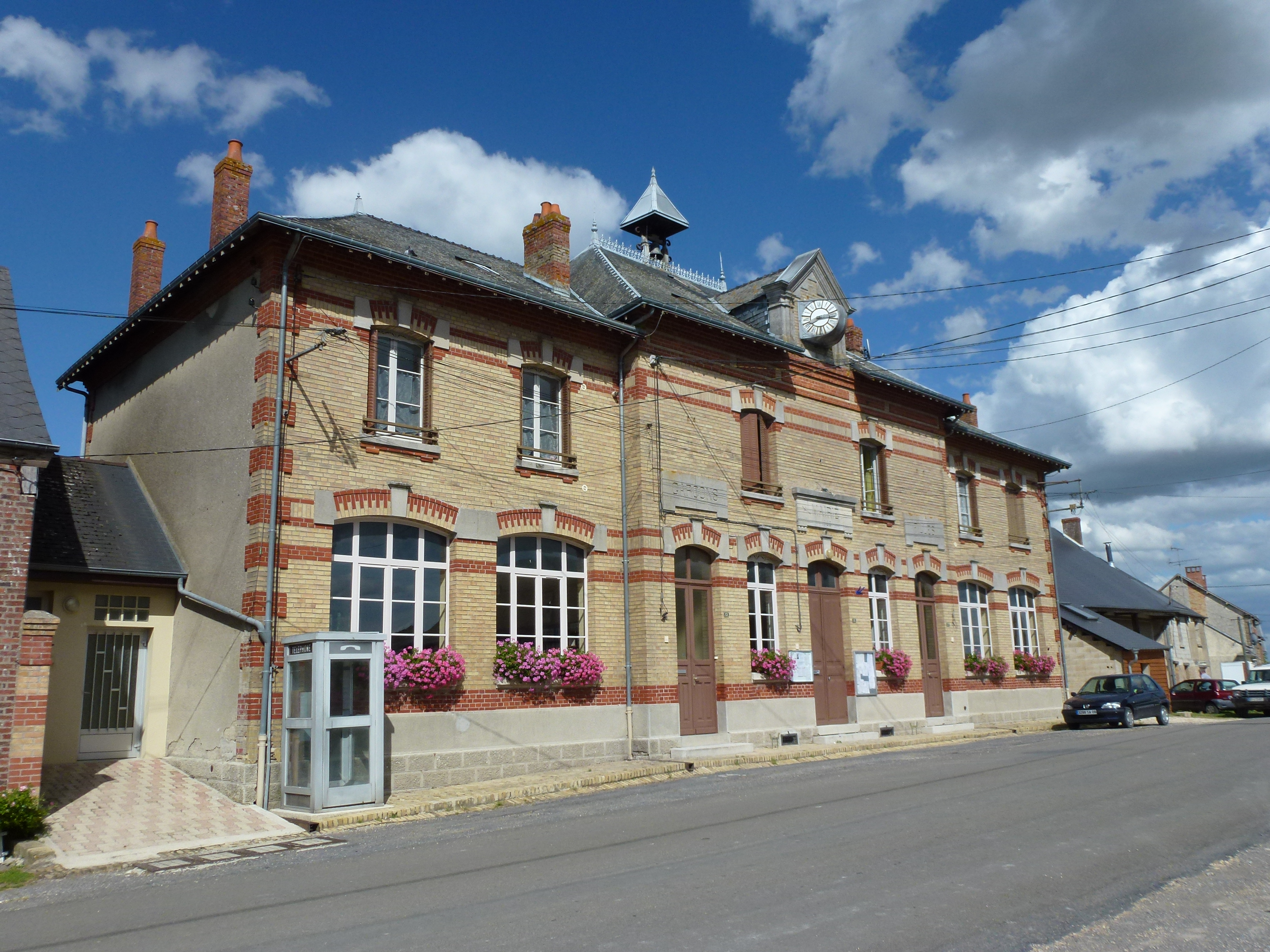
- The town hall in Sery
- Location of Sery
- Location within France Location within Grand Est
- Coordinates: 49°35′03″N 4°20′58″E
- Country: France
- Region: Grand Est
- Department: Ardennes
- Arrondissement: Rethel
- Canton: Signy-l'Abbaye
- Intercommunality: Crêtes Préardennaises

Government
  - Mayor (2023–2026): Daniel Thiebault
- Area^{1}: 18.57 km^{2} (7.17 sq mi)
- Elevation: 125 m (410 ft)
- Population (2023): 315
  - Density: 17.0/km^{2} (43.9/sq mi)
- Time zone: UTC+01:00 (CET)
  - Summer (DST): UTC+02:00 (CEST)
- INSEE/Postal code: 08415 /08270
- ^{1} French Land Register data, which excludes lakes, ponds, glaciers > 1 km^{2} (0.386 sq mi or 247 acres) and river estuaries.

Sery is a commune in the Ardennes department in northern France.

== Population ==
Historical population
Year	Pop.	±% p.a.
1968	402	—
1975	313	−3.51%
1982	314	+0.05%
1990	268	−1.96%
1999	287	+0.76%
2007	339	+2.10%
2012	342	+0.18%
2017	357	+0.86%
2023	315	−2.06%
Source: INSEE

== See also ==
- Communes of the Ardennes department
