= Neuvizy =

- Commune
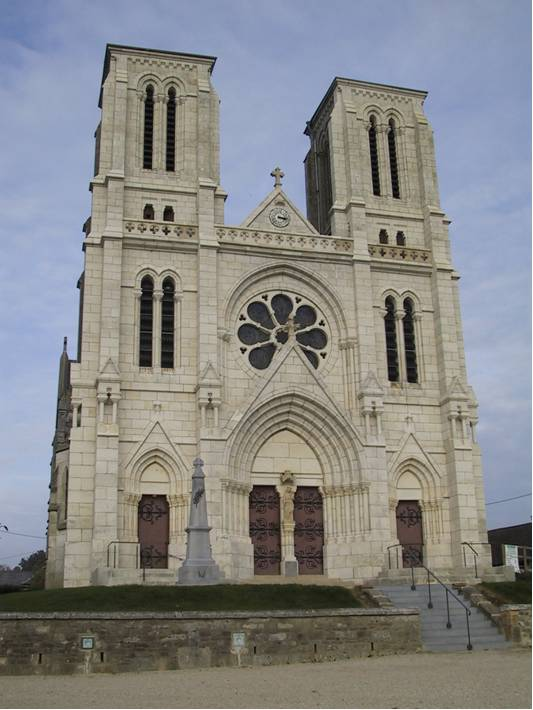
- Basilique Notre-Dame-de-Bon-Secours

- Coat of arms
- Location of Neuvizy
- Location within France Location within Grand Est
- Coordinates: 49°37′44″N 4°32′01″E
- Country: France
- Region: Grand Est
- Department: Ardennes
- Arrondissement: Rethel
- Canton: Signy-l'Abbaye
- Intercommunality: Crêtes Préardennaises

Government
  - Mayor (2023–2026): Stéphane Undreiner
- Area^{1}: 8.62 km^{2} (3.33 sq mi)
- Elevation: 209 m (686 ft)
- Population (2023): 124
  - Density: 14.4/km^{2} (37.3/sq mi)
- Time zone: UTC+01:00 (CET)
  - Summer (DST): UTC+02:00 (CEST)
- INSEE/Postal code: 08324 /08430
- ^{1} French Land Register data, which excludes lakes, ponds, glaciers > 1 km^{2} (0.386 sq mi or 247 acres) and river estuaries.

Neuvizy (French pronunciation: [nøvizi]) is a commune in the Ardennes department in northern France. The Basilique Notre-Dame-de-Bon-Secours in Neuvizy, a smaller copy of the Notre-Dame de Paris from 1865, is a pilgrimage church.

== Population ==
Historical population
Year	Pop.	±% p.a.
1968	134	—
1975	122	−1.33%
1982	100	−2.80%
1990	118	+2.09%
1999	116	−0.19%
2007	109	−0.78%
2012	118	+1.60%
2017	117	−0.17%
2023	124	+0.97%
Source: INSEE

== See also ==
- Communes of the Ardennes department
