= Novion-Porcien =

- Commune
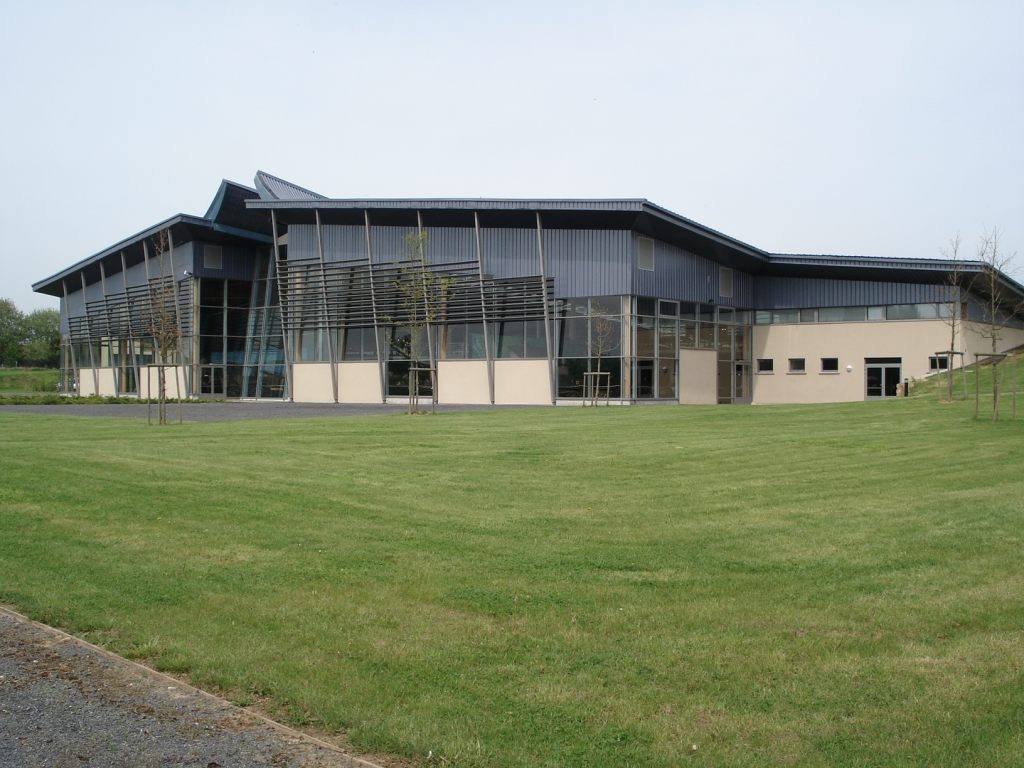
- War and Peace Museum

- Coat of arms
- Location of Novion-Porcien
- Location within France Location within Grand Est
- Coordinates: 49°36′03″N 4°25′28″E
- Country: France
- Region: Grand Est
- Department: Ardennes
- Arrondissement: Rethel
- Canton: Signy-l'Abbaye
- Intercommunality: Crêtes Préardennaises

Government
  - Mayor (2020–2026): Philippe Lantenois
- Area^{1}: 17.21 km^{2} (6.64 sq mi)
- Elevation: 90 m (300 ft)
- Population (2023): 526
  - Density: 30.6/km^{2} (79.2/sq mi)
- Time zone: UTC+01:00 (CET)
  - Summer (DST): UTC+02:00 (CEST)
- INSEE/Postal code: 08329 /08270
- ^{1} French Land Register data, which excludes lakes, ponds, glaciers > 1 km^{2} (0.386 sq mi or 247 acres) and river estuaries.

Novion-Porcien (French pronunciation: [nɔvjɔ̃ pɔʁsjɛ̃]) is a commune in the Ardennes department in northern France.

== Population ==
Historical population
Year	Pop.	±% p.a.
1968	573	—
1975	498	−1.98%
1982	467	−0.91%
1990	477	+0.27%
1999	481	+0.09%
2007	494	+0.33%
2012	509	+0.60%
2017	488	−0.84%
2023	526	+1.26%
Source: INSEE

== See also ==
- Communes of the Ardennes department
