= Neuflize =

- Commune
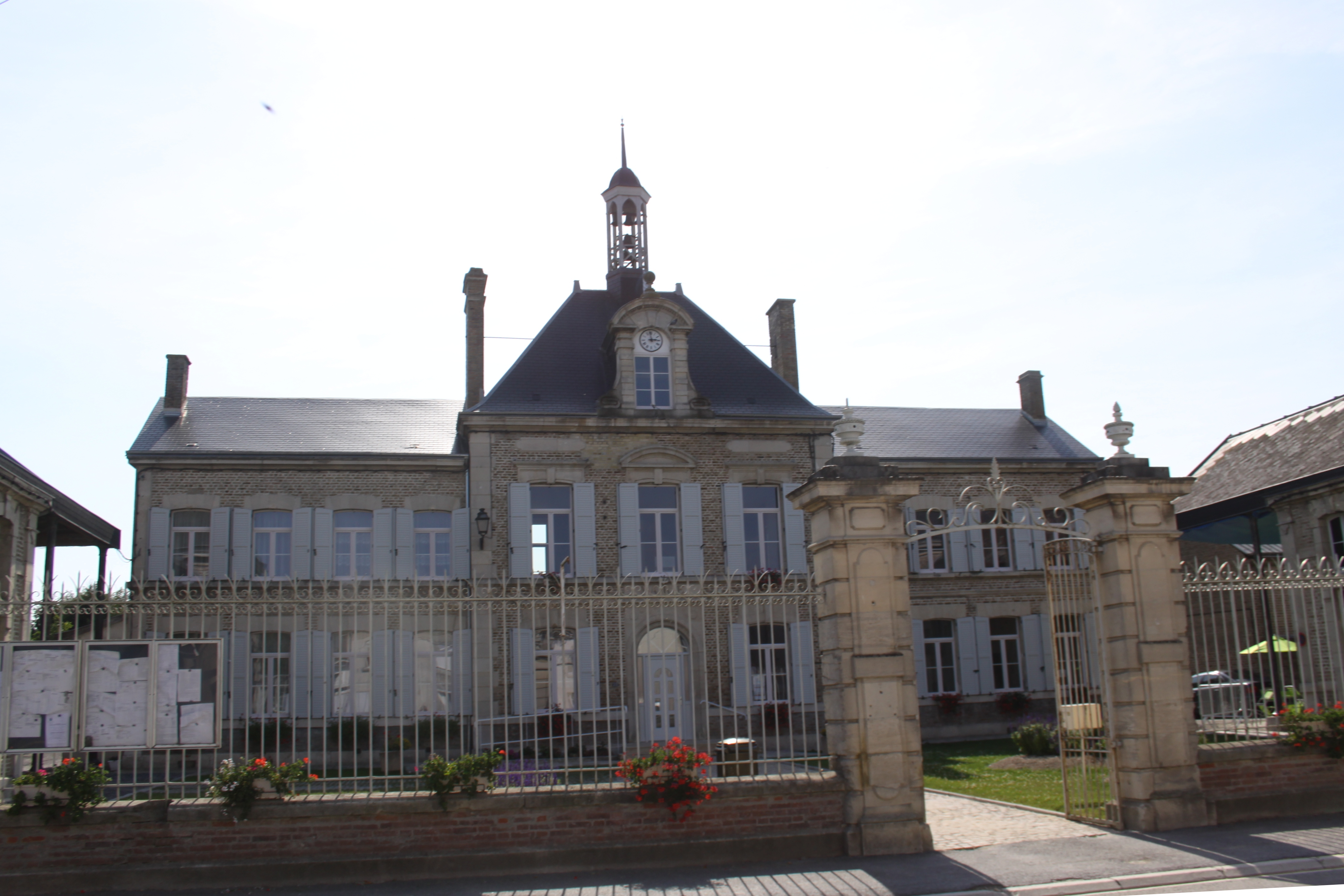
- Town hall

- Coat of arms
- Location of Neuflize
- Location within France Location within Grand Est
- Coordinates: 49°24′42″N 4°18′20″E
- Country: France
- Region: Grand Est
- Department: Ardennes
- Arrondissement: Rethel
- Canton: Château-Porcien

Government
  - Mayor (2020–2026): Romain Piatkowski
- Area^{1}: 13.78 km^{2} (5.32 sq mi)
- Elevation: 83 m (272 ft)
- Highest elevation: 146 m (479 ft)
- Lowest elevation: 78 m (256 ft)
- Population (2023): 855
  - Density: 62.0/km^{2} (161/sq mi)
- Time zone: UTC+01:00 (CET)
  - Summer (DST): UTC+02:00 (CEST)
- INSEE/Postal code: 08314 /08300
- ^{1} French Land Register data, which excludes lakes, ponds, glaciers > 1 km^{2} (0.386 sq mi or 247 acres) and river estuaries.

Neuflize (French pronunciation: [nœfliz]) is a commune in the Ardennes department in northern France.

== Population ==
Historical population
Year	Pop.	±% p.a.
1968	541	—
1975	532	−0.24%
1982	592	+1.54%
1990	598	+0.13%
1999	609	+0.20%
2007	711	+1.95%
2012	747	+0.99%
2017	783	+0.95%
2023	855	+1.48%
Source: INSEE

== See also ==
- Communes of the Ardennes department
