= Rocquigny, Ardennes =

Rocquigny
- Commune
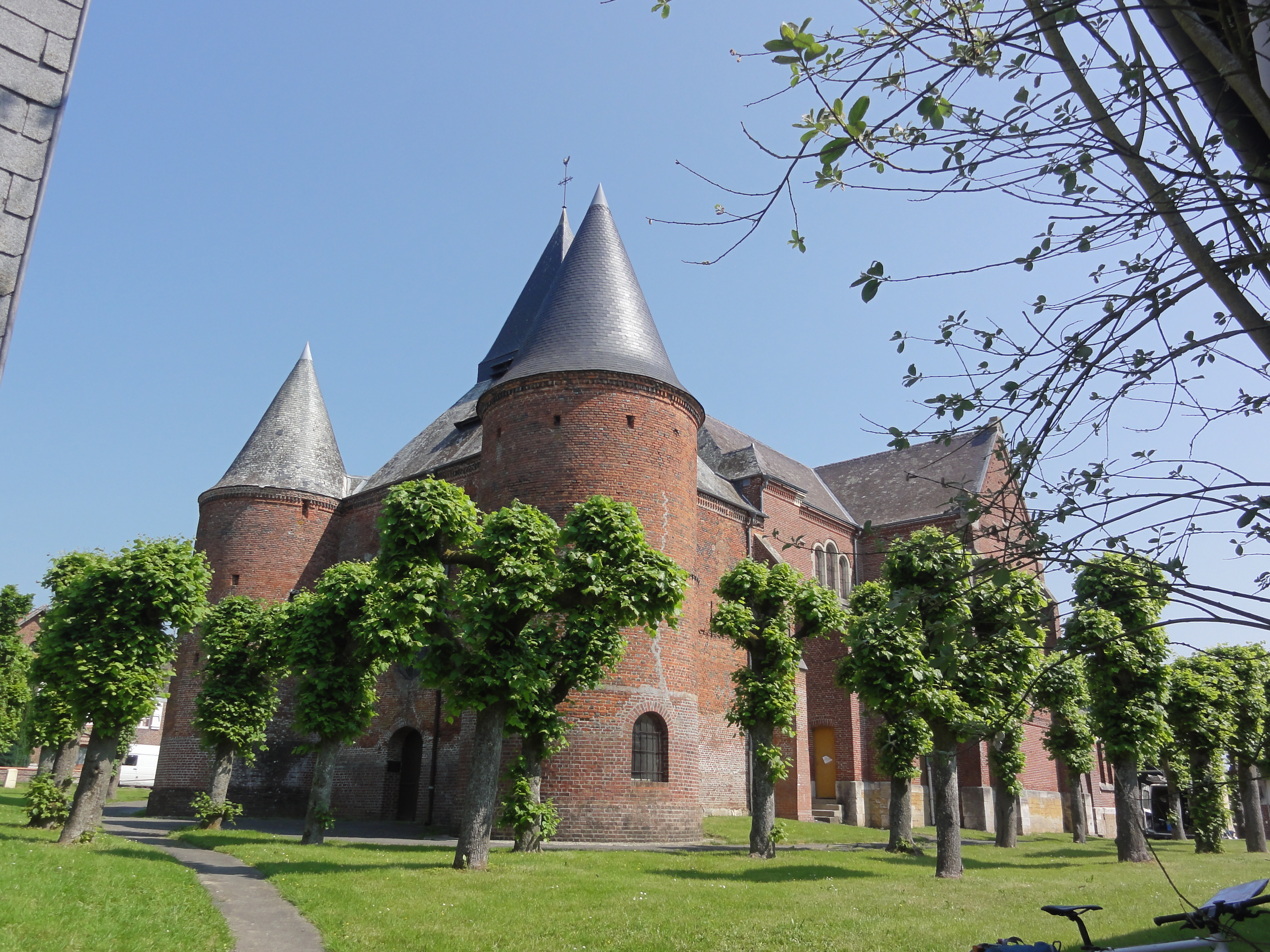
- Fortified church

- Coat of arms
- Location of Rocquigny
- Location within France Location within Grand Est
- Coordinates: 49°41′28″N 4°14′54″E
- Country: France
- Region: Grand Est
- Department: Ardennes
- Arrondissement: Rethel
- Canton: Signy-l'Abbaye
- Intercommunality: Crêtes Préardennaises

Government
  - Mayor (2020–2026): Serge Labie
- Area^{1}: 36.85 km^{2} (14.23 sq mi)
- Elevation: 130 m (430 ft)
- Population (2023): 647
  - Density: 17.6/km^{2} (45.5/sq mi)
- Time zone: UTC+01:00 (CET)
  - Summer (DST): UTC+02:00 (CEST)
- INSEE/Postal code: 08366 /08220
- ^{1} French Land Register data, which excludes lakes, ponds, glaciers > 1 km^{2} (0.386 sq mi or 247 acres) and river estuaries.

Rocquigny (French pronunciation: [ʁɔkiɲi]) is a commune in the Ardennes department in northern France.

== Population ==
Historical population
Year	Pop.	±% p.a.
1968	1,037	—
1975	896	−2.07%
1982	854	−0.68%
1990	775	−1.21%
1999	755	−0.29%
2007	760	+0.08%
2012	697	−1.72%
2017	686	−0.32%
2023	647	−0.97%
Source: INSEE

== See also ==
- Communes of the Ardennes department
