= Chesnois-Auboncourt =

- Commune
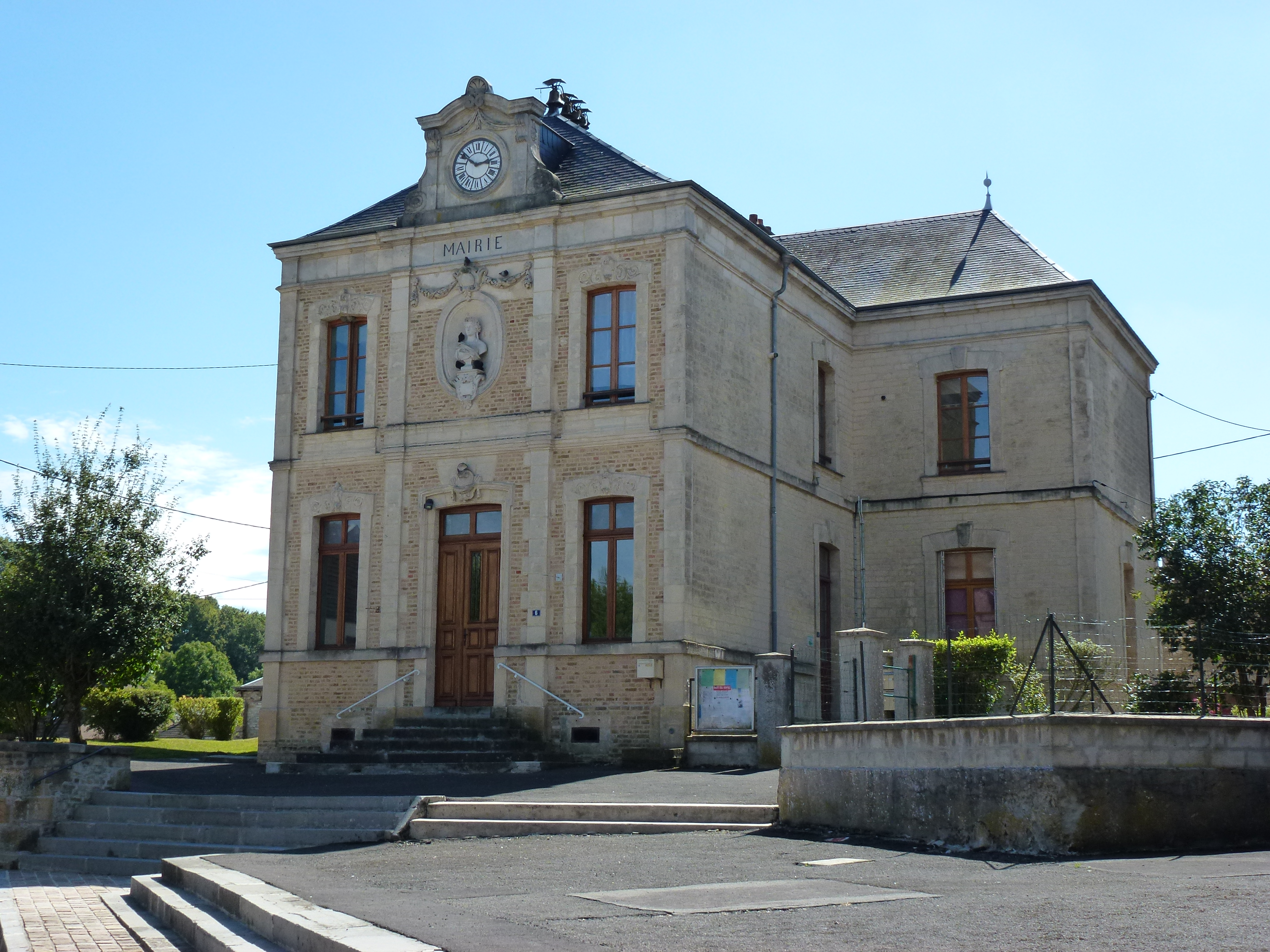
- Town hall
- Location of Chesnois-Auboncourt
- Location within France Location within Grand Est
- Coordinates: 49°34′N 4°34′E
- Country: France
- Region: Grand Est
- Department: Ardennes
- Arrondissement: Rethel
- Canton: Signy-l'Abbaye
- Intercommunality: Crêtes Préardennaises

Government
  - Mayor (2020–2026): Odile Villet
- Area^{1}: 5 km^{2} (1.9 sq mi)
- Highest elevation: 128 m (420 ft)
- Lowest elevation: 120 m (390 ft)
- Population (2023): 159
  - Density: 32/km^{2} (82/sq mi)
- Time zone: UTC+01:00 (CET)
  - Summer (DST): UTC+02:00 (CEST)
- INSEE/Postal code: 08117 /08270
- ^{1} French Land Register data, which excludes lakes, ponds, glaciers > 1 km^{2} (0.386 sq mi or 247 acres) and river estuaries.

Chesnois-Auboncourt (French pronunciation: [ʃɛnwa obɔ̃kuʁ]) is a commune in the Ardennes department and Grand Est region of north-eastern France.

== Population ==
Historical population
Year	Pop.	±% p.a.
1968	163	—
1975	138	−2.35%
1982	135	−0.31%
1990	153	+1.58%
1999	166	+0.91%
2007	158	−0.62%
2012	177	+2.30%
2017	169	−0.92%
2023	159	−1.01%
Source: INSEE

== See also ==
- Communes of the Ardennes department
