= Faux, Ardennes =

Faux
- Commune
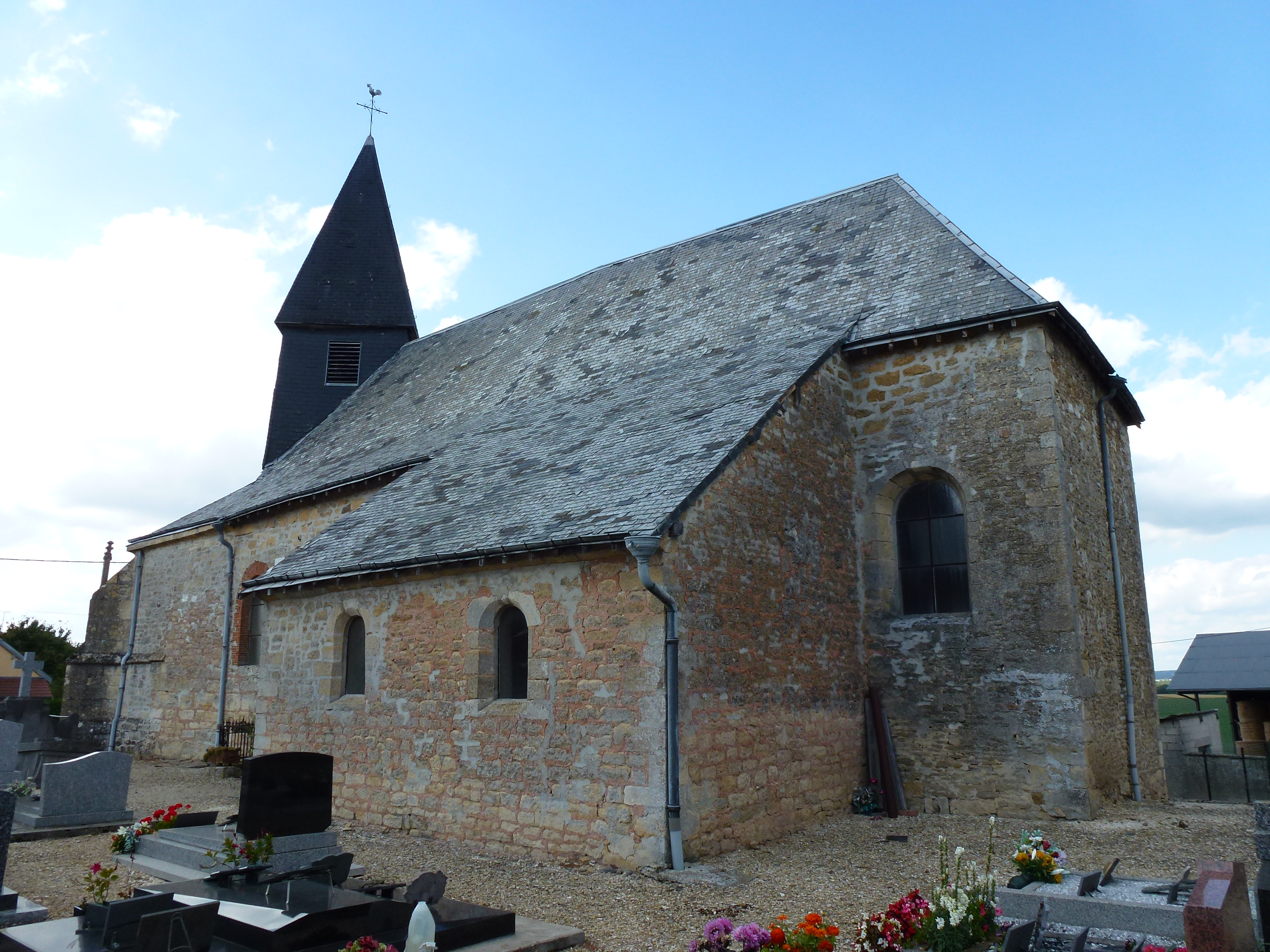
- The church in Faux
- Location of Faux
- Location within France Location within Grand Est
- Coordinates: 49°32′17″N 4°30′00″E
- Country: France
- Region: Grand Est
- Department: Ardennes
- Arrondissement: Rethel
- Canton: Signy-l'Abbaye
- Intercommunality: Crêtes Préardennaises

Government
  - Mayor (2020–2026): Luc Monceau
- Area^{1}: 3.28 km^{2} (1.27 sq mi)
- Elevation: 105 m (344 ft)
- Population (2023): 64
  - Density: 20/km^{2} (51/sq mi)
- Time zone: UTC+01:00 (CET)
  - Summer (DST): UTC+02:00 (CEST)
- INSEE/Postal code: 08165 /08270
- ^{1} French Land Register data, which excludes lakes, ponds, glaciers > 1 km^{2} (0.386 sq mi or 247 acres) and river estuaries.

Faux (French pronunciation: [fo]) is a commune in the Ardennes department in northern France.

== Population ==
Historical population
Year	Pop.	±% p.a.
1968	68	—
1975	53	−3.50%
1982	57	+1.04%
1990	60	+0.64%
1999	51	−1.79%
2007	55	+0.95%
2012	56	+0.36%
2017	57	+0.35%
2023	64	+1.95%
Source: INSEE

== See also ==
- Communes of the Ardennes department
