= Mesmont, Ardennes =

Mesmont
- Commune
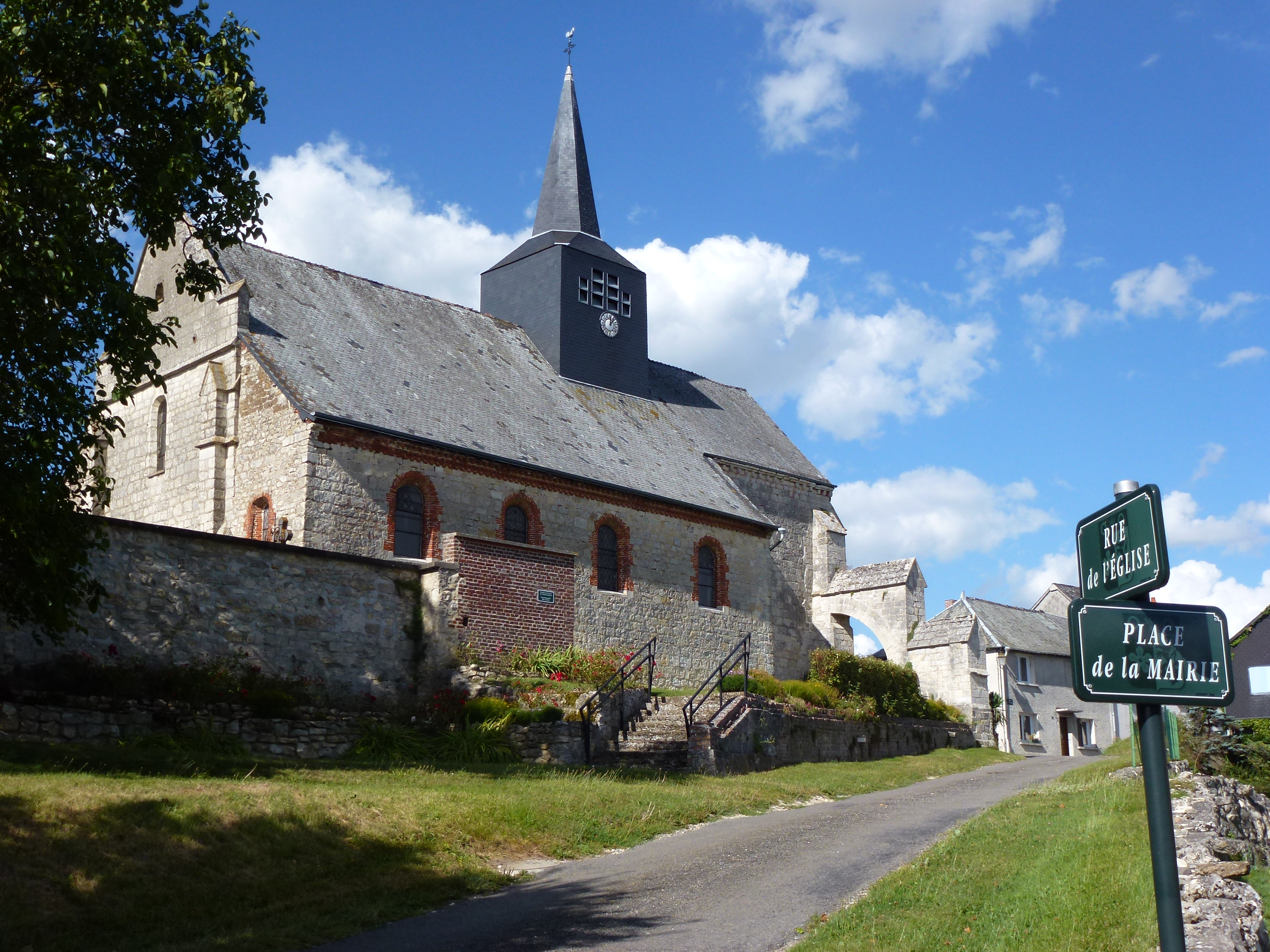
- The church in Mesmont

- Coat of arms
- Location of Mesmont
- Location within France Location within Grand Est
- Coordinates: 49°36′56″N 4°24′04″E
- Country: France
- Region: Grand Est
- Department: Ardennes
- Arrondissement: Rethel
- Canton: Signy-l'Abbaye
- Intercommunality: Crêtes Préardennaises

Government
  - Mayor (2020–2026): Sébastien Dervaux
- Area^{1}: 11.32 km^{2} (4.37 sq mi)
- Elevation: 98 m (322 ft)
- Population (2023): 91
  - Density: 8.0/km^{2} (21/sq mi)
- Time zone: UTC+01:00 (CET)
  - Summer (DST): UTC+02:00 (CEST)
- INSEE/Postal code: 08288 /08270
- ^{1} French Land Register data, which excludes lakes, ponds, glaciers > 1 km^{2} (0.386 sq mi or 247 acres) and river estuaries.

Mesmont (French pronunciation: [mɛmɔ̃]) is a commune in the Ardennes department in northern France.

== Population ==
Historical population
Year	Pop.	±% p.a.
1968	117	—
1975	91	−3.53%
1982	88	−0.48%
1990	89	+0.14%
1999	101	+1.42%
2007	89	−1.57%
2012	107	+3.75%
2017	95	−2.35%
2023	91	−0.71%
Source: INSEE

== See also ==
- Communes of the Ardennes department
