= Canton of Asfeld =

Former canton in Ardennes

Coordinates: 49°24′46″N 4°07′12″E

- Former canton
- Location of the canton in the arrondissement of Rethel
- Country: France
- Region: Grand Est
- Department: Ardennes
- No. of communes: {{{nbcomm}}}
- Disbanded: 2015
- Area: 195.18 km^{2} (75.36 sq mi)
- Population (2012): 5,913
  - Density: 30.30/km^{2} (78.46/sq mi)

The canton of Asfeld (French: Canton d'Asfeld) is a former French canton located in the Ardennes department in the former Champagne-Ardenne region (now part of Grand Est). This canton was organized around Asfeld in the arrondissement of Rethel.

== Departmental councilors ==
List of successive departemental councilors
Period		Name	Party	Ref.
1833	1853	Jean Nicolas Prillieux-Souef		
1853	1871	Jean-Louis Vincent Saint-Denis		
1871	1876	Simon Maximilien Genteur	Bonapartist	
1876	1886	Amédée Descubes Saint-Dézir		
1886	1910	Charles Merieux	PR	
1910	1919	Francois Gobreau-Dupuis	PR	
1919	1934	Marcel Braibant	RI	
1934	1938	Alfred Massonnet	FR	
1939	1940	André Charlier	PSF	
1945	1951	André Charlier	DVD	
1951	1976	André Landes	MRP then CD	
1976	2001	Claude Brévot	DVD	
2001	2015	Mireille Gatinois	DVD then UMP	

== Composition ==
The canton of Asfeld grouped together eighteen municipalities and had 5,913 inhabitants (2012 census without double counts).

- Aire
- Asfeld
- Avaux
- Balham
- Bergnicourt
- Blanzy-la-Salonnaise
- Brienne-sur-Aisne
- L'Écaille
- Gomont
- Houdilcourt
- Poilcourt-Sydney
- Roizy
- Saint-Germainmont
- Saint-Remy-le-Petit
- Sault-Saint-Remy
- Le Thour
- Vieux-lès-Asfeld
- Villers-devant-le-Thour
