= Avançon, Ardennes =

Avançon
- Commune
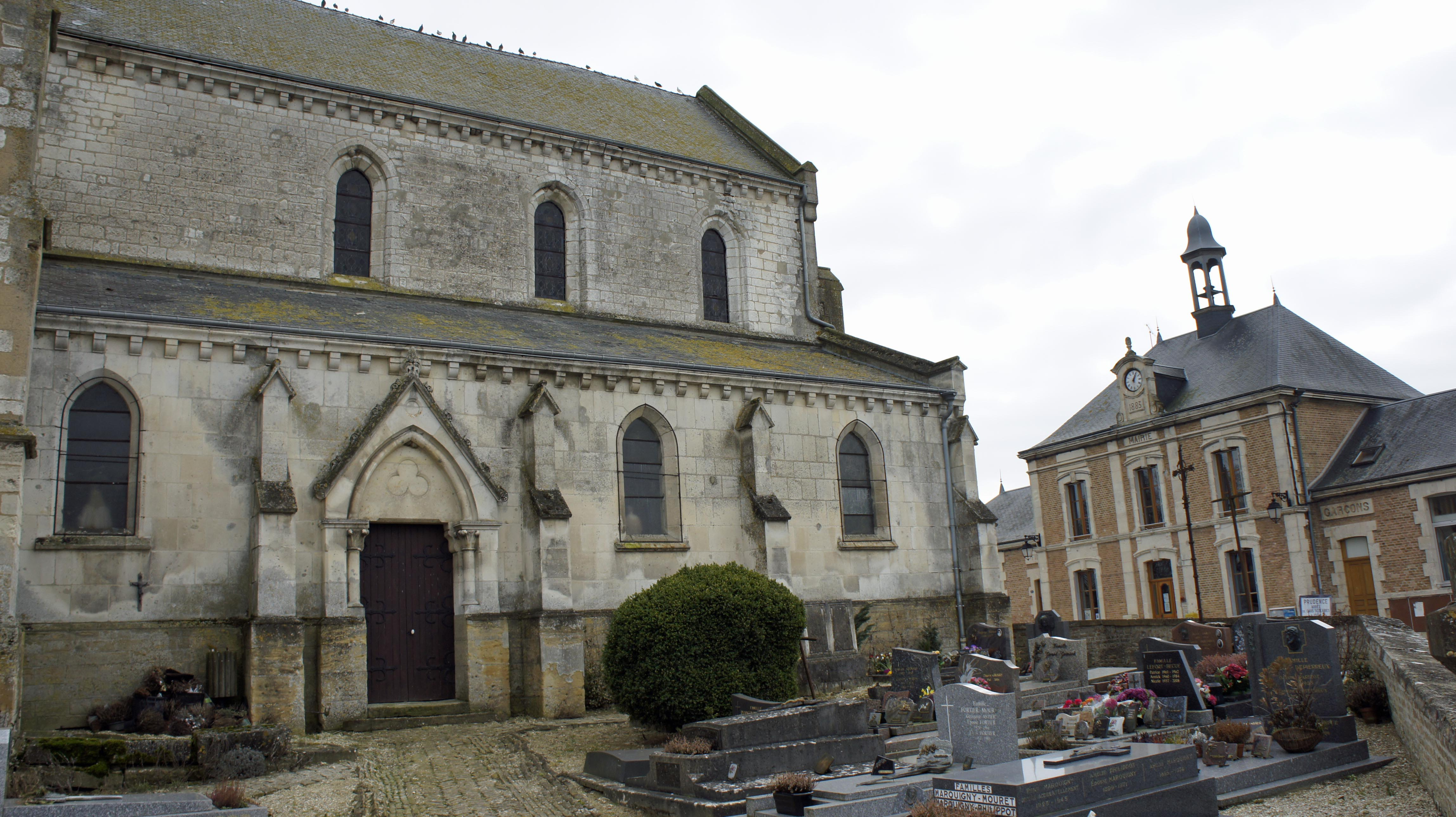
- View of the Church, cemetery, and town hall

- Coat of arms
- Location of Avançon
- Location within France Location within Grand Est
- Coordinates: 49°28′34″N 4°14′45″E
- Country: France
- Region: Grand Est
- Department: Ardennes
- Arrondissement: Rethel
- Canton: Château-Porcien
- Intercommunality: Pays Rethélois

Government
  - Mayor (2023–2026): Yvan Lefevre
- Area^{1}: 20.99 km^{2} (8.10 sq mi)
- Elevation: 95 m (312 ft)
- Population (2023): 341
  - Density: 16.2/km^{2} (42.1/sq mi)
- Time zone: UTC+01:00 (CET)
  - Summer (DST): UTC+02:00 (CEST)
- INSEE/Postal code: 08038 /08300
- ^{1} French Land Register data, which excludes lakes, ponds, glaciers > 1 km^{2} (0.386 sq mi or 247 acres) and river estuaries.

Avançon (French pronunciation: [avɑ̃sɔ̃]) is a commune in the Ardennes département in the Grand Est region of northern France.

== Geography ==
Avançon is located some 10 km south-west of Rethel and 11 km east of Asfeld. Access to the commune is by the D18 road from Acy-Romance in the north-east which passes through the commune to the village near the centre then continues west to Blanzy-la-Salonnaise. The D26 road goes from the village north to Taizy. The D150 goes south-west from the village to Saint-Loup-en-Champagne. The commune is entirely farmland.

=== Heraldry ===
Arms of Avançon, Ardennes	Blazon: Azure, a fleur-de-lis Argent between three mullets Or.

== Administration ==
List of Successive Mayors

From	To	Name
1793	1807	Rémy Tagnon
1807	1830	Guillaume Alexandre Monceau
1830	1839	Jean Trichet
1839	1843	Barthélémy Michelet
1843	1876	Jean Nicolas Rémy Legrand
1876	1892	Alexandre Paul Victor Koehler
1892	1912	Hubert Emmanuel Legros
1912	1919	Charles Eugène Michelet
1919	1921	Barthélémy Michelet
1921	1929	Edmond Désiré Lefevre
1929	1965	Rémy Achille Monceau
1965	1994	Bernard Edmond Lefevre
1994	2001	Marie-Hélène Michelet
2001	2014	Philippe Hourlier
2014	2020	Hubert Launois
2020	current	Yvan Lefevre

== Demography ==
The inhabitants of the commune are known as Avançonnais or Avançonnaises in French.

Historical population

Year	Pop.	±% p.a.
1793	475	—
1821	501	+0.19%
1846	492	−0.07%
1872	480	−0.09%
1901	404	−0.59%
1926	301	−1.17%
1946	292	−0.15%
1962	291	−0.02%
1968	262	−1.73%

Year	Pop.	±% p.a.
1975	258	−0.22%
1982	270	+0.65%
1990	322	+2.23%
1999	300	−0.78%
2007	318	+0.73%
2012	308	−0.64%
2017	313	+0.32%
2023	341	+1.44%

Source: EHESS and INSEE

== Culture and heritage ==
=== Religious heritage ===
The commune has one religious building that is registered as an historical monument:

- The Church of Saint Remi (13th century) The Church contains one item that is registered as an historical object:
  - An Eagle Lectern (18th century)

== Notable people linked to the commune ==
- Renée Mayot, medal engraver, born in 1947.

== See also ==
- Communes of the Ardennes department
