= Avançon =

Avançon is the name of several communes in France:

- Avançon, Hautes-Alpes, in the Hautes-Alpes department
- Avançon, Ardennes, in the Ardennes department

Avançon may also refer to:

== Rivers ==
- Avançon, a tributary of the River Rhône in the canton of Vaud, Switzerland
