= Seraincourt =

Seraincourt may refer to the following places in France:

- Seraincourt, Ardennes, a commune in the Ardennes department
- Seraincourt, Val-d'Oise, a commune in the Val-d'Oise department
