= Écly =

- Commune
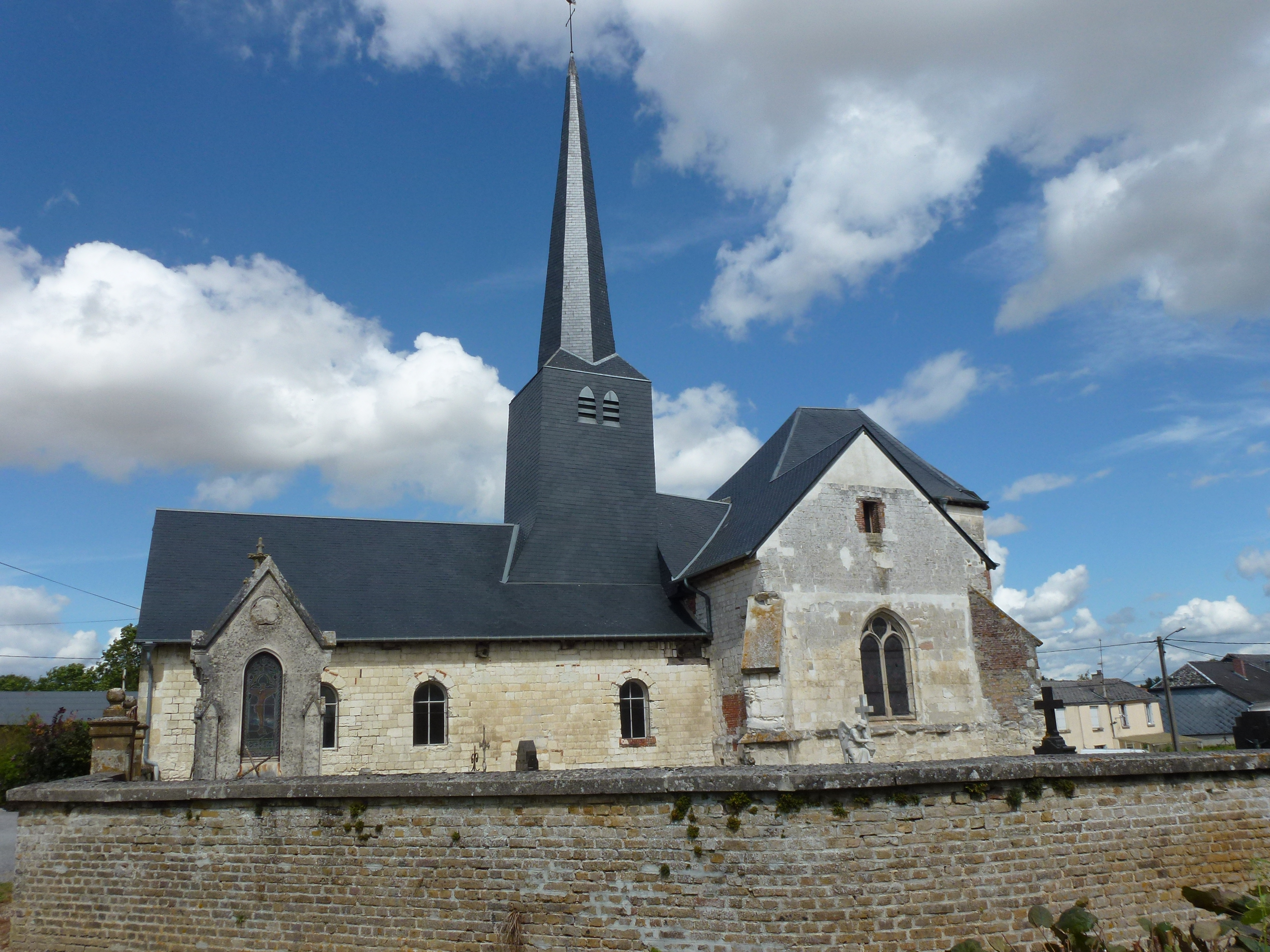
- The church in Écly
- Location of Écly
- Location within France Location within Grand Est
- Coordinates: 49°32′42″N 4°17′23″E
- Country: France
- Region: Grand Est
- Department: Ardennes
- Arrondissement: Rethel
- Canton: Château-Porcien

Government
  - Mayor (2020–2026): Ludovic Bugnet
- Area^{1}: 9.36 km^{2} (3.61 sq mi)
- Elevation: 72 m (236 ft)
- Population (2023): 169
  - Density: 18.1/km^{2} (46.8/sq mi)
- Time zone: UTC+01:00 (CET)
  - Summer (DST): UTC+02:00 (CEST)
- INSEE/Postal code: 08150 /08300
- ^{1} French Land Register data, which excludes lakes, ponds, glaciers > 1 km^{2} (0.386 sq mi or 247 acres) and river estuaries.

Écly (French pronunciation: [ekli]) is a commune in the Ardennes department in the Grand Est region in northern France.

== Population ==
Historical population
Year	Pop.	±% p.a.
1968	279	—
1975	251	−1.50%
1982	212	−2.38%
1990	191	−1.30%
1999	177	−0.84%
2007	180	+0.21%
2012	195	+1.61%
2017	176	−2.03%
2023	169	−0.67%
Source: INSEE

== See also ==
- Communes of the Ardennes department
