= Hannogne-Saint-Rémy =

- Commune
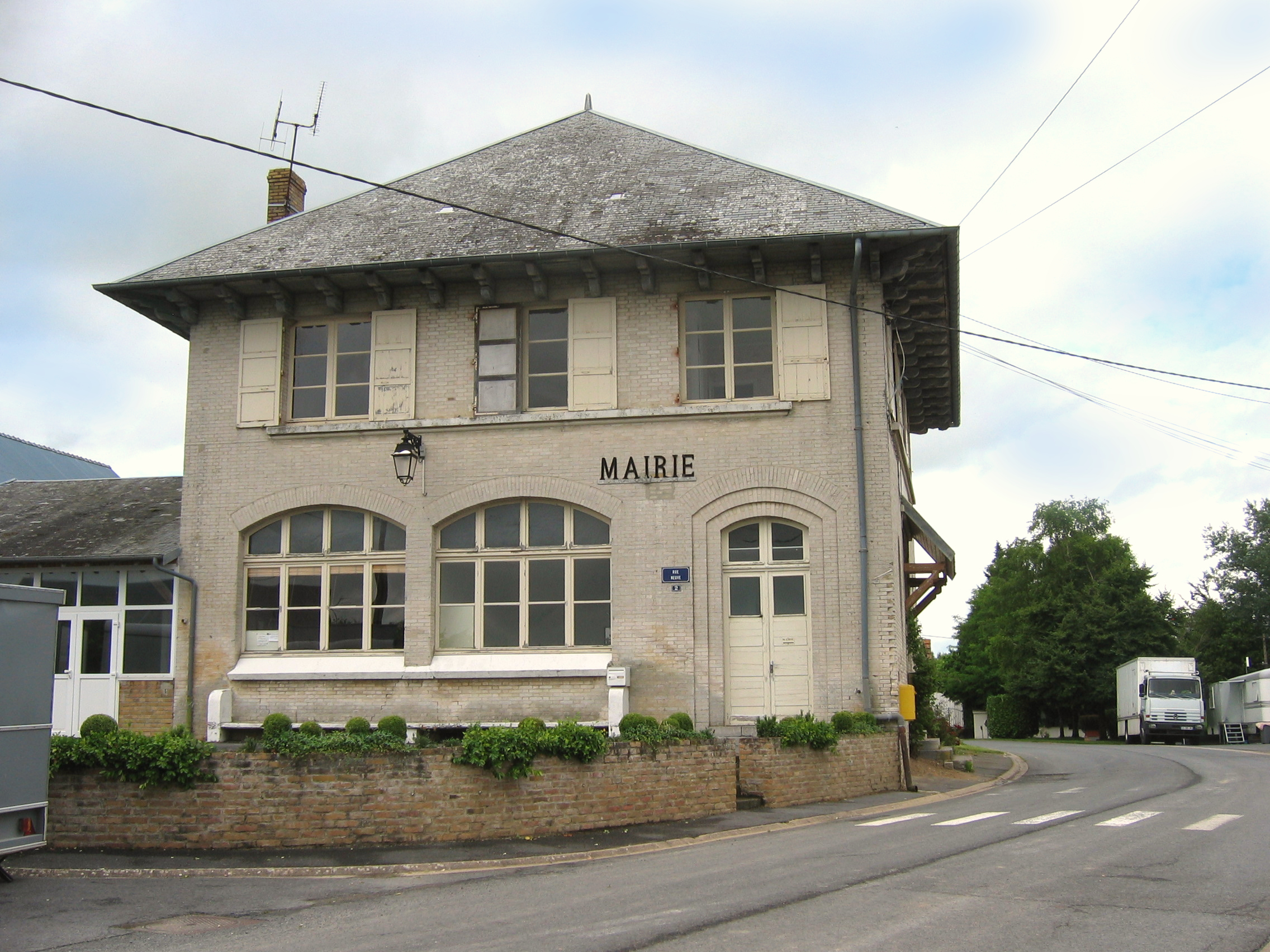
- The town hall in Hannogne-Saint-Rémy
- Location of Hannogne-Saint-Rémy
- Location within France Location within Grand Est
- Coordinates: 49°36′20″N 4°08′18″E
- Country: France
- Region: Grand Est
- Department: Ardennes
- Arrondissement: Rethel
- Canton: Château-Porcien

Government
  - Mayor (2020–2026): Gonzague Gerard
- Area^{1}: 18.09 km^{2} (6.98 sq mi)
- Elevation: 133 m (436 ft)
- Population (2023): 110
  - Density: 6.1/km^{2} (16/sq mi)
- Time zone: UTC+01:00 (CET)
  - Summer (DST): UTC+02:00 (CEST)
- INSEE/Postal code: 08210 /08220
- ^{1} French Land Register data, which excludes lakes, ponds, glaciers > 1 km^{2} (0.386 sq mi or 247 acres) and river estuaries.

Hannogne-Saint-Rémy (French pronunciation: [anɔɲ sɛ̃ ʁemi], before 1959: Hannogne) is a commune in the Ardennes department in northern France.

== Population ==
Historical population
Year	Pop.	±% p.a.
1968	213	—
1975	197	−1.11%
1982	165	−2.50%
1990	121	−3.80%
1999	104	−1.67%
2007	116	+1.37%
2012	113	−0.52%
2017	113	+0.00%
2023	110	−0.45%
Source: INSEE

== See also ==
- Communes of the Ardennes department
