= La Neuville-en-Tourne-à-Fuy =

- Commune
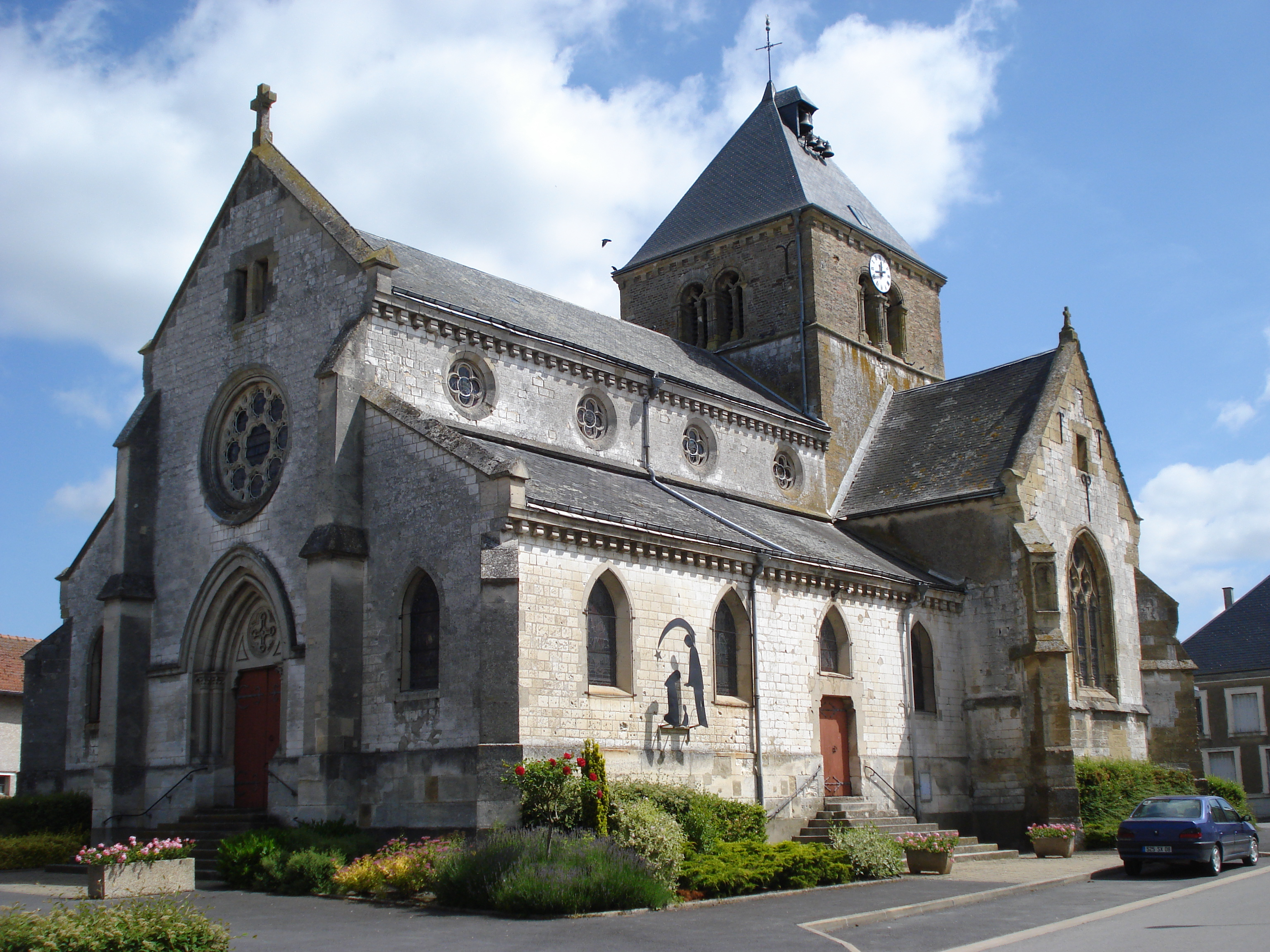
- The church in La Neuville-en-Tourne-à-Fuy
- Location of La Neuville-en-Tourne-à-Fuy
- Location within France Location within Grand Est
- Coordinates: 49°20′52″N 4°22′38″E
- Country: France
- Region: Grand Est
- Department: Ardennes
- Arrondissement: Rethel
- Canton: Château-Porcien

Government
  - Mayor (2020–2026): Mireille Leguay
- Area^{1}: 27.34 km^{2} (10.56 sq mi)
- Elevation: 134 m (440 ft)
- Highest elevation: 162 m (531 ft)
- Lowest elevation: 111 m (364 ft)
- Population (2023): 533
  - Density: 19.5/km^{2} (50.5/sq mi)
- Time zone: UTC+01:00 (CET)
  - Summer (DST): UTC+02:00 (CEST)
- INSEE/Postal code: 08320 /08310
- ^{1} French Land Register data, which excludes lakes, ponds, glaciers > 1 km^{2} (0.386 sq mi or 247 acres) and river estuaries.

La Neuville-en-Tourne-à-Fuy is a commune in the Ardennes department in northern France.

== Population ==
Historical population
Year	Pop.	±% p.a.
1968	472	—
1975	414	−1.86%
1982	386	−1.00%
1990	389	+0.10%
1999	362	−0.80%
2007	436	+2.35%
2012	573	+5.62%
2017	578	+0.17%
2023	533	−1.34%
Source: INSEE

== See also ==
- Communes of the Ardennes department
