= Saint-Quentin-le-Petit =

- Commune
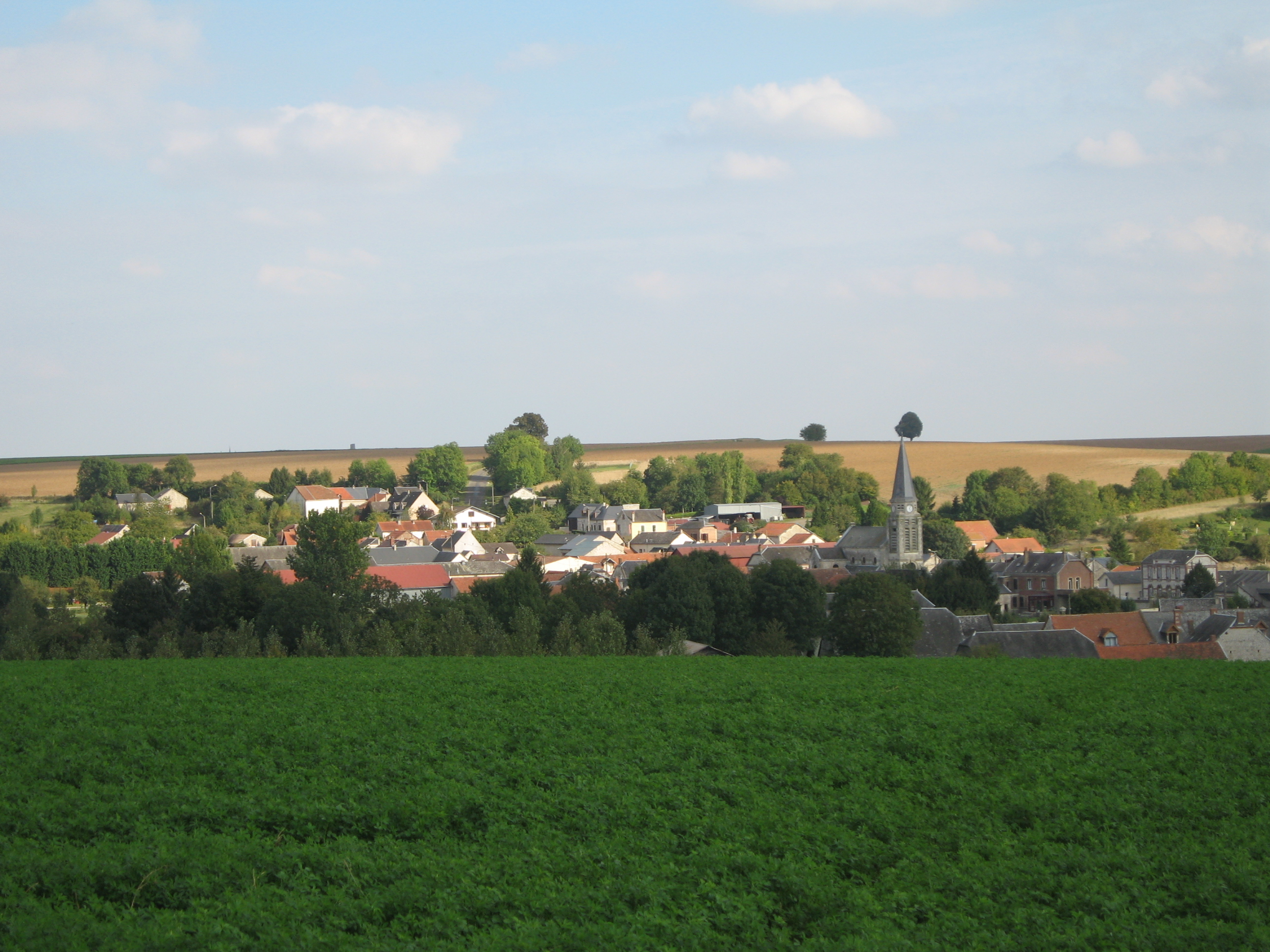
- A general view of Saint-Quentin
- Location of Saint-Quentin-le-Petit
- Location within France Location within Grand Est
- Coordinates: 49°35′04″N 4°04′47″E
- Country: France
- Region: Grand Est
- Department: Ardennes
- Arrondissement: Rethel
- Canton: Château-Porcien

Government
  - Mayor (2020–2026): Nathalie Fleiter
- Area^{1}: 8.95 km^{2} (3.46 sq mi)
- Elevation: 89 m (292 ft)
- Population (2023): 126
  - Density: 14.1/km^{2} (36.5/sq mi)
- Time zone: UTC+01:00 (CET)
  - Summer (DST): UTC+02:00 (CEST)
- INSEE/Postal code: 08396 /08220
- ^{1} French Land Register data, which excludes lakes, ponds, glaciers > 1 km^{2} (0.386 sq mi or 247 acres) and river estuaries.

Saint-Quentin-le-Petit (French pronunciation: [sɛ̃ kɑ̃tɛ̃ lə pəti]) is a commune in the Ardennes department in northern France.

== Population ==
Historical population
Year	Pop.	±% p.a.
1968	167	—
1975	131	−3.41%
1982	126	−0.55%
1990	163	+3.27%
1999	158	−0.35%
2007	151	−0.56%
2012	132	−2.65%
2017	120	−1.89%
2023	126	+0.82%
Source: INSEE

== See also ==
- Communes of the Ardennes department
