= Inaumont =

- Commune
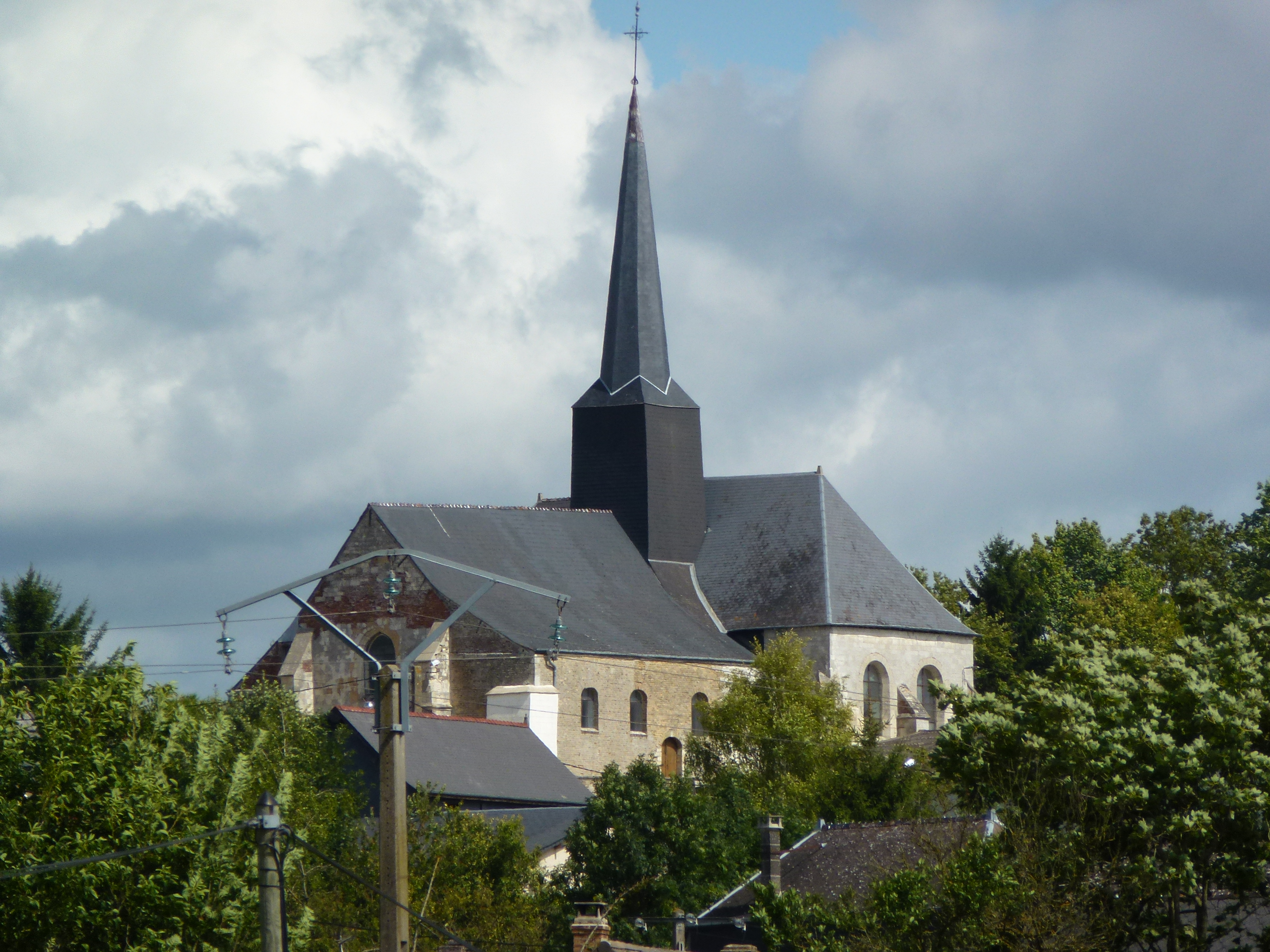
- The church in Inaumont

- Coat of arms
- Location of Inaumont
- Location within France Location within Grand Est
- Coordinates: 49°33′34″N 4°18′51″E
- Country: France
- Region: Grand Est
- Department: Ardennes
- Arrondissement: Rethel
- Canton: Château-Porcien

Government
  - Mayor (2020–2026): Michel Marcotte
- Area^{1}: 4.75 km^{2} (1.83 sq mi)
- Elevation: 98 m (322 ft)
- Population (2023): 138
  - Density: 29.1/km^{2} (75.2/sq mi)
- Time zone: UTC+01:00 (CET)
  - Summer (DST): UTC+02:00 (CEST)
- INSEE/Postal code: 08234 /08300
- ^{1} French Land Register data, which excludes lakes, ponds, glaciers > 1 km^{2} (0.386 sq mi or 247 acres) and river estuaries.

Inaumont (French pronunciation: [inomɔ̃]) is a commune in the Ardennes department in northern France.

== Population ==
Historical population
Year	Pop.	±% p.a.
1968	80	—
1975	60	−4.03%
1982	60	+0.00%
1990	67	+1.39%
1999	75	+1.26%
2007	66	−1.59%
2012	88	+5.92%
2017	99	+2.38%
2023	138	+5.69%
Source: INSEE

== See also ==
- Communes of the Ardennes department
