= Hauteville, Ardennes =

Hauteville
- Commune
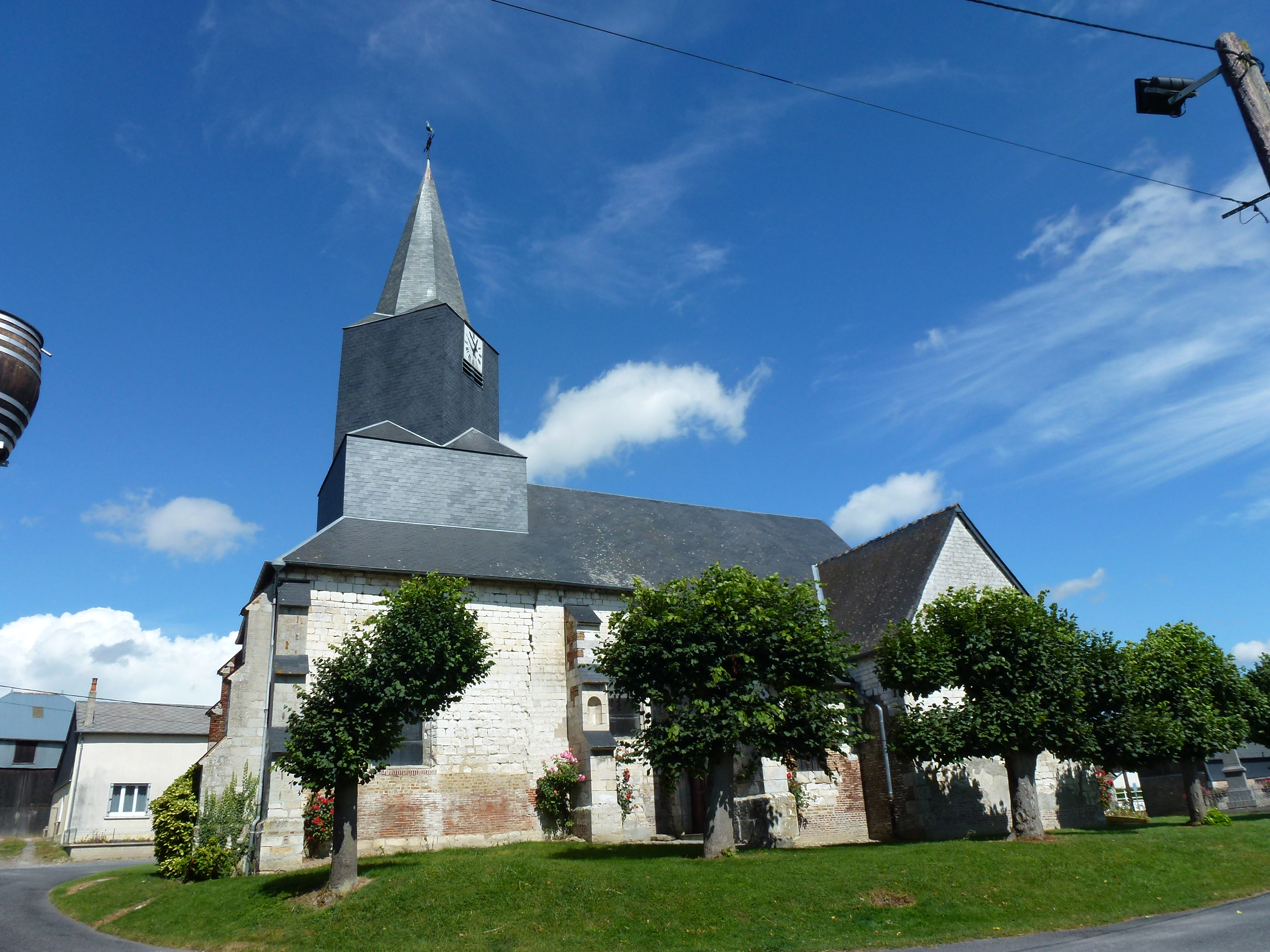
- The church in Hauteville
- Location of Hauteville
- Location within France Location within Grand Est
- Coordinates: 49°35′04″N 4°18′03″E
- Country: France
- Region: Grand Est
- Department: Ardennes
- Arrondissement: Rethel
- Canton: Château-Porcien
- Intercommunality: Pays Rethélois

Government
  - Mayor (2020–2026): Christelle Canon
- Area^{1}: 5.61 km^{2} (2.17 sq mi)
- Elevation: 86 m (282 ft)
- Population (2023): 119
  - Density: 21.2/km^{2} (54.9/sq mi)
- Time zone: UTC+01:00 (CET)
  - Summer (DST): UTC+02:00 (CEST)
- INSEE/Postal code: 08219 /08300
- ^{1} French Land Register data, which excludes lakes, ponds, glaciers > 1 km^{2} (0.386 sq mi or 247 acres) and river estuaries.

Hauteville (French pronunciation: [otvil]) is a commune in the Ardennes department and Grand Est region of north-eastern France.

== Population ==
Historical population
Year	Pop.	±% p.a.
1968	140	—
1975	123	−1.83%
1982	114	−1.08%
1990	121	+0.75%
1999	111	−0.95%
2007	114	+0.33%
2012	109	−0.89%
2017	108	−0.18%
2023	119	+1.63%
Source: INSEE

== See also ==
- Communes of the Ardennes department
