= Canton of Château-Porcien =

Canton of France

Coordinates: 49.53°N 4.24°E

- Canton
- Situation of the canton of Château-Porcien in the department of Ardennes
- Country: France
- Region: Grand Est
- Department: Ardennes
- No. of communes: {{{nbcomm}}}
- Population (2023): 15,794
- INSEE code: 0808

The canton of Château-Porcien is an administrative division of the Ardennes department, northern France. Its borders were modified at the French canton reorganisation which came into effect in March 2015. Its seat is in Château-Porcien.

It consists of the following communes:

1. Aire
2. Alincourt
3. Annelles
4. Asfeld
5. Aussonce
6. Avançon
7. Avaux
8. Balham
9. Banogne-Recouvrance
10. Bergnicourt
11. Bignicourt
12. Blanzy-la-Salonnaise
13. Brienne-sur-Aisne
14. Château-Porcien
15. Le Châtelet-sur-Retourne
16. Condé-lès-Herpy
17. L'Écaille
18. Écly
19. Gomont
20. Hannogne-Saint-Rémy
21. Hauteville
22. Herpy-l'Arlésienne
23. Houdilcourt
24. Inaumont
25. Juniville
26. Ménil-Annelles
27. Ménil-Lépinois
28. Neuflize
29. La Neuville-en-Tourne-à-Fuy
30. Perthes
31. Poilcourt-Sydney
32. Roizy
33. Saint-Fergeux
34. Saint-Germainmont
35. Saint-Loup-en-Champagne
36. Saint-Quentin-le-Petit
37. Saint-Remy-le-Petit
38. Sault-Saint-Remy
39. Seraincourt
40. Sévigny-Waleppe
41. Son
42. Tagnon
43. Taizy
44. Le Thour
45. Vieux-lès-Asfeld
46. Villers-devant-le-Thour
47. Ville-sur-Retourne
