= Condé-lès-Herpy =

- Commune
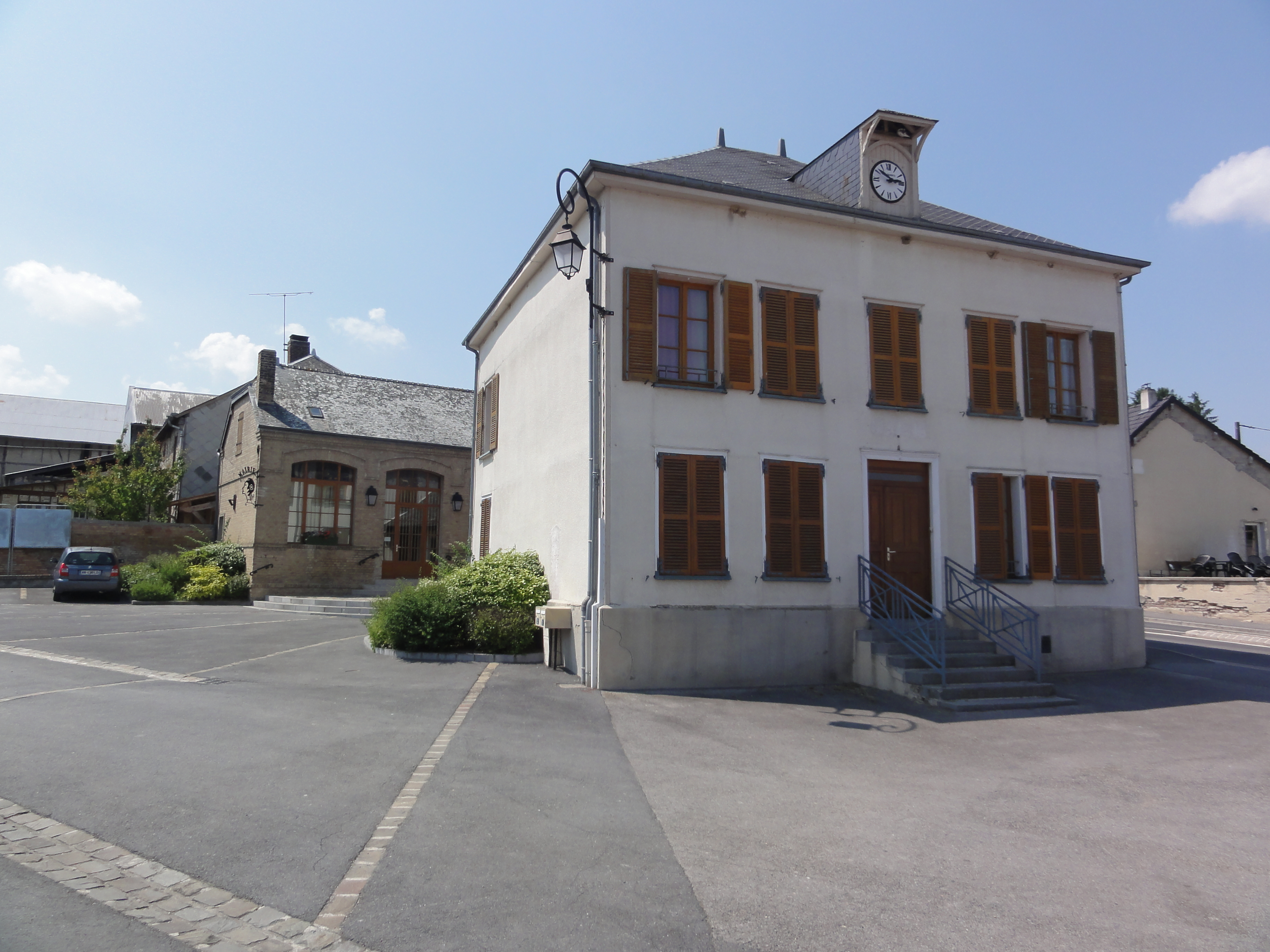
- Town hall
- Location of Condé-lès-Herpy
- Location within France Location within Grand Est
- Coordinates: 49°31′45″N 4°13′30″E
- Country: France
- Region: Grand Est
- Department: Ardennes
- Arrondissement: Rethel
- Canton: Château-Porcien

Government
  - Mayor (2020–2026): Bernard Rousseaux
- Area^{1}: 11.55 km^{2} (4.46 sq mi)
- Elevation: 76 m (249 ft)
- Population (2023): 218
  - Density: 18.9/km^{2} (48.9/sq mi)
- Time zone: UTC+01:00 (CET)
  - Summer (DST): UTC+02:00 (CEST)
- INSEE/Postal code: 08126 /08360
- ^{1} French Land Register data, which excludes lakes, ponds, glaciers > 1 km^{2} (0.386 sq mi or 247 acres) and river estuaries.

Condé-lès-Herpy is a commune in the Ardennes department in northern France.

== Population ==
Historical population
Year	Pop.	±% p.a.
1968	137	—
1975	118	−2.11%
1982	139	+2.37%
1990	172	+2.70%
1999	159	−0.87%
2007	188	+2.12%
2012	217	+2.91%
2017	217	+0.00%
2023	218	+0.08%
Source: INSEE

== See also ==
- Communes of the Ardennes department
