= Tagnon =

- Commune
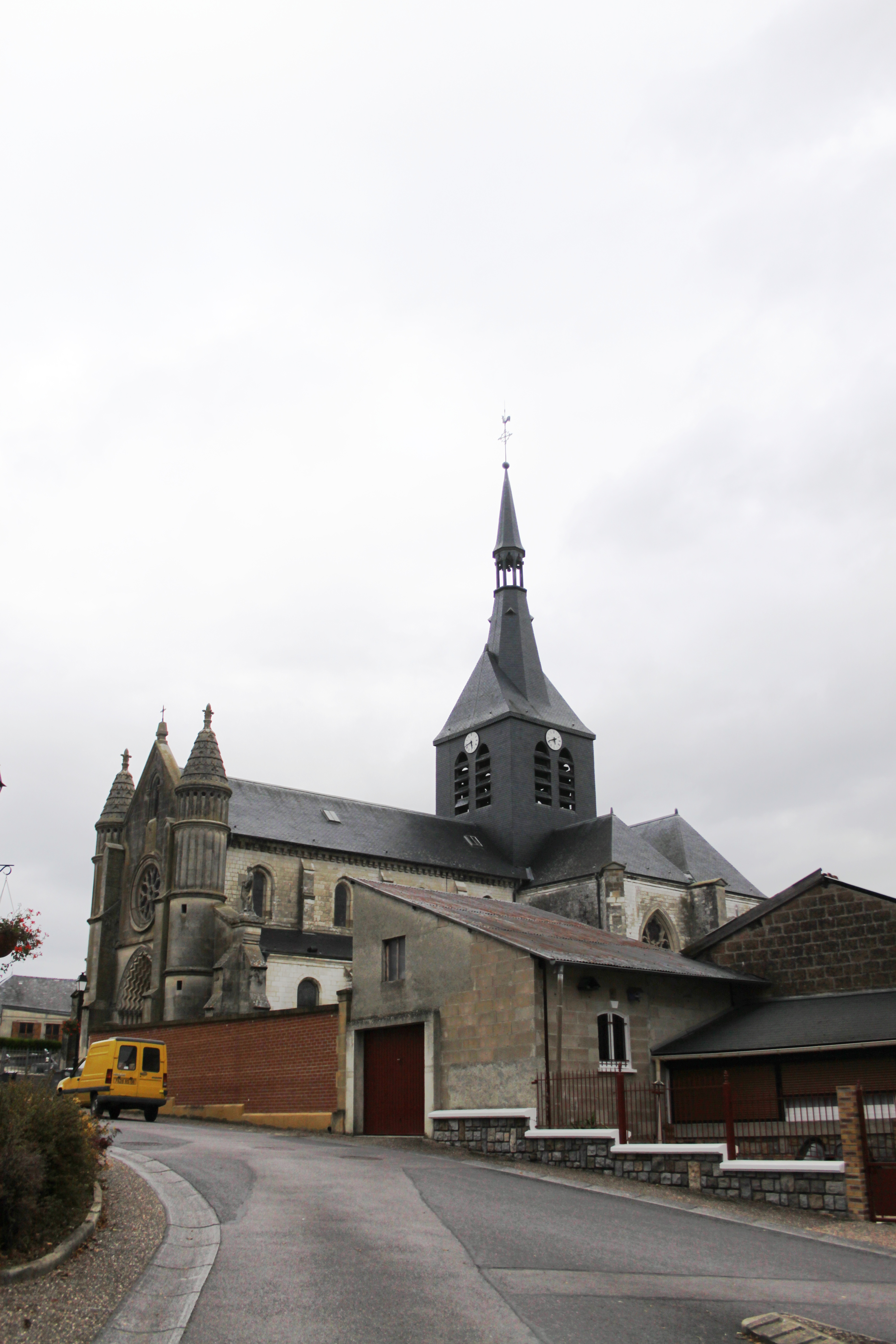
- The church in Tagnon

- Coat of arms
- Location of Tagnon
- Location within France Location within Grand Est
- Coordinates: 49°26′25″N 4°17′27″E
- Country: France
- Region: Grand Est
- Department: Ardennes
- Arrondissement: Rethel
- Canton: Château-Porcien
- Intercommunality: Pays Rethélois

Government
  - Mayor (2020–2026): Monique Misset
- Area^{1}: 23.97 km^{2} (9.25 sq mi)
- Elevation: 105 m (344 ft)
- Highest elevation: 148 m (486 ft)
- Lowest elevation: 83 m (272 ft)
- Population (2023): 901
  - Density: 37.6/km^{2} (97.4/sq mi)
- Time zone: UTC+01:00 (CET)
  - Summer (DST): UTC+02:00 (CEST)
- INSEE/Postal code: 08435 /08300
- ^{1} French Land Register data, which excludes lakes, ponds, glaciers > 1 km^{2} (0.386 sq mi or 247 acres) and river estuaries.

Tagnon (French pronunciation: [taɲɔ̃]) is a commune in the Ardennes department in northern France.

== Population ==
Historical population
| Year | Pop. | ±% p.a. |
|---|---|---|
| 1968 | 862 | — |
| 1975 | 825 | −0.62% |
| 1982 | 790 | −0.62% |
| 1990 | 732 | −0.95% |
| 1999 | 743 | +0.17% |
| 2007 | 932 | +2.87% |
| 2012 | 919 | −0.28% |
| 2017 | 884 | −0.77% |
| 2023 | 901 | +0.32% |
Source: INSEE

== See also ==
- Communes of the Ardennes department
