= Saint-Fergeux =

- Commune
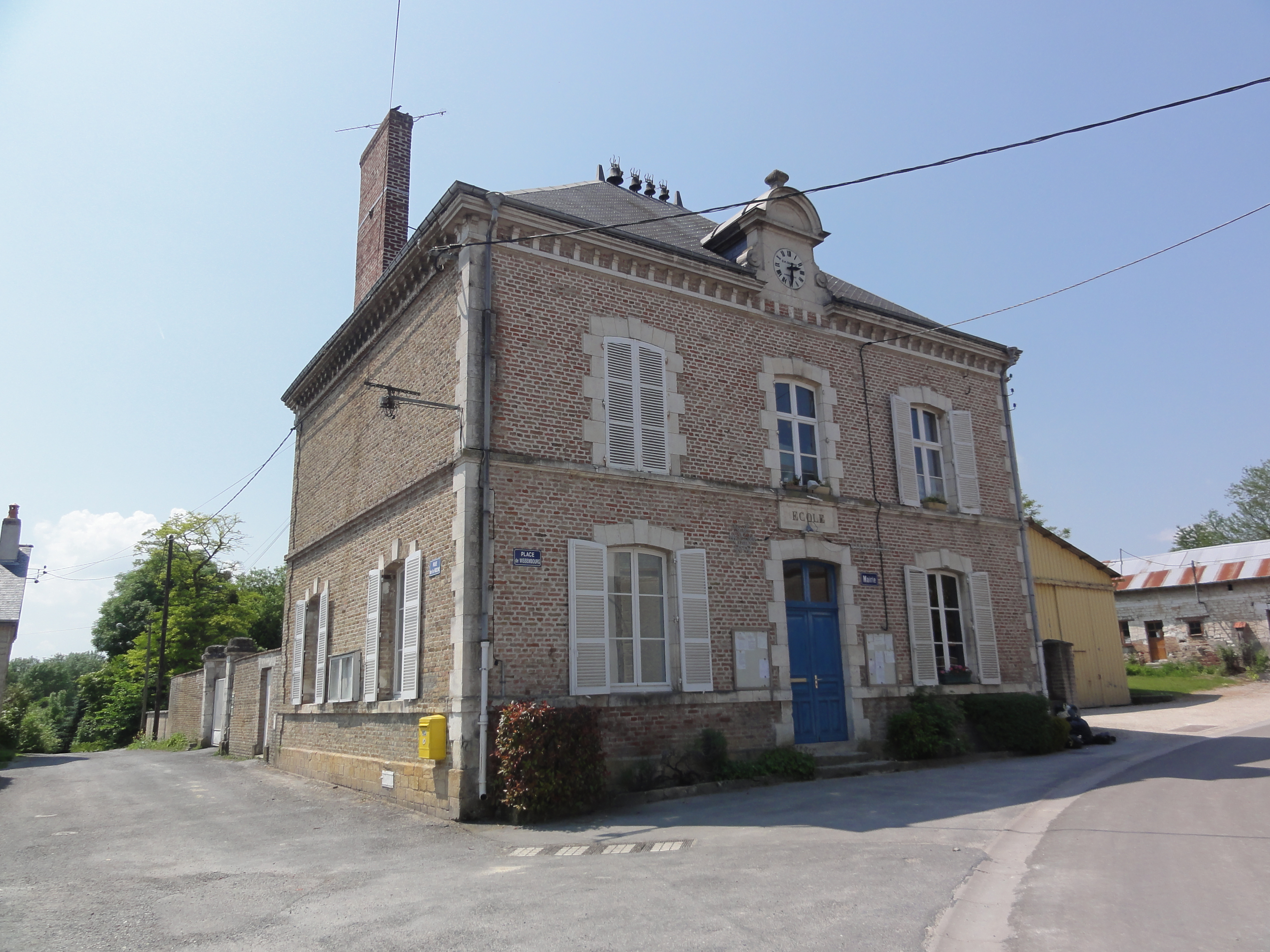
- The town hall in Saint-Fergeux

- Coat of arms
- Location of Saint-Fergeux
- Location within France Location within Grand Est
- Coordinates: 49°33′50″N 4°12′49″E
- Country: France
- Region: Grand Est
- Department: Ardennes
- Arrondissement: Rethel
- Canton: Château-Porcien

Government
  - Mayor (2020–2026): David Vilain
- Area^{1}: 25.5 km^{2} (9.8 sq mi)
- Elevation: 100 m (330 ft)
- Population (2023): 213
  - Density: 8.35/km^{2} (21.6/sq mi)
- Time zone: UTC+01:00 (CET)
  - Summer (DST): UTC+02:00 (CEST)
- INSEE/Postal code: 08380 /08360
- ^{1} French Land Register data, which excludes lakes, ponds, glaciers > 1 km^{2} (0.386 sq mi or 247 acres) and river estuaries.

Saint-Fergeux is a commune in the Ardennes department in northern France.

== Population ==
Historical population
Year	Pop.	±% p.a.
1968	309	—
1975	253	−2.82%
1982	207	−2.83%
1990	203	−0.24%
1999	197	−0.33%
2007	197	+0.00%
2012	201	+0.40%
2017	210	+0.88%
2023	213	+0.24%
Source: INSEE

== See also ==
- Communes of the Ardennes department
