= Ménil-Annelles =

- Commune
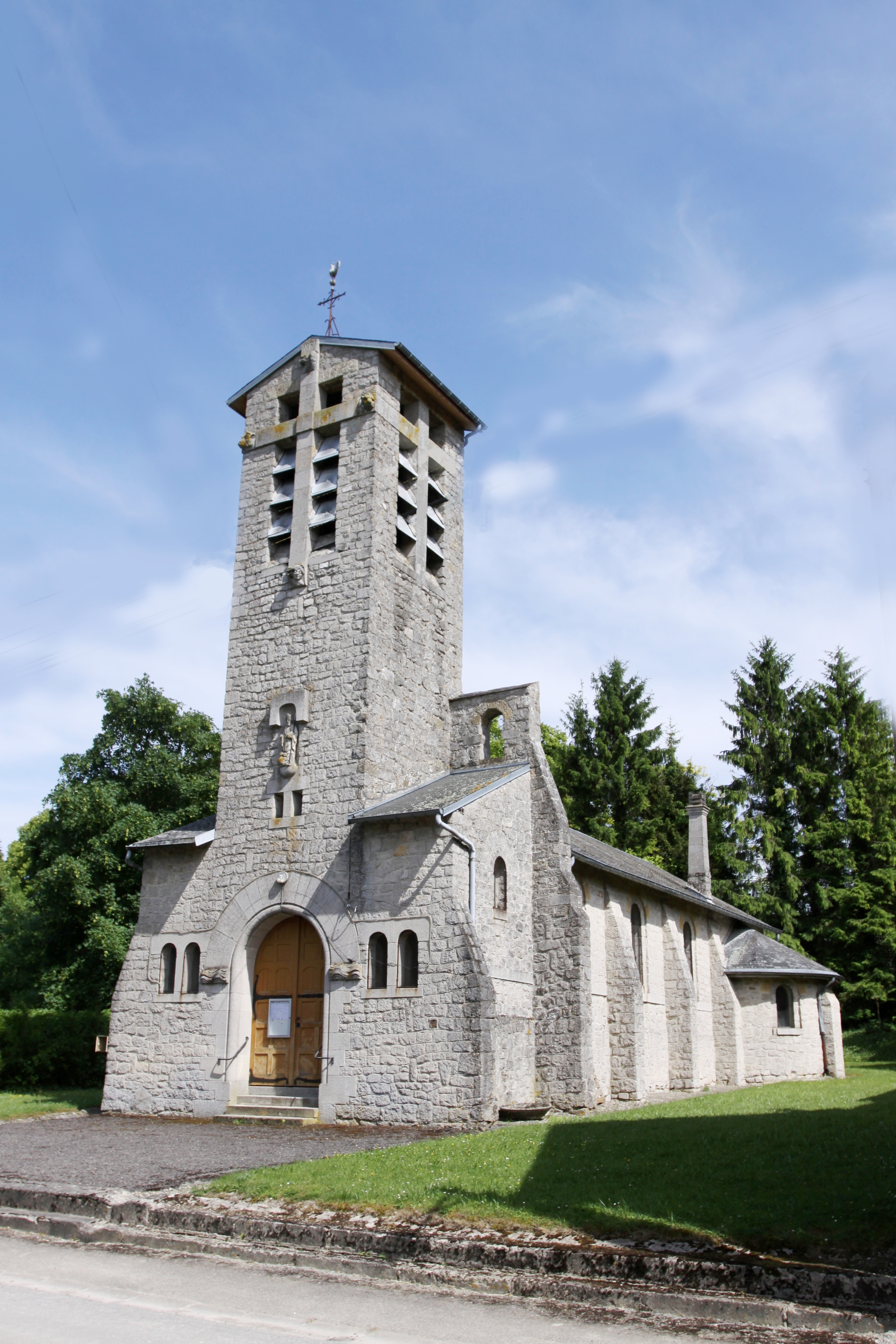
- The church in Ménil-Annelles
- Location of Ménil-Annelles
- Location within France Location within Grand Est
- Coordinates: 49°26′25″N 4°26′44″E
- Country: France
- Region: Grand Est
- Department: Ardennes
- Arrondissement: Rethel
- Canton: Château-Porcien

Government
  - Mayor (2022–2026): Christophe Mahaut
- Area^{1}: 9.15 km^{2} (3.53 sq mi)
- Elevation: 125 m (410 ft)
- Highest elevation: 165 m (541 ft)
- Lowest elevation: 107 m (351 ft)
- Population (2023): 95
  - Density: 10/km^{2} (27/sq mi)
- Time zone: UTC+01:00 (CET)
  - Summer (DST): UTC+02:00 (CEST)
- INSEE/Postal code: 08286 /08310
- ^{1} French Land Register data, which excludes lakes, ponds, glaciers > 1 km^{2} (0.386 sq mi or 247 acres) and river estuaries.

Ménil-Annelles (French pronunciation: [menil anɛl]) is a commune in the Ardennes department in northern France.

== Population ==
Historical population
Year	Pop.	±% p.a.
1968	161	—
1975	135	−2.48%
1982	120	−1.67%
1990	113	−0.75%
1999	119	+0.58%
2007	96	−2.65%
2012	102	+1.22%
2017	108	+1.15%
2023	95	−2.11%
Source: INSEE

== See also ==
- Communes of the Ardennes department
