= Herpy-l'Arlésienne =

- Commune
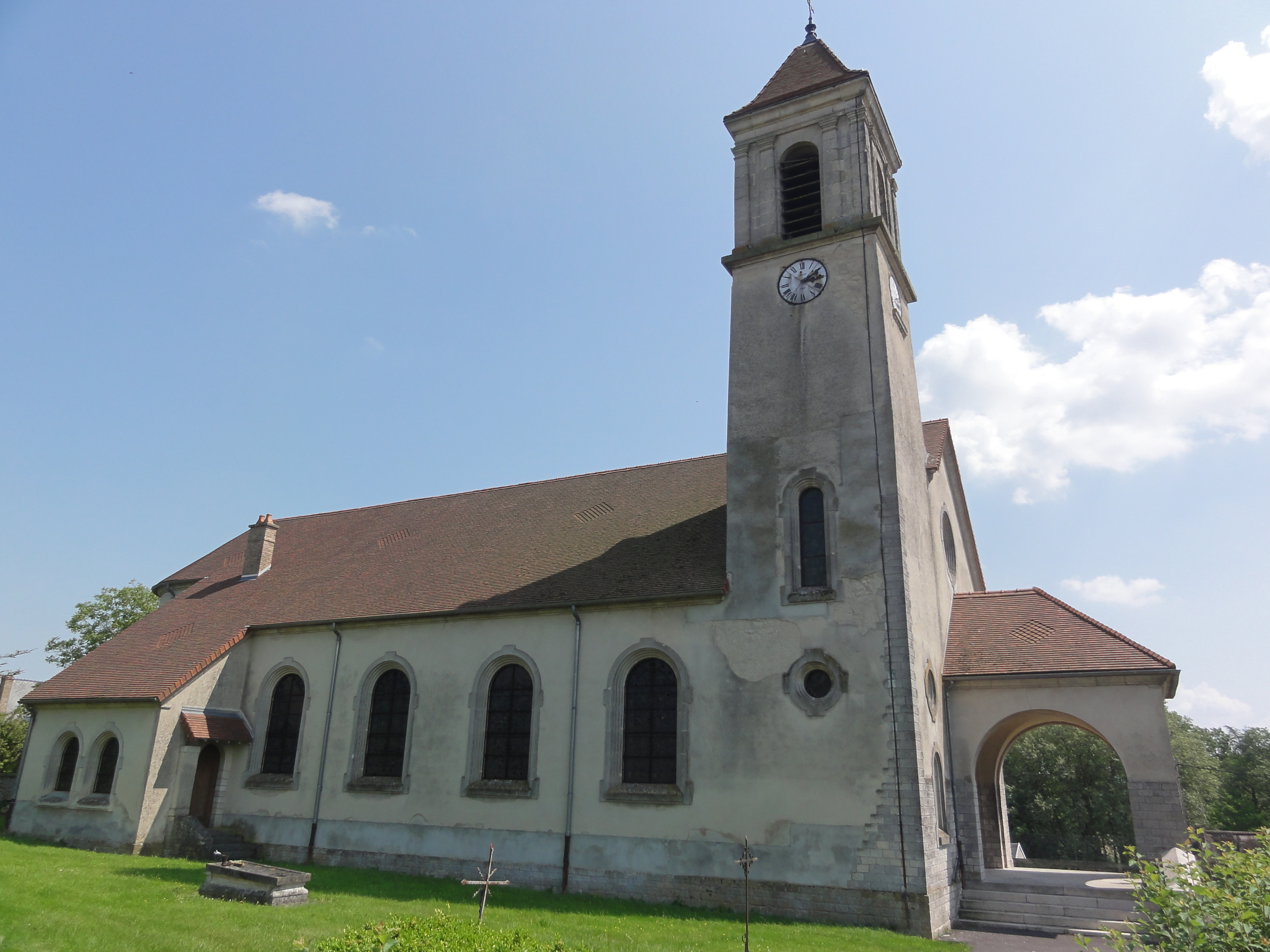
- The church in Herpy-l'Arlésienne
- Location of Herpy-l'Arlésienne
- Location within France Location within Grand Est
- Coordinates: 49°31′26″N 4°12′34″E
- Country: France
- Region: Grand Est
- Department: Ardennes
- Arrondissement: Rethel
- Canton: Château-Porcien

Government
  - Mayor (2020–2026): Claude Régnier
- Area^{1}: 10.64 km^{2} (4.11 sq mi)
- Elevation: 78 m (256 ft)
- Population (2023): 208
  - Density: 19.5/km^{2} (50.6/sq mi)
- Time zone: UTC+01:00 (CET)
  - Summer (DST): UTC+02:00 (CEST)
- INSEE/Postal code: 08225 /08360
- ^{1} French Land Register data, which excludes lakes, ponds, glaciers > 1 km^{2} (0.386 sq mi or 247 acres) and river estuaries.

Herpy-l'Arlésienne is a commune in the Ardennes department in northern France.

== Population ==
Historical population
Year	Pop.	±% p.a.
1968	181	—
1975	139	−3.70%
1982	161	+2.12%
1990	158	−0.23%
1999	155	−0.21%
2007	185	+2.24%
2012	205	+2.07%
2017	199	−0.59%
2023	208	+0.74%
Source: INSEE

== See also ==
- Communes of the Ardennes department
