= Le Châtelet-sur-Retourne =

- Commune
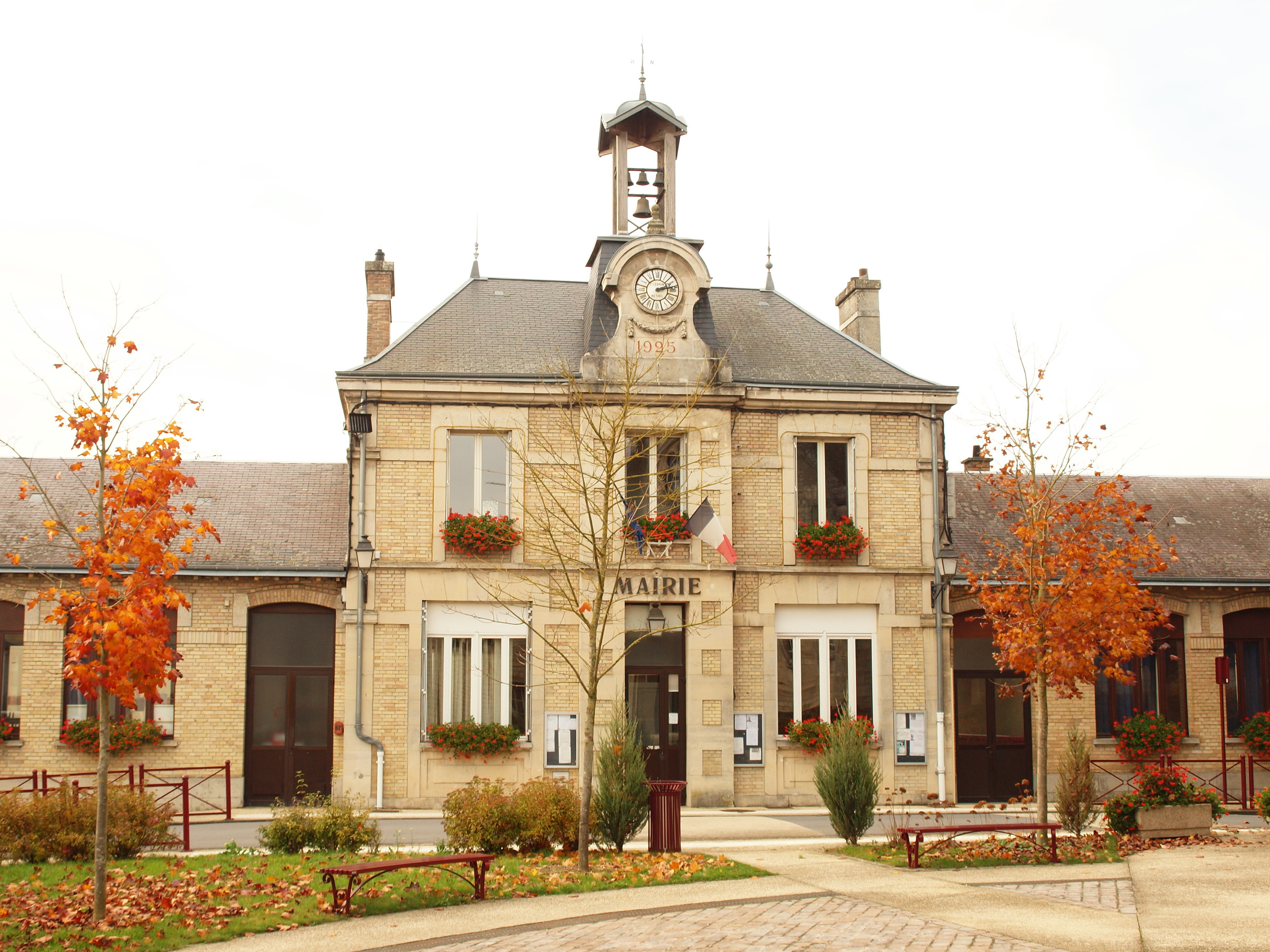
- The town hall in Le Châtelet-sur-Retourne

- Coat of arms
- Location of Le Châtelet-sur-Retourne
- Location within France Location within Grand Est
- Coordinates: 49°25′03″N 4°16′45″E
- Country: France
- Region: Grand Est
- Department: Ardennes
- Arrondissement: Rethel
- Canton: Château-Porcien

Government
  - Mayor (2020–2026): Jean-Michel Mavel
- Area^{1}: 9.94 km^{2} (3.84 sq mi)
- Elevation: 85 m (279 ft)
- Highest elevation: 143 m (469 ft)
- Lowest elevation: 77 m (253 ft)
- Population (2023): 774
  - Density: 77.9/km^{2} (202/sq mi)
- Time zone: UTC+01:00 (CET)
  - Summer (DST): UTC+02:00 (CEST)
- INSEE/Postal code: 08111 /08300
- ^{1} French Land Register data, which excludes lakes, ponds, glaciers > 1 km^{2} (0.386 sq mi or 247 acres) and river estuaries.

Le Châtelet-sur-Retourne (French pronunciation: [lə ʃatlɛ syʁ ʁətuʁn]) is a commune in the Ardennes department in northern France.

== Population ==
Historical population
Year	Pop.	±% p.a.
1968	398	—
1975	339	−2.27%
1982	362	+0.94%
1990	568	+5.79%
1999	528	−0.81%
2007	533	+0.12%
2012	727	+6.40%
2017	794	+1.78%
2023	774	−0.42%
Source: INSEE

== See also ==
- Communes of the Ardennes department
