= Ménil-Lépinois =

- Commune
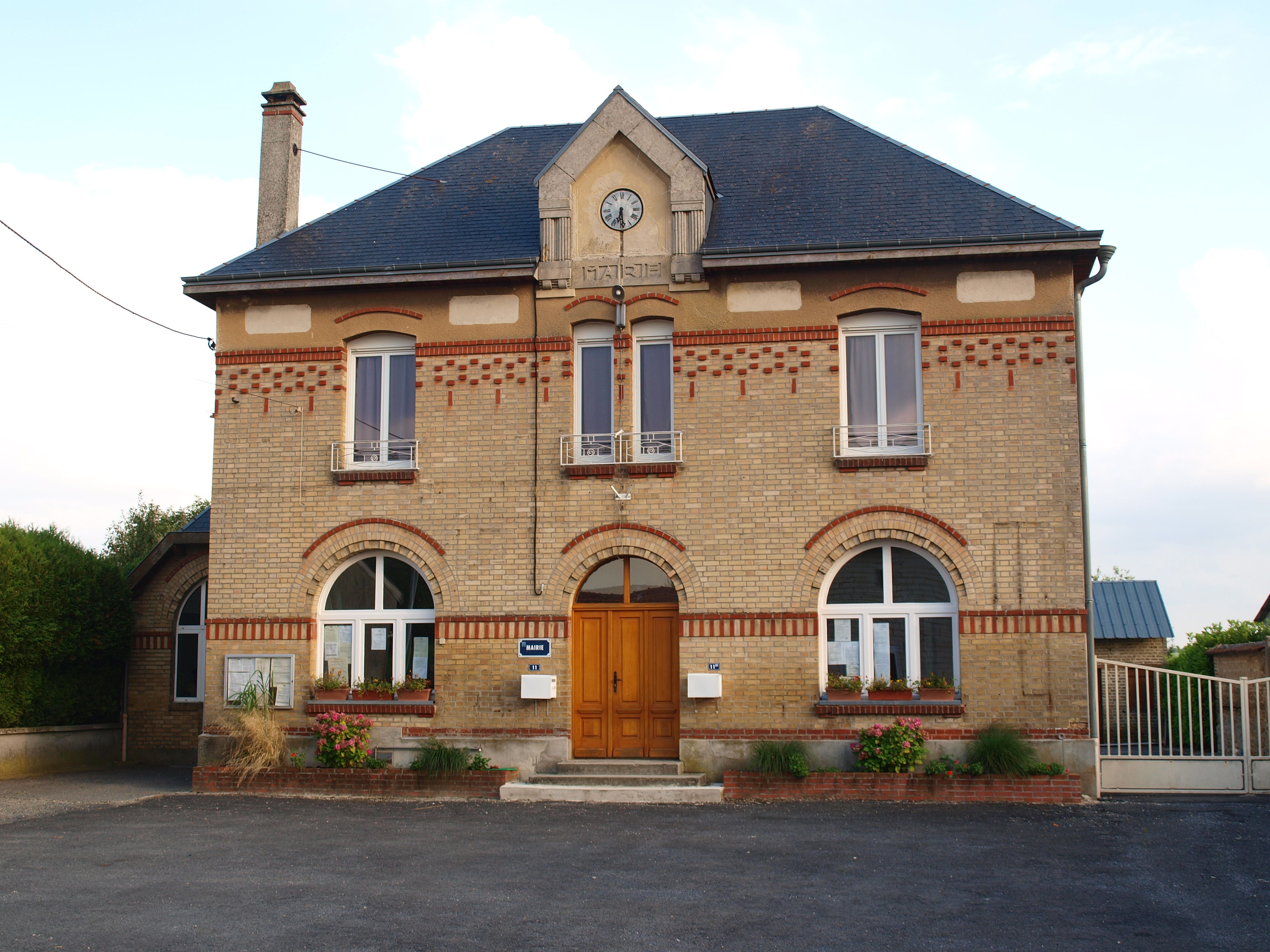
- The town hall in Ménil-Lépinois

- Coat of arms
- Location of Ménil-Lépinois
- Location within France Location within Grand Est
- Coordinates: 49°22′46″N 4°17′08″E
- Country: France
- Region: Grand Est
- Department: Ardennes
- Arrondissement: Rethel
- Canton: Château-Porcien

Government
  - Mayor (2020–2026): Muriel Holigner
- Area^{1}: 18.01 km^{2} (6.95 sq mi)
- Elevation: 115 m (377 ft)
- Highest elevation: 159 m (522 ft)
- Lowest elevation: 94 m (308 ft)
- Population (2023): 148
  - Density: 8.22/km^{2} (21.3/sq mi)
- Time zone: UTC+01:00 (CET)
  - Summer (DST): UTC+02:00 (CEST)
- INSEE/Postal code: 08287 /08310
- ^{1} French Land Register data, which excludes lakes, ponds, glaciers > 1 km^{2} (0.386 sq mi or 247 acres) and river estuaries.

Ménil-Lépinois (French pronunciation: [menil lepinwa]) is a commune in the Ardennes department in northern France.

== Population ==
Historical population
| Year | Pop. | ±% p.a. |
|---|---|---|
| 1968 | 108 | — |
| 1975 | 86 | −3.20% |
| 1982 | 104 | +2.75% |
| 1990 | 103 | −0.12% |
| 1999 | 92 | −1.25% |
| 2007 | 96 | +0.53% |
| 2012 | 142 | +8.14% |
| 2017 | 136 | −0.86% |
| 2023 | 148 | +1.42% |
Source: INSEE

== See also ==
- Communes of the Ardennes department
