= Son, Ardennes =

Son
- Commune
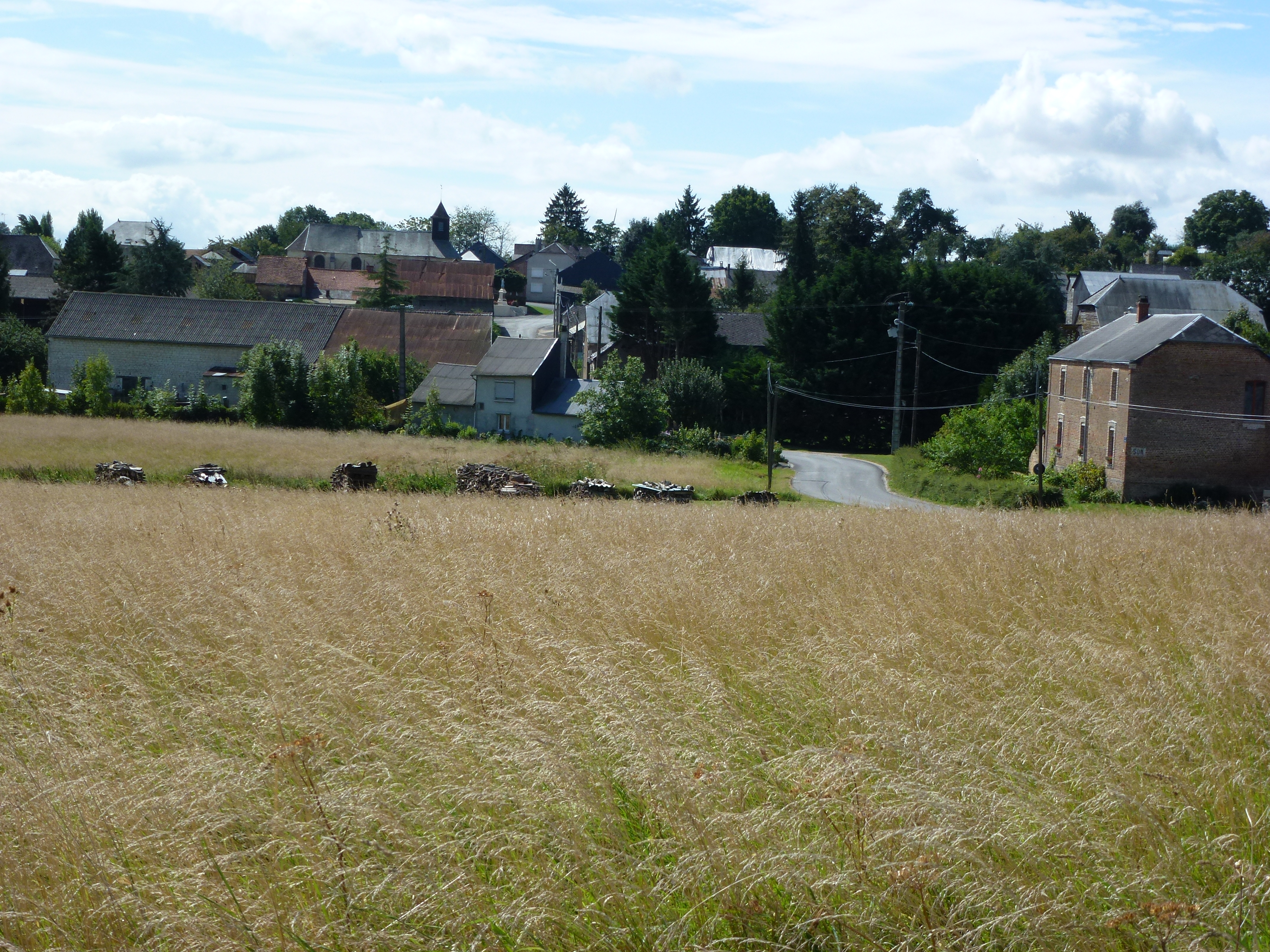
- A general view of Son
- Location of Son
- Location within France Location within Grand Est
- Coordinates: 49°34′57″N 4°16′37″E
- Country: France
- Region: Grand Est
- Department: Ardennes
- Arrondissement: Rethel
- Canton: Château-Porcien

Government
  - Mayor (2020–2026): Thierry Kudla
- Area^{1}: 9.03 km^{2} (3.49 sq mi)
- Elevation: 103 m (338 ft)
- Population (2023): 89
  - Density: 9.9/km^{2} (26/sq mi)
- Time zone: UTC+01:00 (CET)
  - Summer (DST): UTC+02:00 (CEST)
- INSEE/Postal code: 08426 /08300
- ^{1} French Land Register data, which excludes lakes, ponds, glaciers > 1 km^{2} (0.386 sq mi or 247 acres) and river estuaries.

Son (French pronunciation: [sɔ̃]) is a commune in the Ardennes department in northern France.

== Population ==
Historical population
Year	Pop.	±% p.a.
1968	122	—
1975	114	−0.96%
1982	114	+0.00%
1990	110	−0.45%
1999	105	−0.52%
2007	96	−1.11%
2012	97	+0.21%
2017	99	+0.41%
2023	89	−1.76%
Source: INSEE

== See also ==
- Communes of the Ardennes department
