= Ville-sur-Retourne =

- Commune
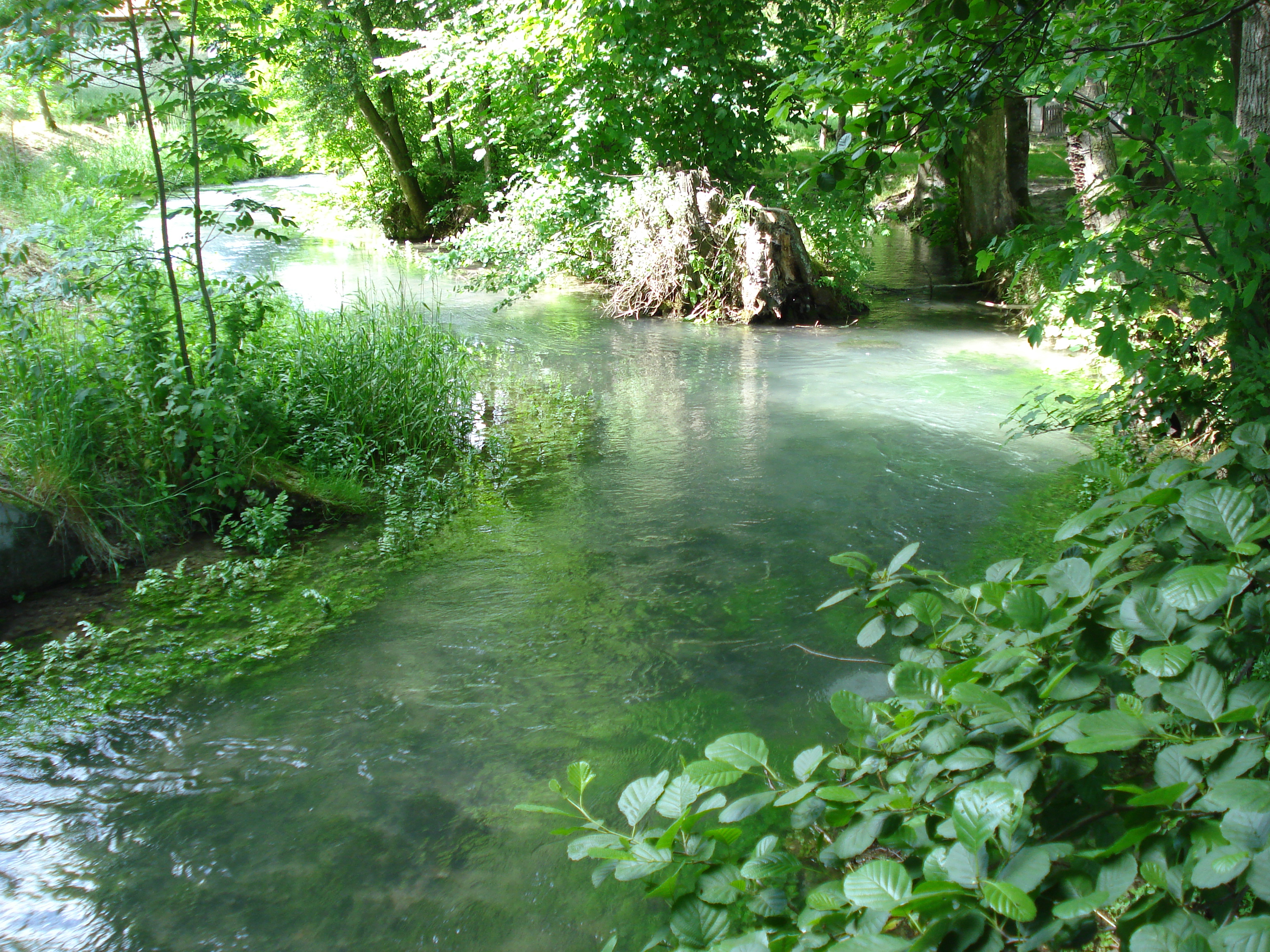
- Retourne River
- Location of Ville-sur-Retourne
- Location within France Location within Grand Est
- Coordinates: 49°23′48″N 4°26′49″E
- Country: France
- Region: Grand Est
- Department: Ardennes
- Arrondissement: Rethel
- Canton: Château-Porcien

Government
  - Mayor (2020–2026): Frédéric Verzeaux
- Area^{1}: 9.56 km^{2} (3.69 sq mi)
- Elevation: 104 m (341 ft)
- Highest elevation: 149 m (489 ft)
- Lowest elevation: 94 m (308 ft)
- Population (2023): 73
  - Density: 7.6/km^{2} (20/sq mi)
- Time zone: UTC+01:00 (CET)
  - Summer (DST): UTC+02:00 (CEST)
- INSEE/Postal code: 08484 /08310
- ^{1} French Land Register data, which excludes lakes, ponds, glaciers > 1 km^{2} (0.386 sq mi or 247 acres) and river estuaries.

Ville-sur-Retourne (French pronunciation: [vil syʁ ʁətuʁn]) is a commune in the Ardennes department in northern France.

== Population ==
Historical population
Year	Pop.	±% p.a.
1968	101	—
1975	96	−0.72%
1982	92	−0.61%
1990	99	+0.92%
1999	88	−1.30%
2007	74	−2.14%
2012	73	−0.27%
2017	83	+2.60%
2023	73	−2.12%
Source: INSEE

== See also ==
- Communes of the Ardennes department
