= Perthes, Ardennes =

Perthes
- Commune
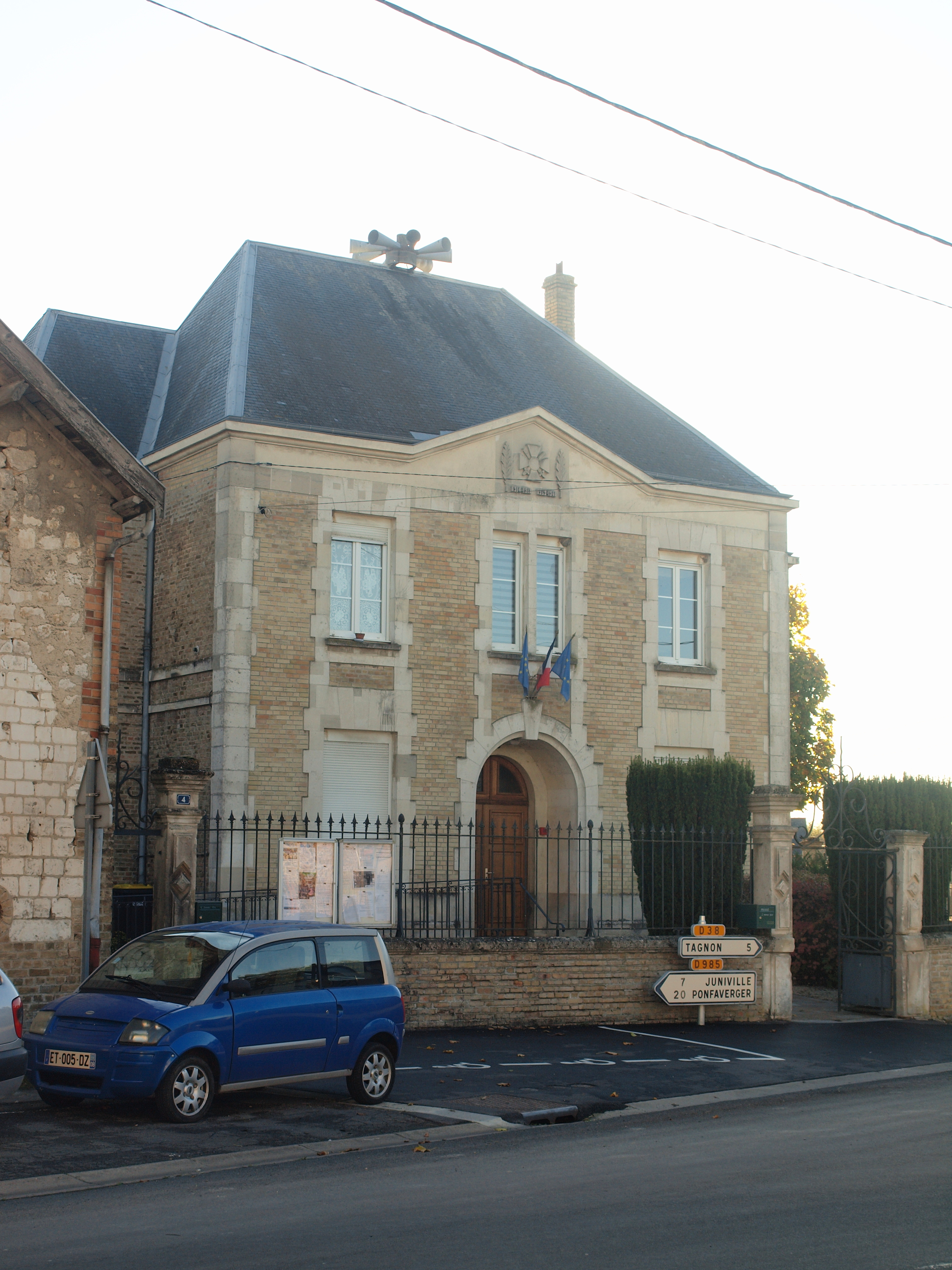
- The town hall in Perthes

- Coat of arms
- Location of Perthes
- Location within France Location within Grand Est
- Coordinates: 49°27′01″N 4°21′05″E
- Country: France
- Region: Grand Est
- Department: Ardennes
- Arrondissement: Rethel
- Canton: Château-Porcien
- Intercommunality: Pays Rethélois

Government
  - Mayor (2020–2026): Pascal Turquin
- Area^{1}: 23.41 km^{2} (9.04 sq mi)
- Elevation: 132 m (433 ft)
- Highest elevation: 158 m (518 ft)
- Lowest elevation: 86 m (282 ft)
- Population (2023): 303
  - Density: 12.9/km^{2} (33.5/sq mi)
- Time zone: UTC+01:00 (CET)
  - Summer (DST): UTC+02:00 (CEST)
- INSEE/Postal code: 08339 /08300
- ^{1} French Land Register data, which excludes lakes, ponds, glaciers > 1 km^{2} (0.386 sq mi or 247 acres) and river estuaries.

Perthes (French pronunciation: [pɛʁt]) is a commune in the Ardennes department and Grand Est region of north-eastern France.

It was the site of a minor skirmish in the First Battle of Champagne, fought on 20 December 1914.

== Population ==
Historical population
Year	Pop.	±% p.a.
1968	351	—
1975	309	−1.80%
1982	294	−0.71%
1990	285	−0.39%
1999	277	−0.32%
2007	287	+0.44%
2012	301	+0.96%
2017	309	+0.53%
2023	303	−0.33%
Source: INSEE

== See also ==
- Communes of the Ardennes department
