= Bignicourt =

- Commune
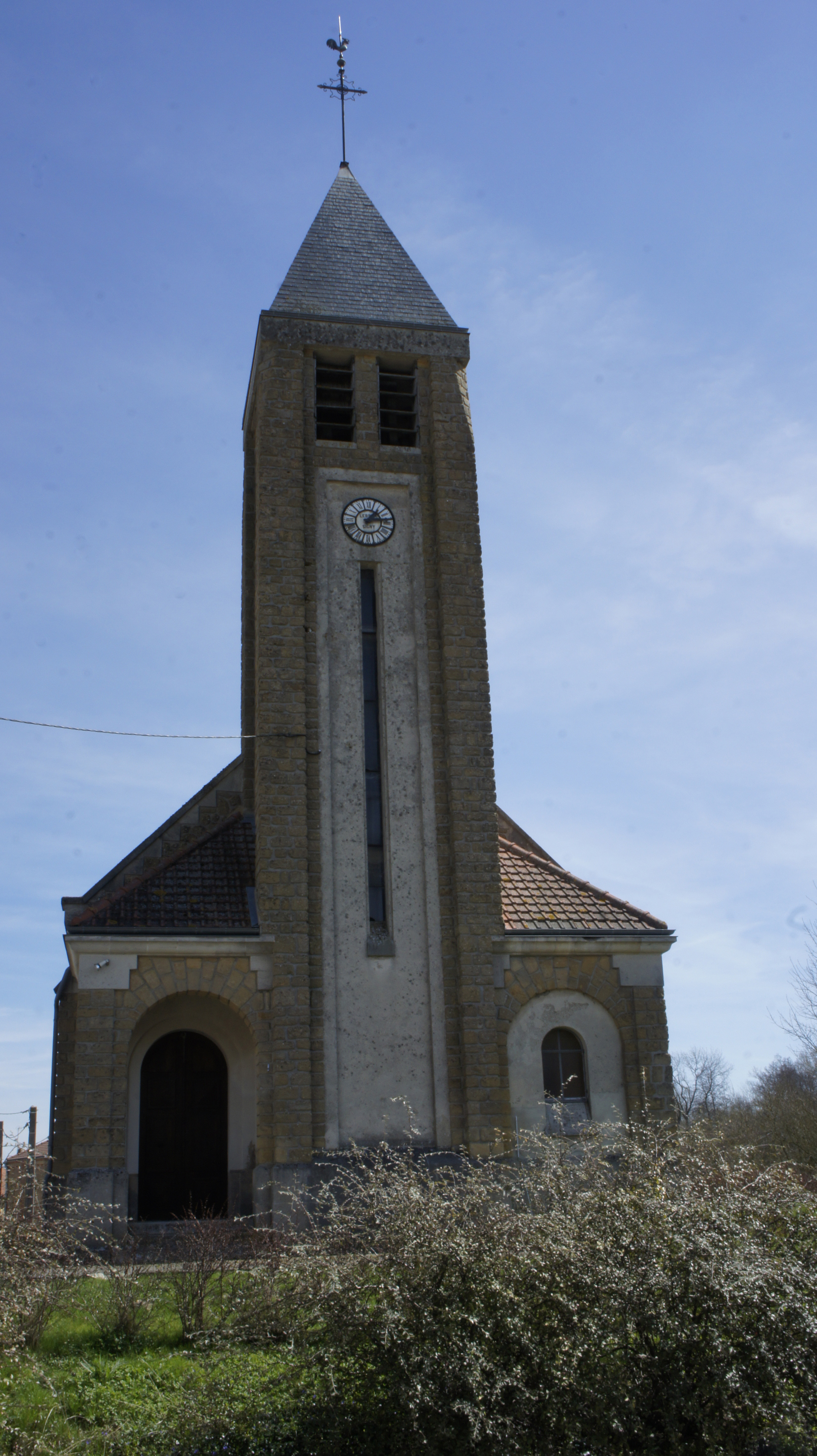
- The church in Bignicourt
- Location of Bignicourt
- Location within France Location within Grand Est
- Coordinates: 49°24′00″N 4°25′01″E
- Country: France
- Region: Grand Est
- Department: Ardennes
- Arrondissement: Rethel
- Canton: Château-Porcien
- Intercommunality: Pays Rethélois

Government
  - Mayor (2020–2026): Philippe Charbeaux
- Area^{1}: 8.62 km^{2} (3.33 sq mi)
- Elevation: 109 m (358 ft)
- Highest elevation: 147 m (482 ft)
- Lowest elevation: 93 m (305 ft)
- Population (2023): 65
  - Density: 7.5/km^{2} (20/sq mi)
- Time zone: UTC+01:00 (CET)
  - Summer (DST): UTC+02:00 (CEST)
- INSEE/Postal code: 08066 /08310
- ^{1} French Land Register data, which excludes lakes, ponds, glaciers > 1 km^{2} (0.386 sq mi or 247 acres) and river estuaries.

Bignicourt (French pronunciation: [biɲikuʁ]) is a commune in the Ardennes department in northern France.

== See also ==
- Communes of the Ardennes department
