= Saint-Remy-le-Petit =

- Commune
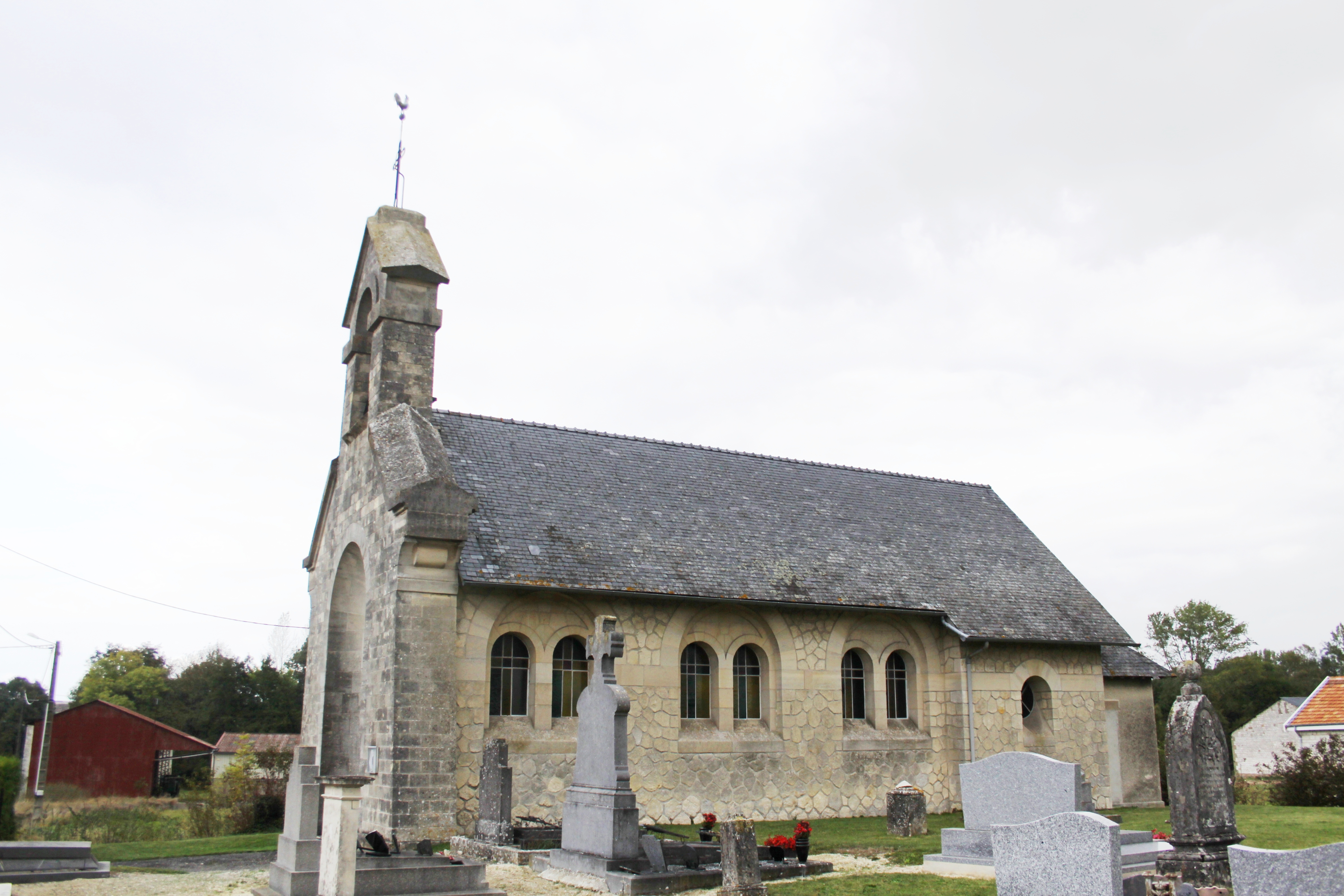
- The church in Saint-Remy-le-Petit
- Location of Saint-Remy-le-Petit
- Location within France Location within Grand Est
- Coordinates: 49°24′55″N 4°14′26″E
- Country: France
- Region: Grand Est
- Department: Ardennes
- Arrondissement: Rethel
- Canton: Château-Porcien

Government
  - Mayor (2020–2026): Gregory Graumer
- Area^{1}: 7.5 km^{2} (2.9 sq mi)
- Elevation: 70 m (230 ft)
- Highest elevation: 126 m (413 ft)
- Lowest elevation: 72 m (236 ft)
- Population (2023): 56
  - Density: 7.5/km^{2} (19/sq mi)
- Time zone: UTC+01:00 (CET)
  - Summer (DST): UTC+02:00 (CEST)
- INSEE/Postal code: 08397 /08300
- ^{1} French Land Register data, which excludes lakes, ponds, glaciers > 1 km^{2} (0.386 sq mi or 247 acres) and river estuaries.

Saint-Remy-le-Petit is a commune in the Ardennes department in northern France.

== Population ==
Historical population
Year	Pop.	±% p.a.
1968	62	—
1975	54	−1.95%
1982	38	−4.90%
1990	32	−2.13%
1999	36	+1.32%
2007	33	−1.08%
2012	60	+12.70%
2017	42	−6.89%
2023	56	+4.91%
Source: INSEE

== See also ==
- Communes of the Ardennes department
