= Roizy =

- Commune
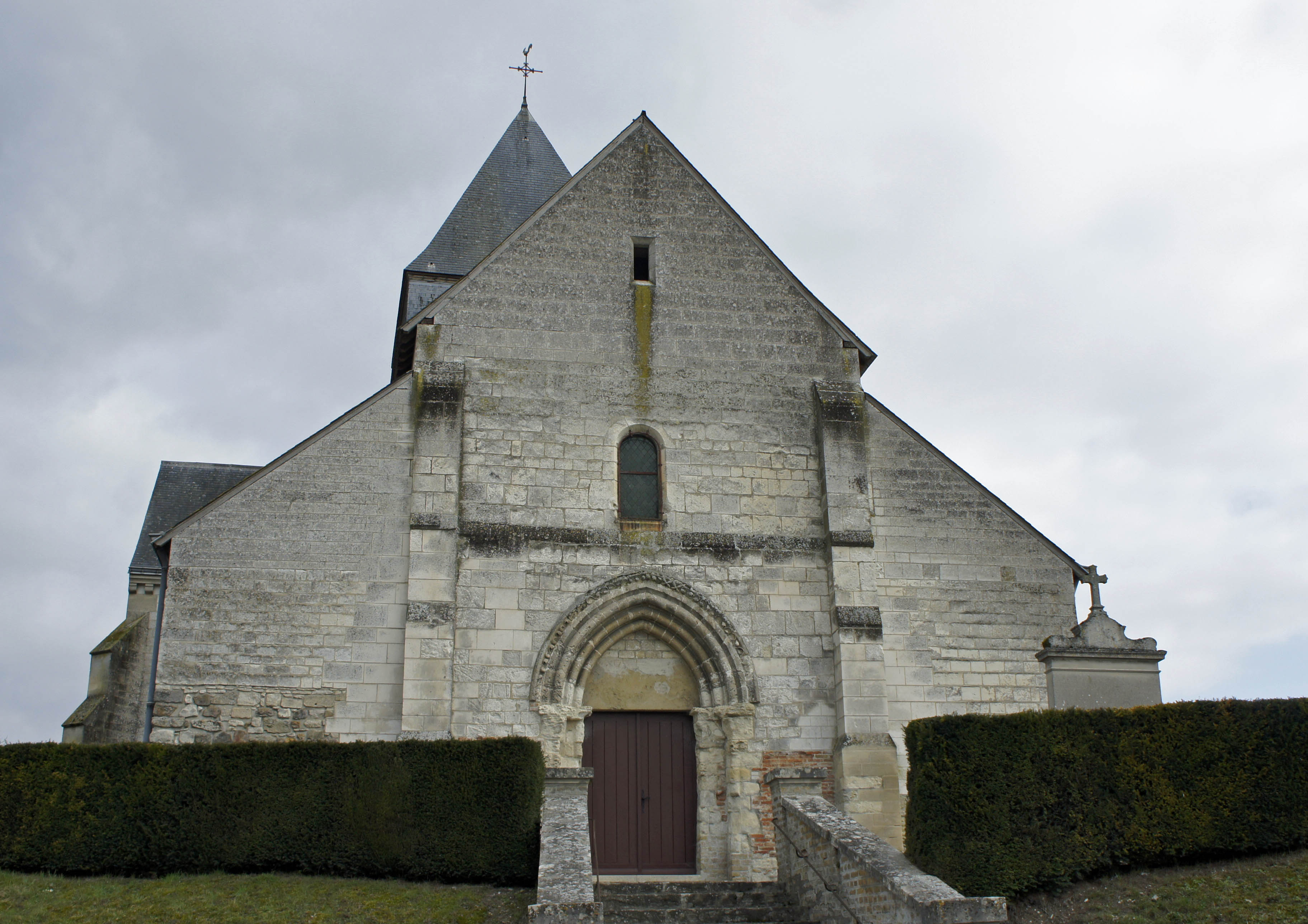
- The church in Roizy
- Location of Roizy
- Location within France Location within Grand Est
- Coordinates: 49°25′33″N 4°10′41″E
- Country: France
- Region: Grand Est
- Department: Ardennes
- Arrondissement: Rethel
- Canton: Château-Porcien

Government
  - Mayor (2020–2026): Xavier Guillaume
- Area^{1}: 11.15 km^{2} (4.31 sq mi)
- Elevation: 70 m (230 ft)
- Population (2023): 226
  - Density: 20.3/km^{2} (52.5/sq mi)
- Time zone: UTC+01:00 (CET)
  - Summer (DST): UTC+02:00 (CEST)
- INSEE/Postal code: 08368 /08190
- ^{1} French Land Register data, which excludes lakes, ponds, glaciers > 1 km^{2} (0.386 sq mi or 247 acres) and river estuaries.

Roizy (French pronunciation: [ʁwazi]) is a commune in the Ardennes department in northern France.

== Population ==
Historical population
Year	Pop.	±% p.a.
1968	260	—
1975	212	−2.87%
1982	197	−1.04%
1990	205	+0.50%
1999	223	+0.94%
2007	242	+1.03%
2012	240	−0.17%
2017	219	−1.81%
2023	226	+0.53%
Source: INSEE

== See also ==
- Communes of the Ardennes department
