= Poilcourt-Sydney =

- Commune
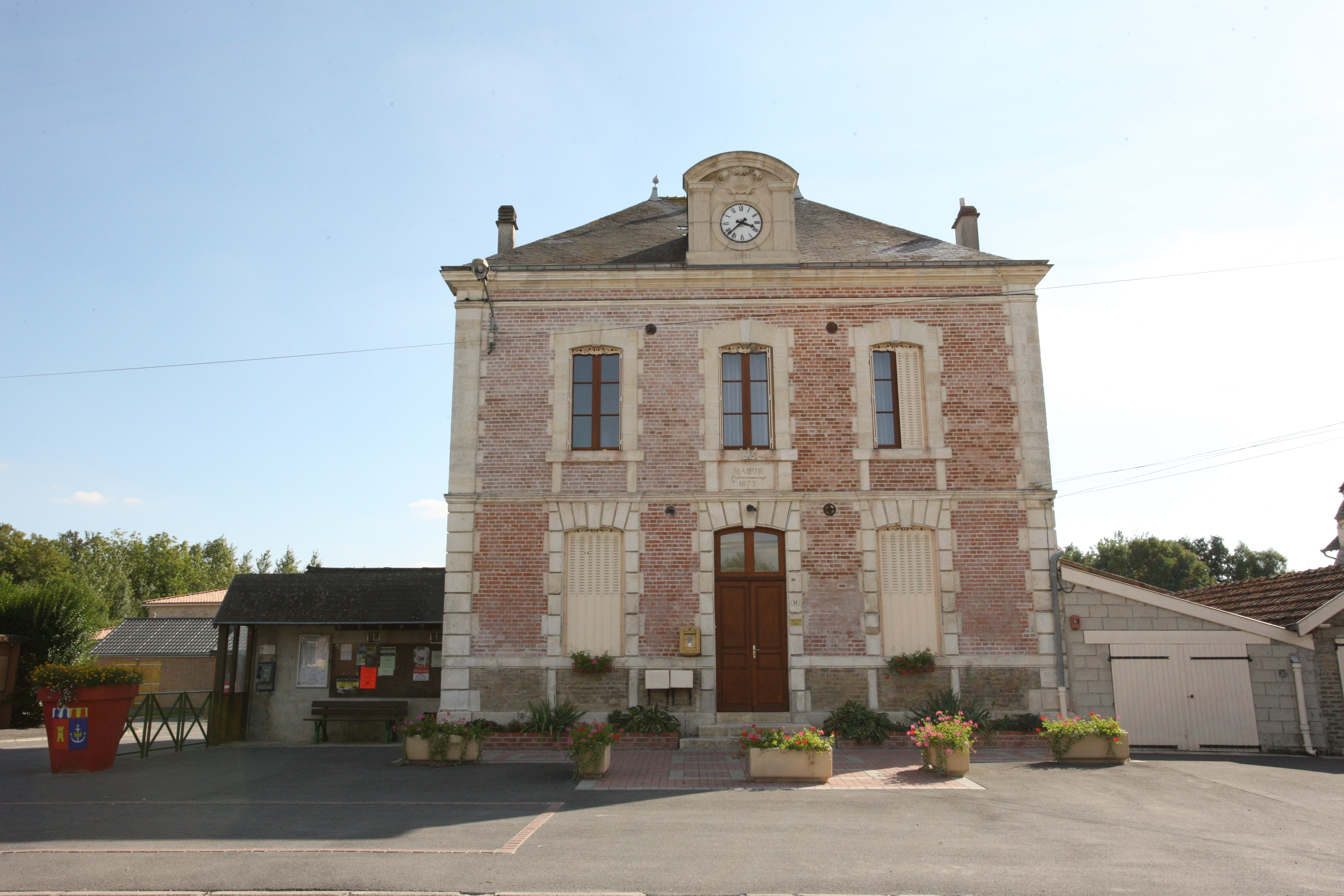
- Town hall

- Coat of arms
- Location of Poilcourt-Sydney
- Location within France Location within Grand Est
- Coordinates: 49°25′24″N 4°06′09″E
- Country: France
- Region: Grand Est
- Department: Ardennes
- Arrondissement: Rethel
- Canton: Château-Porcien

Government
  - Mayor (2020–2026): Christian Lagarde
- Area^{1}: 7.88 km^{2} (3.04 sq mi)
- Elevation: 63 m (207 ft)
- Population (2023): 176
  - Density: 22.3/km^{2} (57.8/sq mi)
- Time zone: UTC+01:00 (CET)
  - Summer (DST): UTC+02:00 (CEST)
- INSEE/Postal code: 08340 /08190
- ^{1} French Land Register data, which excludes lakes, ponds, glaciers > 1 km^{2} (0.386 sq mi or 247 acres) and river estuaries.

Poilcourt-Sydney (French pronunciation: [pwalkuʁ sidnɛ]) is a commune in the Ardennes department in northern France. It is named after the City of Sydney in Australia.

== Population ==
Historical population
Year	Pop.	±% p.a.
1968	174	—
1975	165	−0.76%
1982	155	−0.89%
1990	150	−0.41%
1999	150	+0.00%
2007	163	+1.04%
2012	186	+2.68%
2017	181	−0.54%
2023	176	−0.47%
Source: INSEE

== See also ==
- Communes of the Ardennes department
