= Sault-Saint-Remy =

- Commune
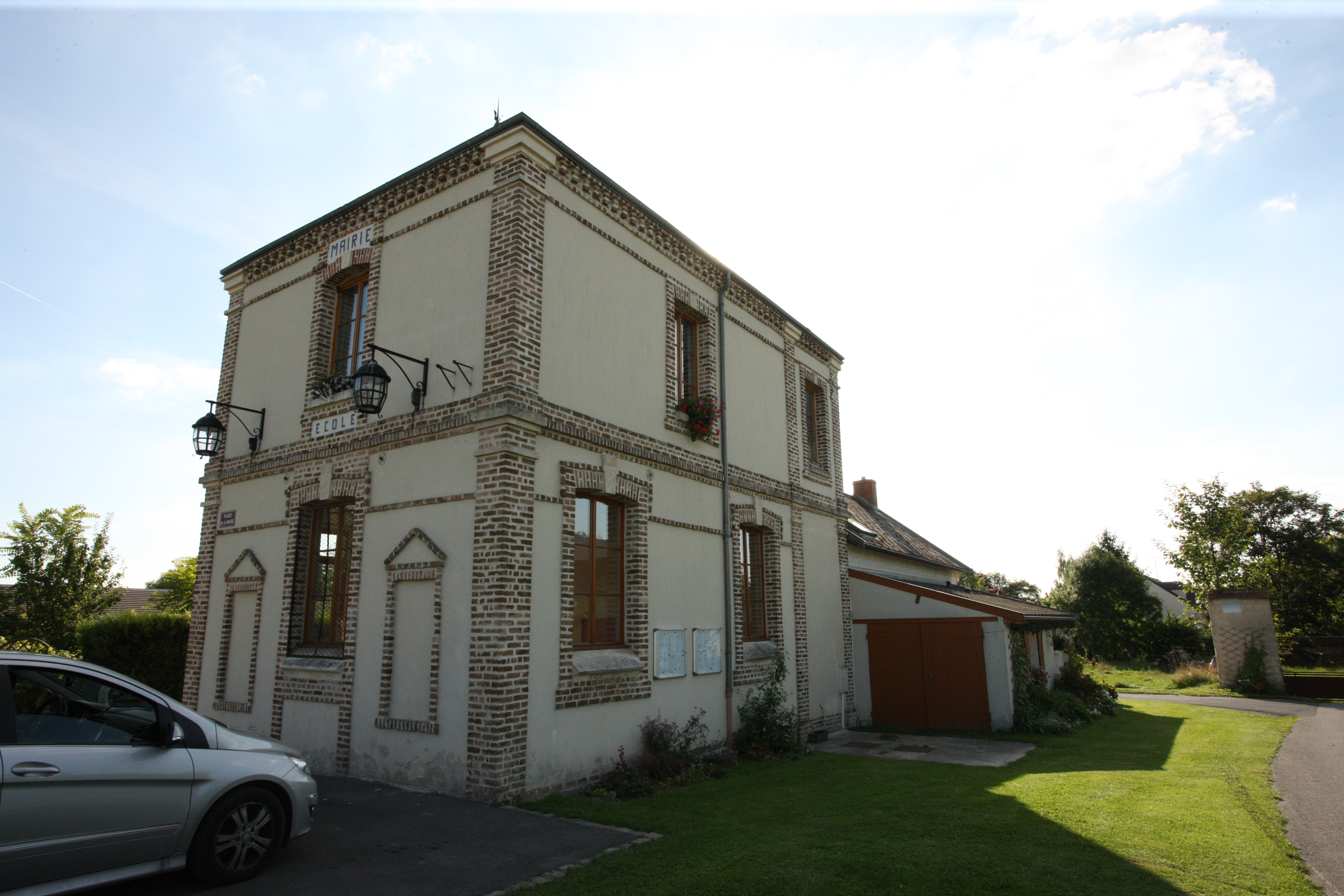
- Town hall
- Location of Sault-Saint-Remy
- Location within France Location within Grand Est
- Coordinates: 49°25′38″N 4°09′45″E
- Country: France
- Region: Grand Est
- Department: Ardennes
- Arrondissement: Rethel
- Canton: Château-Porcien

Government
  - Mayor (2020–2026): Fabien Gatinois
- Area^{1}: 9.63 km^{2} (3.72 sq mi)
- Elevation: 73 m (240 ft)
- Population (2023): 207
  - Density: 21.5/km^{2} (55.7/sq mi)
- Time zone: UTC+01:00 (CET)
  - Summer (DST): UTC+02:00 (CEST)
- INSEE/Postal code: 08404 /08190
- ^{1} French Land Register data, which excludes lakes, ponds, glaciers > 1 km^{2} (0.386 sq mi or 247 acres) and river estuaries.

Sault-Saint-Remy is a commune in the Ardennes department in northern France.

== Population ==
Historical population
Year	Pop.	±% p.a.
1968	101	—
1975	92	−1.32%
1982	114	+3.11%
1990	176	+5.58%
1999	161	−0.98%
2007	159	−0.16%
2012	178	+2.28%
2017	204	+2.76%
2023	207	+0.24%
Source: INSEE

== See also ==
- Communes of the Ardennes department
