= Seraincourt, Ardennes =

Seraincourt
- Commune
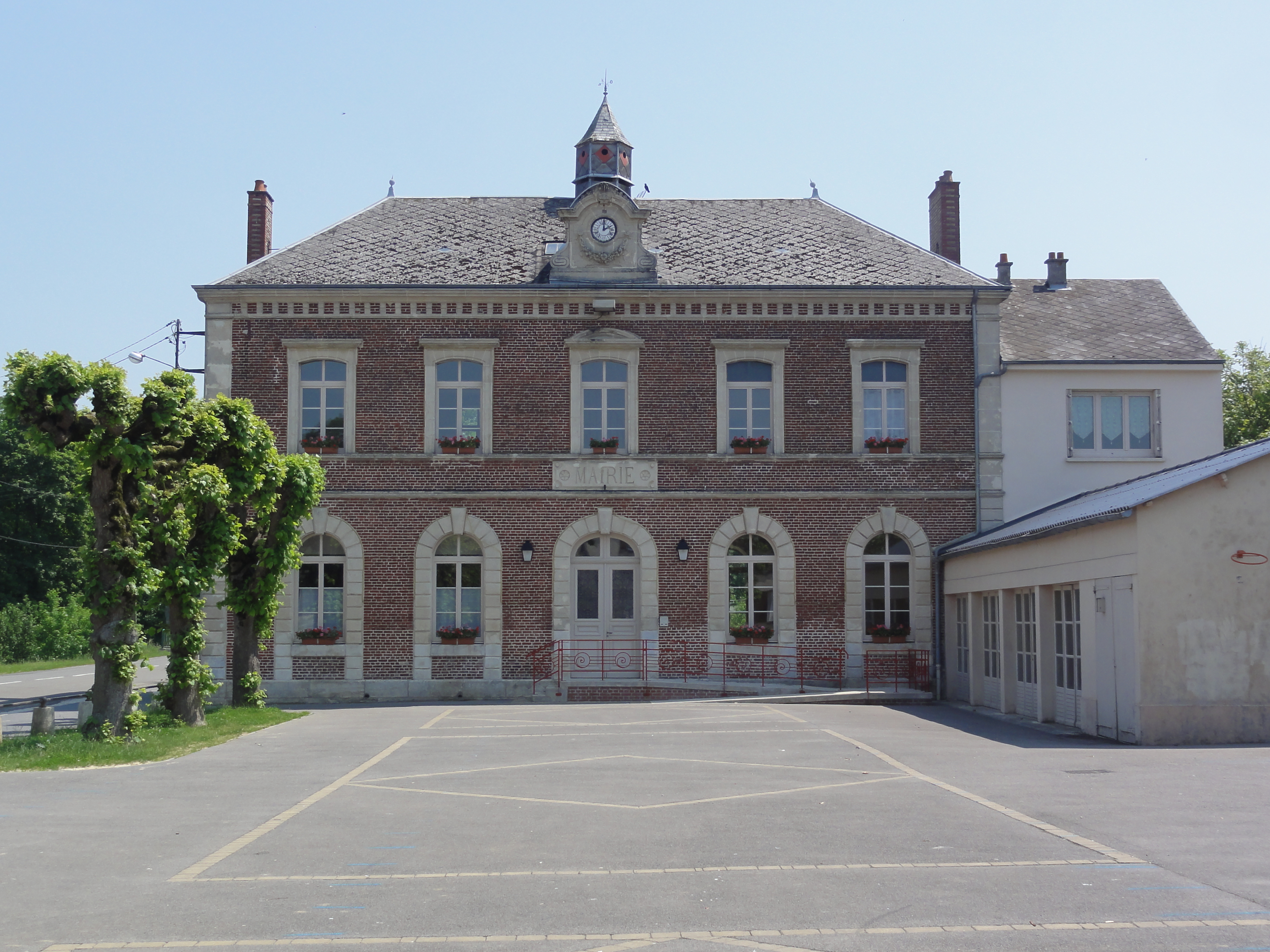
- The town hall in Seraincourt
- Location of Seraincourt
- Location within France Location within Grand Est
- Coordinates: 49°36′41″N 4°12′08″E
- Country: France
- Region: Grand Est
- Department: Ardennes
- Arrondissement: Rethel
- Canton: Château-Porcien

Government
  - Mayor (2020–2026): Mathieu Fourny
- Area^{1}: 16.2 km^{2} (6.3 sq mi)
- Elevation: 110 m (360 ft)
- Population (2023): 254
  - Density: 15.7/km^{2} (40.6/sq mi)
- Time zone: UTC+01:00 (CET)
  - Summer (DST): UTC+02:00 (CEST)
- INSEE/Postal code: 08413 /08220
- ^{1} French Land Register data, which excludes lakes, ponds, glaciers > 1 km^{2} (0.386 sq mi or 247 acres) and river estuaries.

Seraincourt (French pronunciation: [səʁɛ̃kuʁ]) is a commune in the Ardennes department in northern France.

== Population ==
Historical population
Year	Pop.	±% p.a.
1968	311	—
1975	274	−1.79%
1982	248	−1.41%
1990	232	−0.83%
1999	216	−0.79%
2007	241	+1.38%
2012	250	+0.74%
2017	279	+2.22%
2023	254	−1.55%
Source: INSEE

== See also ==
- Communes of the Ardennes department
