= Taizy =

- Commune
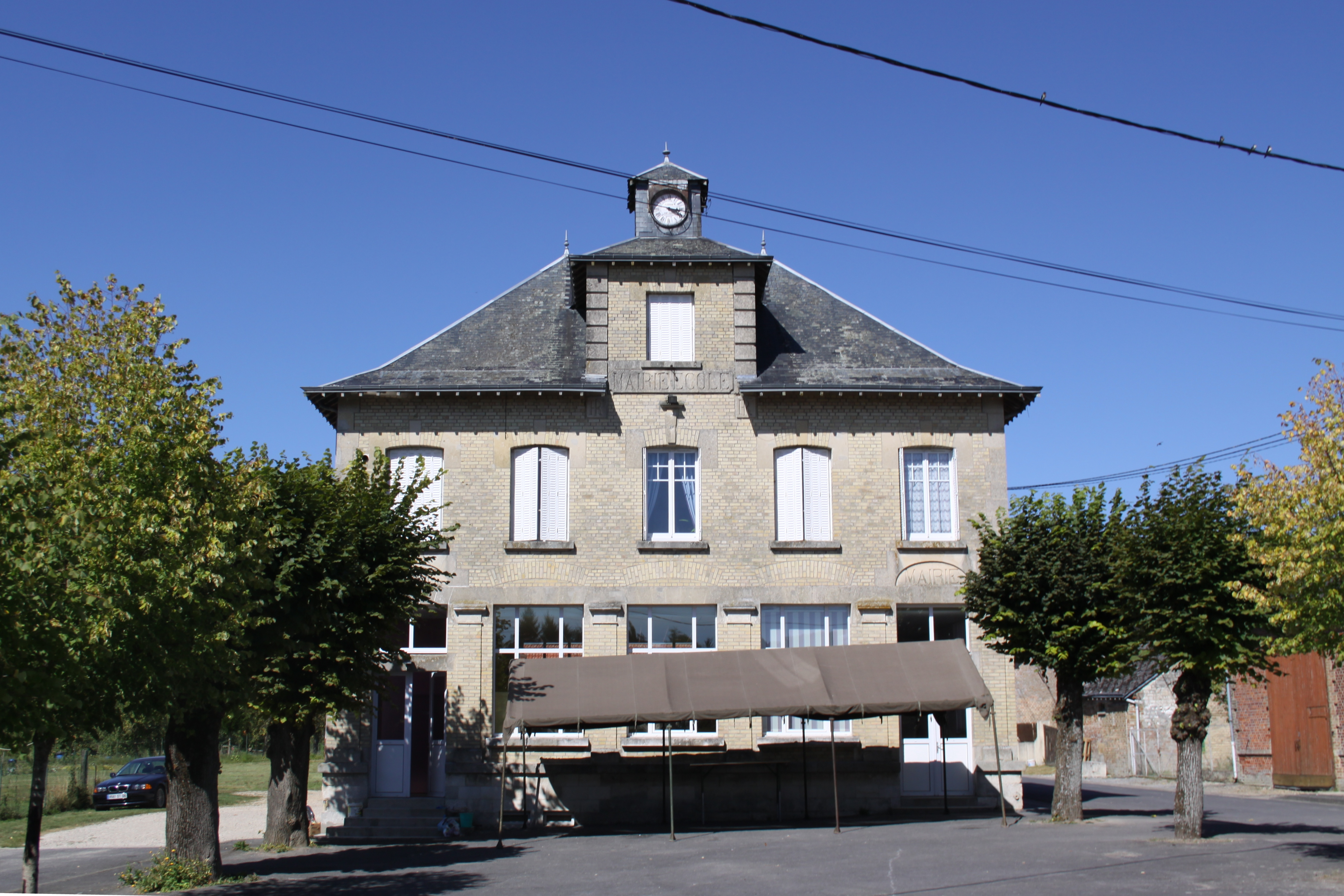
- The town hall in Taizy
- Location of Taizy
- Location within France Location within Grand Est
- Coordinates: 49°31′19″N 4°15′37″E
- Country: France
- Region: Grand Est
- Department: Ardennes
- Arrondissement: Rethel
- Canton: Château-Porcien

Government
  - Mayor (2020–2026): Sylvain Potier
- Area^{1}: 9.11 km^{2} (3.52 sq mi)
- Highest elevation: 136 m (446 ft)
- Lowest elevation: 66 m (217 ft)
- Population (2023): 99
  - Density: 11/km^{2} (28/sq mi)
- Time zone: UTC+01:00 (CET)
  - Summer (DST): UTC+02:00 (CEST)
- INSEE/Postal code: 08438 /08360
- ^{1} French Land Register data, which excludes lakes, ponds, glaciers > 1 km^{2} (0.386 sq mi or 247 acres) and river estuaries.

Taizy (French pronunciation: [tɛzi]) is a commune in the Ardennes department in northern France.

== Population ==
Historical population
Year	Pop.	±% p.a.
1968	125	—
1975	102	−2.86%
1982	105	+0.41%
1990	112	+0.81%
1999	109	−0.30%
2007	108	−0.12%
2012	112	+0.73%
2017	105	−1.28%
2023	99	−0.98%
Source: INSEE

== See also ==
- Communes of the Ardennes department
