= Brienne-sur-Aisne =

- Commune
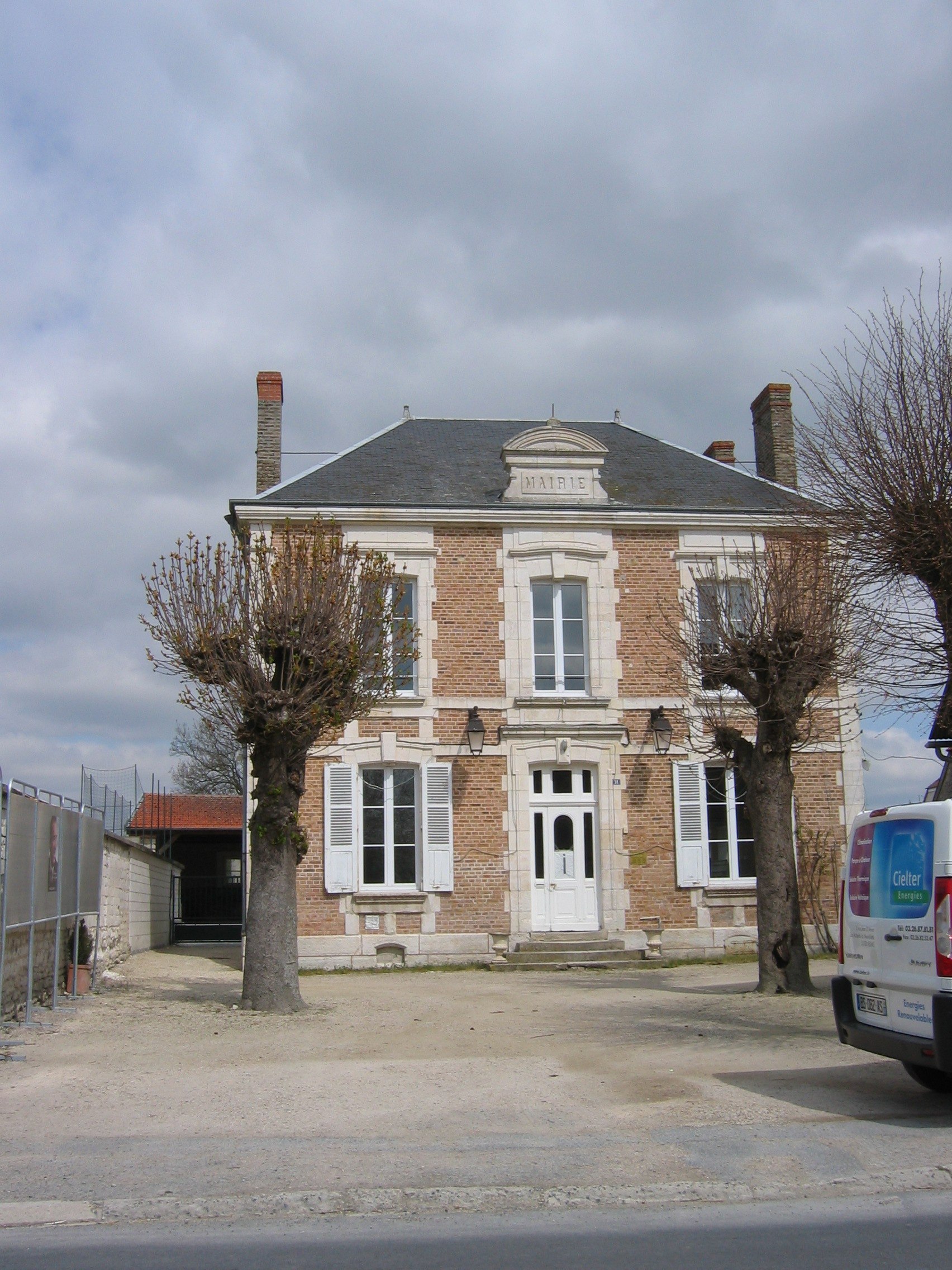
- Town hall
- Location of Brienne-sur-Aisne
- Location within France Location within Grand Est
- Coordinates: 49°26′02″N 4°03′12″E
- Country: France
- Region: Grand Est
- Department: Ardennes
- Arrondissement: Rethel
- Canton: Château-Porcien

Government
  - Mayor (2020–2026): Xavier de Bouteville
- Area^{1}: 12.23 km^{2} (4.72 sq mi)
- Population (2023): 277
  - Density: 22.6/km^{2} (58.7/sq mi)
- Time zone: UTC+01:00 (CET)
  - Summer (DST): UTC+02:00 (CEST)
- INSEE/Postal code: 08084 /08190
- ^{1} French Land Register data, which excludes lakes, ponds, glaciers > 1 km^{2} (0.386 sq mi or 247 acres) and river estuaries.

Brienne-sur-Aisne (French pronunciation: [bʁijɛn syʁ ɛn], literally Brienne on Aisne) is a commune in the Ardennes department in northern France.

== Sister cities ==
It is the sister town of Michiana Shores, Indiana.

== See also ==
- Communes of the Ardennes department
