= Saint-Germainmont =

- Commune
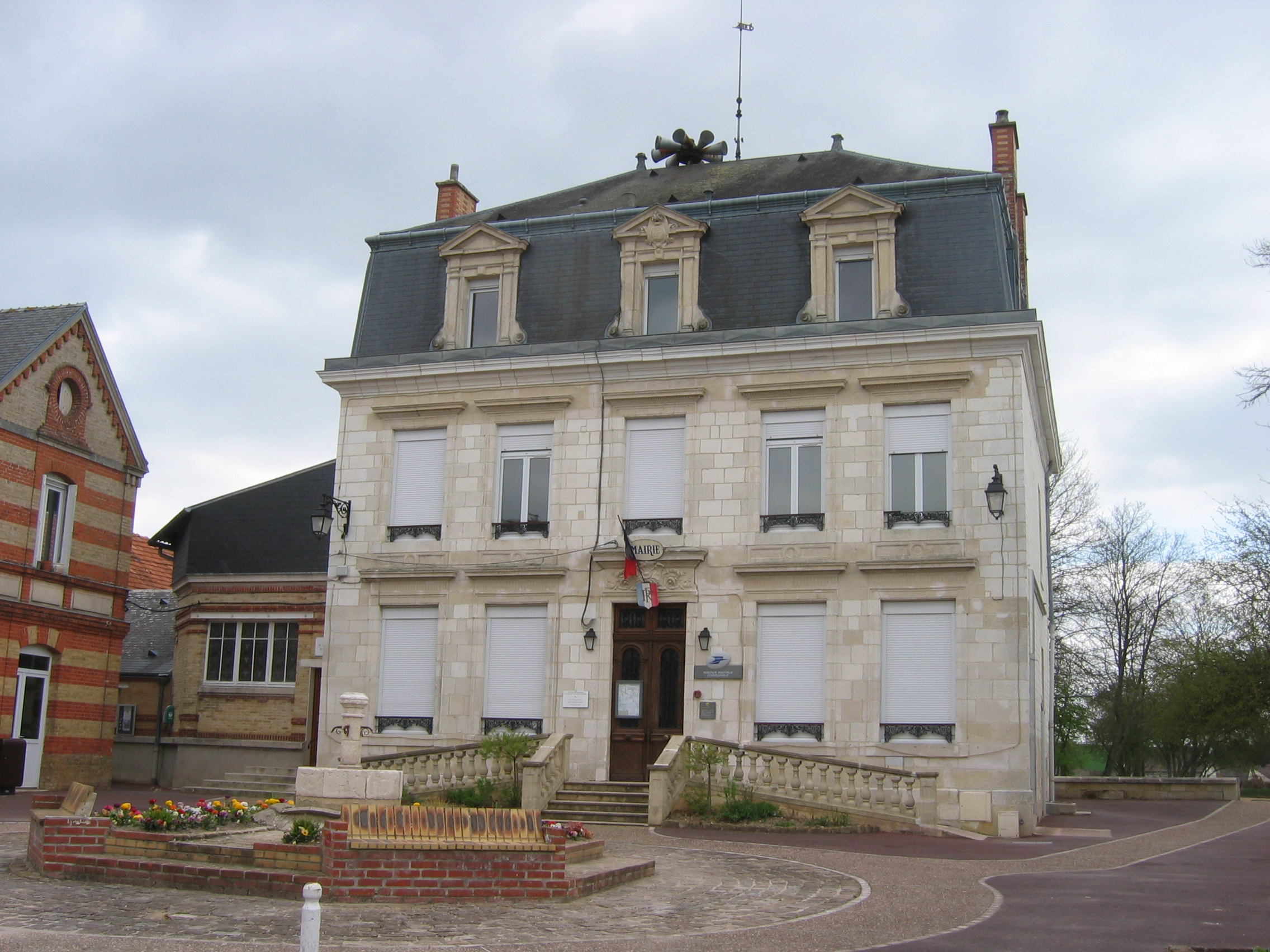
- Town hall

- Coat of arms
- Location of Saint-Germainmont
- Location within France Location within Grand Est
- Coordinates: 49°30′30″N 4°07′56″E
- Country: France
- Region: Grand Est
- Department: Ardennes
- Arrondissement: Rethel
- Canton: Château-Porcien

Government
  - Mayor (2020–2026): Blandine Chocardelle
- Area^{1}: 15.69 km^{2} (6.06 sq mi)
- Elevation: 70 m (230 ft)
- Population (2023): 806
  - Density: 51.4/km^{2} (133/sq mi)
- Time zone: UTC+01:00 (CET)
  - Summer (DST): UTC+02:00 (CEST)
- INSEE/Postal code: 08381 /08190
- ^{1} French Land Register data, which excludes lakes, ponds, glaciers > 1 km^{2} (0.386 sq mi or 247 acres) and river estuaries.

Saint-Germainmont (French pronunciation: [sɛ̃ ʒɛʁmɛ̃mɔ̃]) is a commune in the Ardennes department in northern France.

== Population ==
Historical population
Year	Pop.	±% p.a.
1968	804	—
1975	820	+0.28%
1982	824	+0.07%
1990	868	+0.65%
1999	775	−1.25%
2007	798	+0.37%
2012	802	+0.10%
2017	842	+0.98%
2023	806	−0.73%
Source: INSEE

== See also ==
- Communes of the Ardennes department
