= L'Écaille =

- Commune
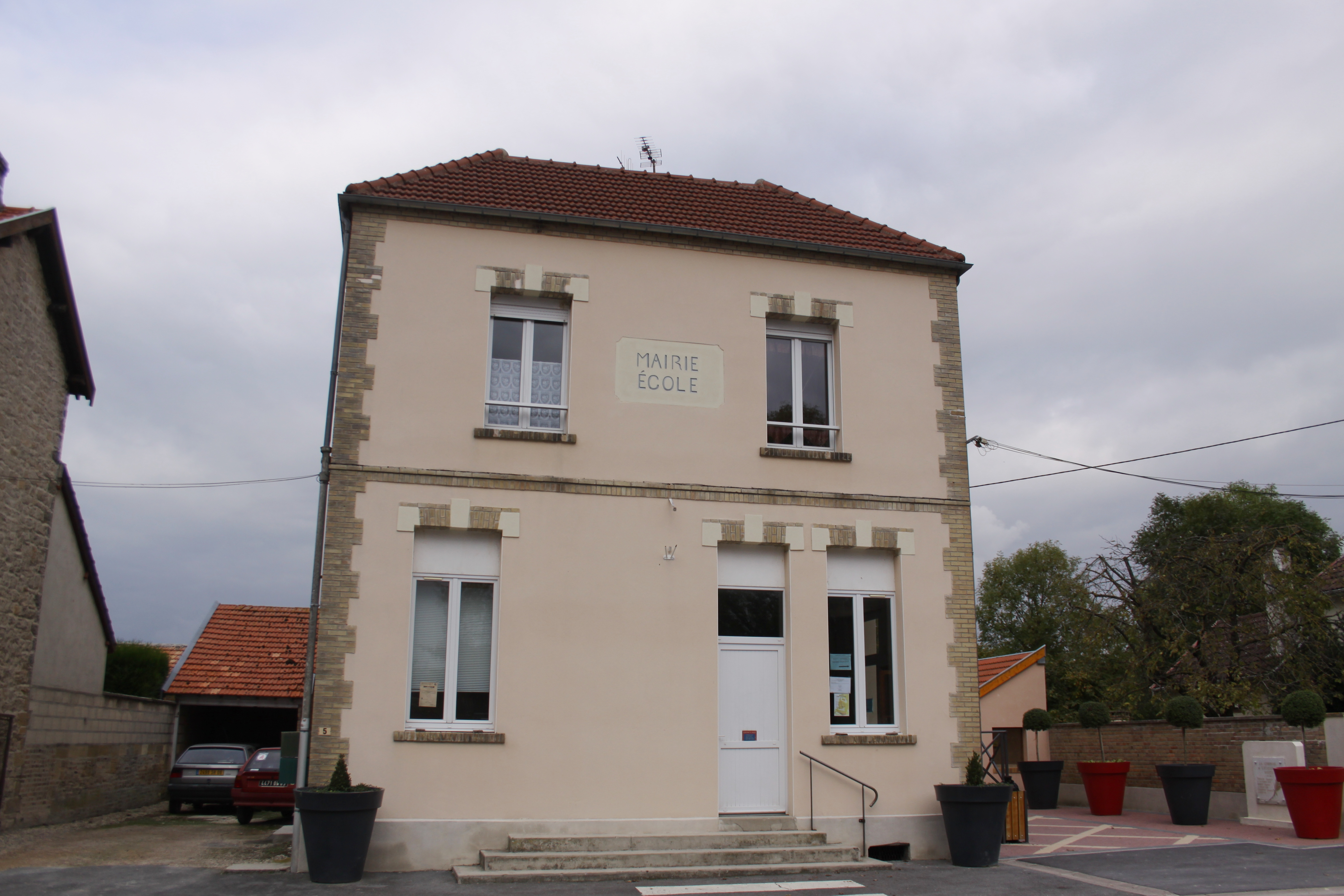
- Town hall and school
- Location of L'Écaille
- Location within France Location within Grand Est
- Coordinates: 49°25′04″N 4°12′45″E
- Country: France
- Region: Grand Est
- Department: Ardennes
- Arrondissement: Rethel
- Canton: Château-Porcien
- Intercommunality: Pays Rethélois

Government
  - Mayor (2020–2026): Joachim Gaillot
- Area^{1}: 9.15 km^{2} (3.53 sq mi)
- Elevation: 78 m (256 ft)
- Population (2023): 263
  - Density: 28.7/km^{2} (74.4/sq mi)
- Time zone: UTC+01:00 (CET)
  - Summer (DST): UTC+02:00 (CEST)
- INSEE/Postal code: 08148 /08300
- ^{1} French Land Register data, which excludes lakes, ponds, glaciers > 1 km^{2} (0.386 sq mi or 247 acres) and river estuaries.

L'Écaille (French pronunciation: [lekaj]) is a commune in the Ardennes department in the Grand Est region in northern France.

== Population ==
Historical population
Year	Pop.	±% p.a.
1968	119	—
1975	113	−0.74%
1982	115	+0.25%
1990	118	+0.32%
1999	131	+1.17%
2007	173	+3.54%
2012	205	+3.45%
2017	275	+6.05%
2023	263	−0.74%
Source: INSEE

== See also ==
- Communes of the Ardennes department
