= Saint-Loup-en-Champagne =

- Commune
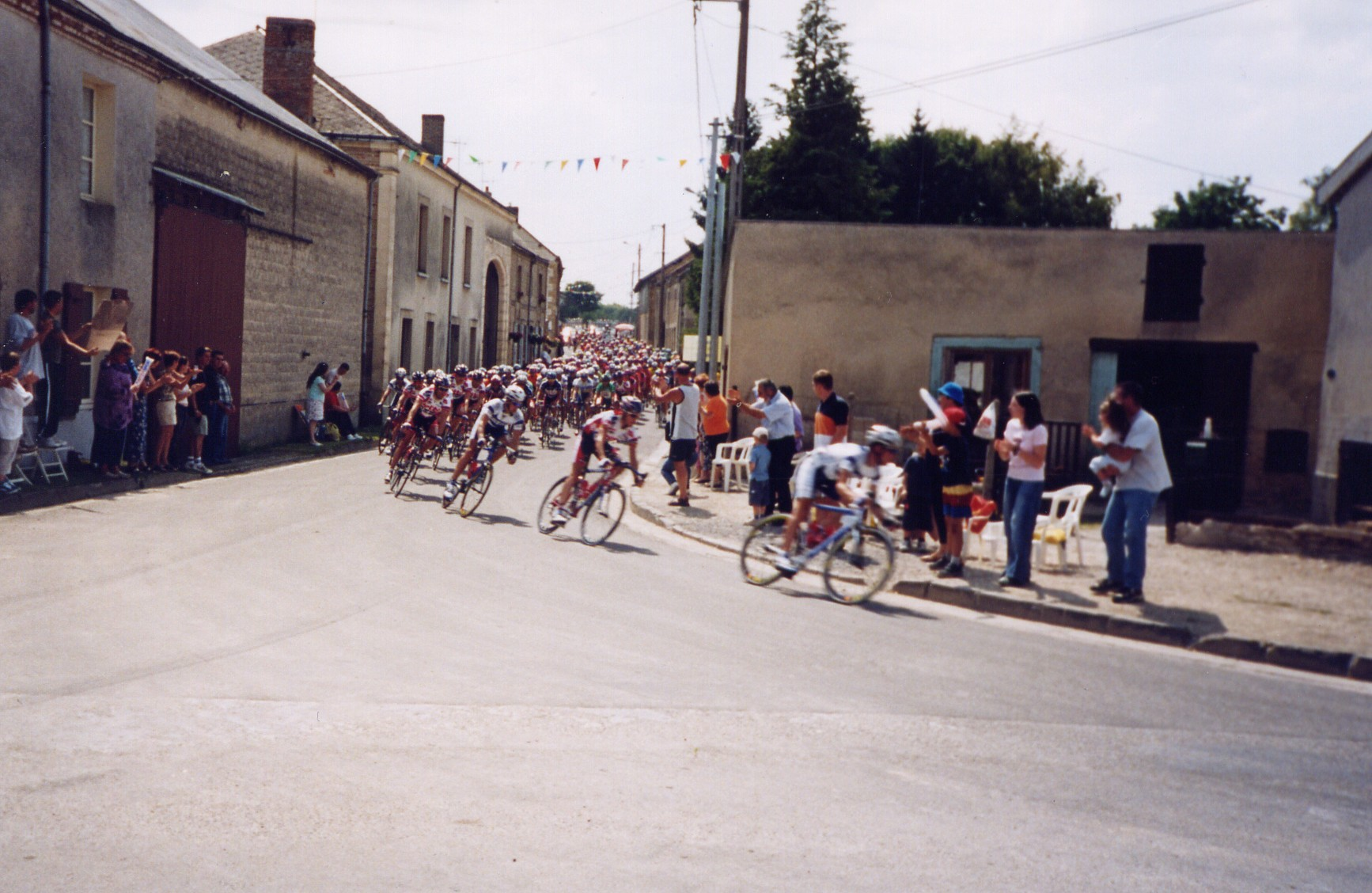
- The Tour de France peloton passing through Saint-Loup-en-Champagne in 2003
- Location of Saint-Loup-en-Champagne
- Location within France Location within Grand Est
- Coordinates: 49°27′20″N 4°13′16″E
- Country: France
- Region: Grand Est
- Department: Ardennes
- Arrondissement: Rethel
- Canton: Château-Porcien

Government
  - Mayor (2020–2026): Amandine Nocton
- Area^{1}: 15.77 km^{2} (6.09 sq mi)
- Elevation: 90 m (300 ft)
- Population (2023): 345
  - Density: 21.9/km^{2} (56.7/sq mi)
- Time zone: UTC+01:00 (CET)
  - Summer (DST): UTC+02:00 (CEST)
- INSEE/Postal code: 08386 /08300
- ^{1} French Land Register data, which excludes lakes, ponds, glaciers > 1 km^{2} (0.386 sq mi or 247 acres) and river estuaries.

Saint-Loup-en-Champagne (French pronunciation: [sɛ̃ lu ɑ̃ ʃɑ̃paɲ]; before 2002: Saint-Loup-Champagne) is a commune in the Ardennes department in northern France.

== Population ==
Historical population
Year	Pop.	±% p.a.
1968	232	—
1975	201	−2.03%
1982	220	+1.30%
1990	217	−0.17%
1999	223	+0.30%
2007	244	+1.13%
2012	241	−0.25%
2017	323	+6.03%
2023	345	+1.10%
Source: INSEE

== Church ==
The church tower was rebuilt above the portal, while the old Romanesque tower was in its normal place at the crossing of the transept. It forms a porch on the ground floor, before the nave rebuilt with it.

This church built during the eleventh century, enlarged and embellished four hundred years later, threatening to collapse. It has also been restored twice, through the combined efforts of the municipality and state. The transept and sanctuary were restored in 1879 to 1880. The nave and tower were rebuilt in 1887. The architecture of the tower, like the nave, is inspired by the flamboyant Gothic lines of the apse. The attic is covered with slate.

== See also ==
- Communes of the Ardennes department
