= Blanzy-la-Salonnaise =

- Commune
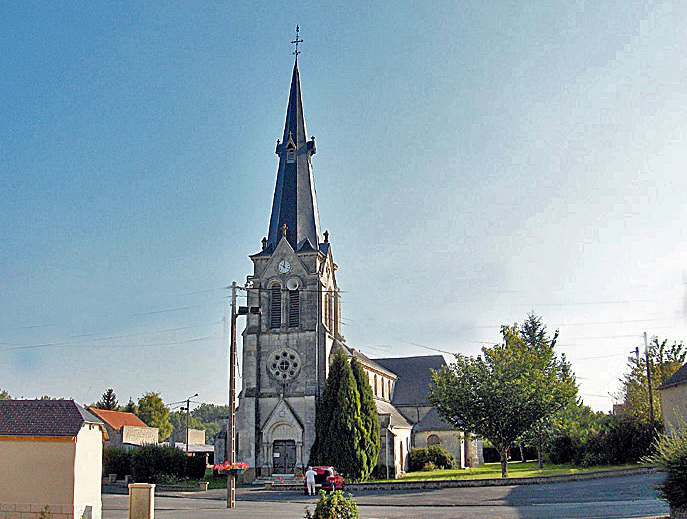
- The church in Blanzy-la-Salonnaise

- Coat of arms
- Location of Blanzy-la-Salonnaise
- Location within France Location within Grand Est
- Coordinates: 49°29′21″N 4°10′20″E
- Country: France
- Region: Grand Est
- Department: Ardennes
- Arrondissement: Rethel
- Canton: Château-Porcien

Government
  - Mayor (2020–2026): Marie-France Favreau
- Area^{1}: 12.13 km^{2} (4.68 sq mi)
- Highest elevation: 141 m (463 ft)
- Lowest elevation: 61 m (200 ft)
- Population (2023): 378
  - Density: 31.2/km^{2} (80.7/sq mi)
- Time zone: UTC+01:00 (CET)
  - Summer (DST): UTC+02:00 (CEST)
- INSEE/Postal code: 08070 /08190
- ^{1} French Land Register data, which excludes lakes, ponds, glaciers > 1 km^{2} (0.386 sq mi or 247 acres) and river estuaries.

Blanzy-la-Salonnaise (French pronunciation: [blɑ̃zi la salɔnɛz]) is a commune in the Ardennes department in northern France.

== Population ==
Historical population
Year	Pop.	±% p.a.
1968	316	—
1975	302	−0.65%
1982	291	−0.53%
1990	293	+0.09%
1999	282	−0.42%
2007	318	+1.51%
2012	340	+1.35%
2017	344	+0.23%
2023	378	+1.58%
Source: INSEE

== See also ==
- Communes of the Ardennes department
