= Ambly-Fleury =

- Commune
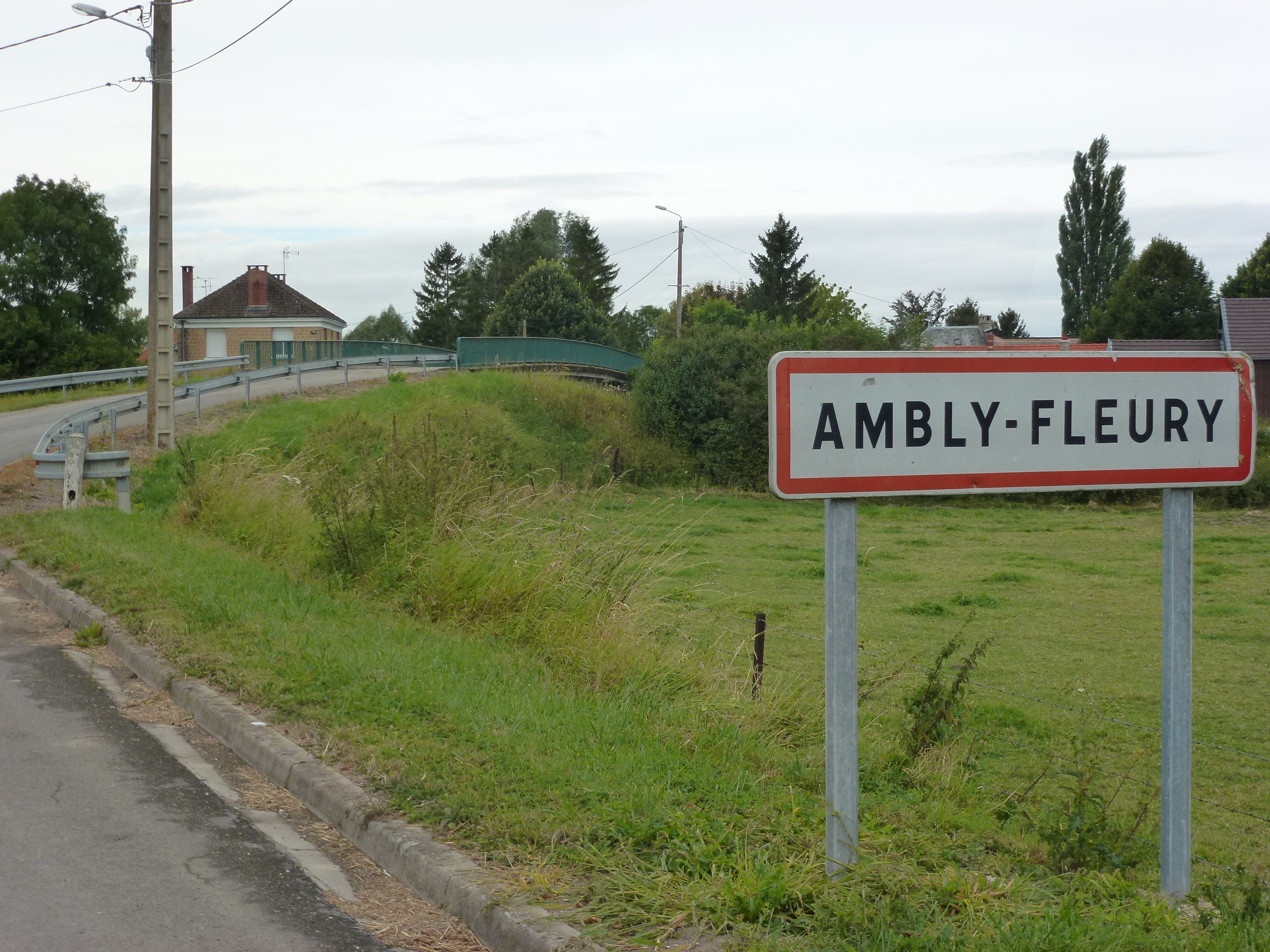
- Entry to the village and the bridge over the Ardennes canal
- Location of Ambly-Fleury
- Location within France Location within Grand Est
- Coordinates: 49°29′15″N 4°29′07″E
- Country: France
- Region: Grand Est
- Department: Ardennes
- Arrondissement: Rethel
- Canton: Rethel
- Intercommunality: Pays Rethélois

Government
  - Mayor (2020–2026): Jean Noël Leroy
- Area^{1}: 5.88 km^{2} (2.27 sq mi)
- Elevation: 78 m (256 ft)
- Population (2023): 132
  - Density: 22.4/km^{2} (58.1/sq mi)
- Time zone: UTC+01:00 (CET)
  - Summer (DST): UTC+02:00 (CEST)
- INSEE/Postal code: 08010 /08130
- ^{1} French Land Register data, which excludes lakes, ponds, glaciers > 1 km^{2} (0.386 sq mi or 247 acres) and river estuaries.

Ambly-Fleury (French pronunciation: [ɑ̃bli flœʁi]) is a commune in the Ardennes department in the Grand Est region of northern France.

== Geography ==
Ambly-Fleury is located some 10 km east by south-east of Rethel and some 23 km north-west of Vouziers. Access to the commune is by road D983 from Seuil in the west passing through the heart of the commune just south of the village and continuing east to Givry. The D45 minor road also comes from near Amagne in the north-west through the village then south to Mont-Laurent. Apart from the village there are also the hamlets of Ambly-Haut and Fleury on the D983 to the east of the village. The commune consists entirely of farmland.

The Canal des Ardennes passes through the heart of the commune parallel to the D983 in the west then continuing north-east out of the commune. The river Aisne also passes through the commune from the west passing to the north of the village then meandering through the commune and forming part of the northern border. The Ruisseau de Saulces Champenoises flows from the south through the commune to join the Aisne.

== Administration ==
List of Successive Mayors

| From | To | Name |
|---|---|---|
| 2001 | 2008 | Justin Dony |
| 2008 | 2014 | André Fleury |
| 2014 | 2020 | Jean-Luc Hery |
| 2020 | Current | Jean Noël Leroy |

== Population ==
Historical population
| Year | Pop. | ±% p.a. |
|---|---|---|
| 1968 | 195 | — |
| 1975 | 148 | −3.86% |
| 1982 | 124 | −2.50% |
| 1990 | 130 | +0.59% |
| 1999 | 151 | +1.68% |
| 2007 | 139 | −1.03% |
| 2012 | 129 | −1.48% |
| 2017 | 134 | +0.76% |
| 2023 | 132 | −0.25% |
Source: INSEE

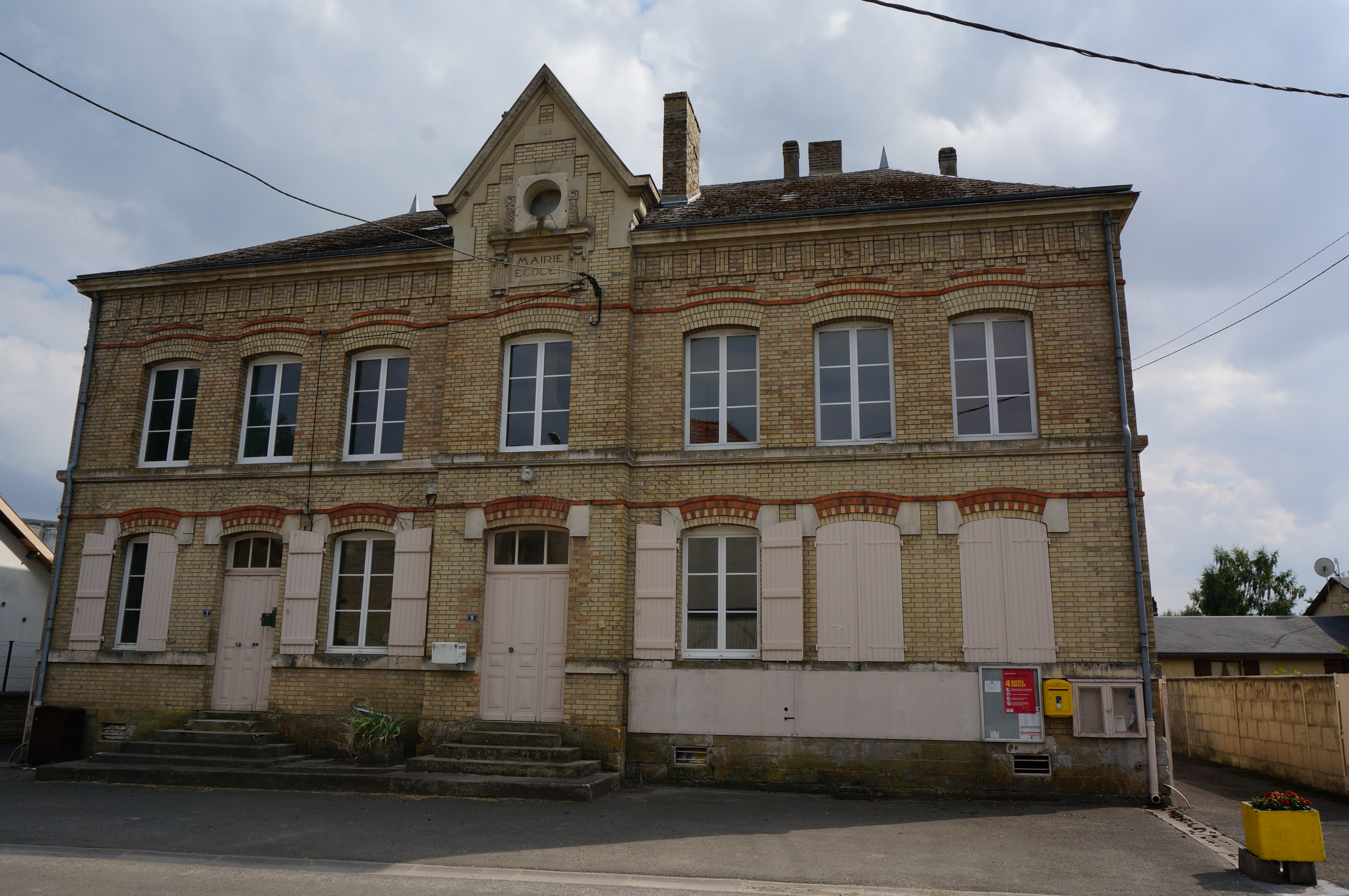
Ambly-Fleury Town Hall.

== Culture and heritage ==
=== Religious heritage ===
The Church of Saint-Pierre-aux-Liens contains a number of items which are registered as historical objects:

- A Statue: Saint Paul (18th century)
- A Statue: Saint Pierre (18th century)
- A Group Sculpture: The Nativity (17th century)
- A Bas-relief: The Crucifixion (16th century)

=== Picture Gallery ===
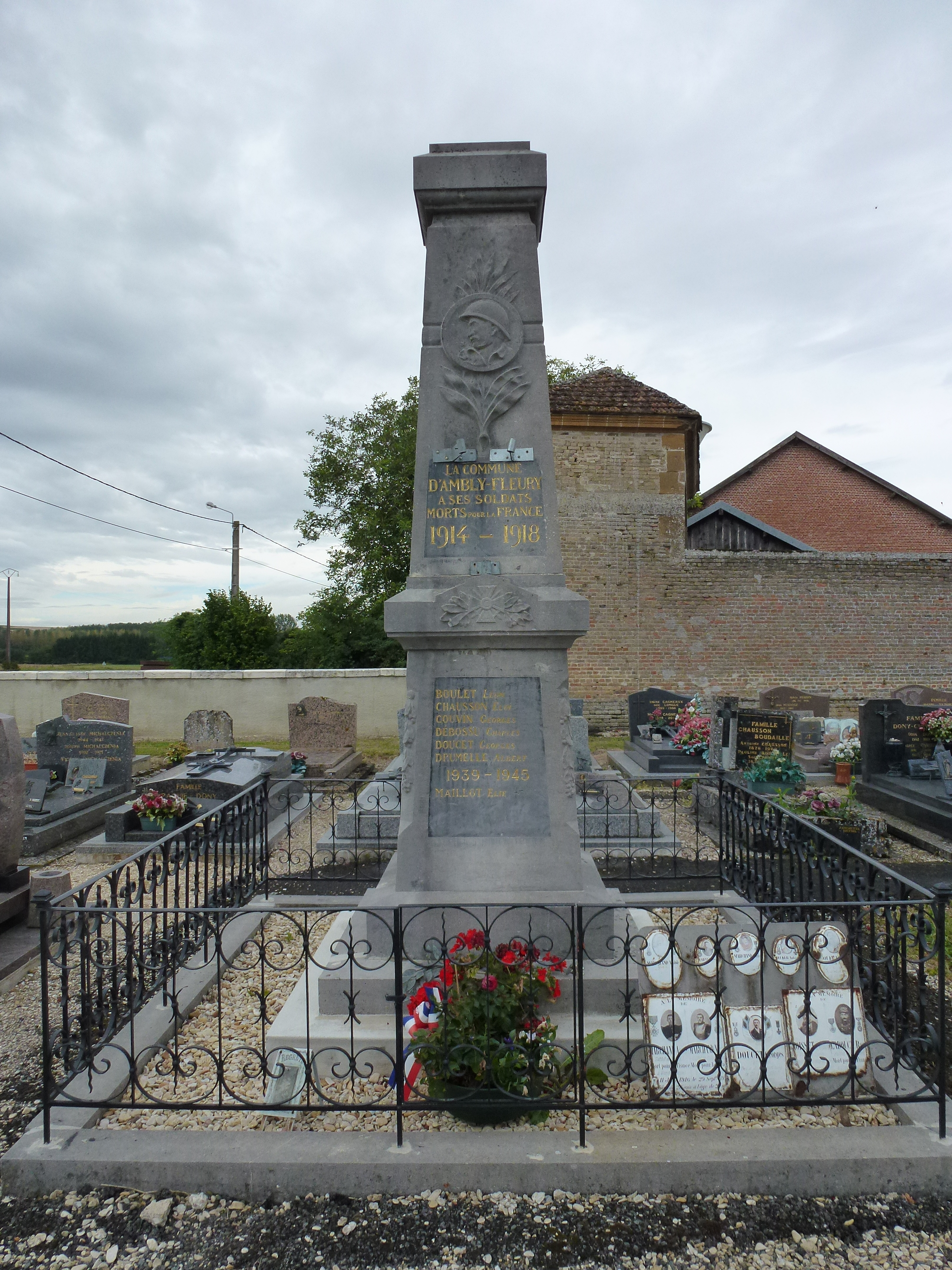
The War Memorial

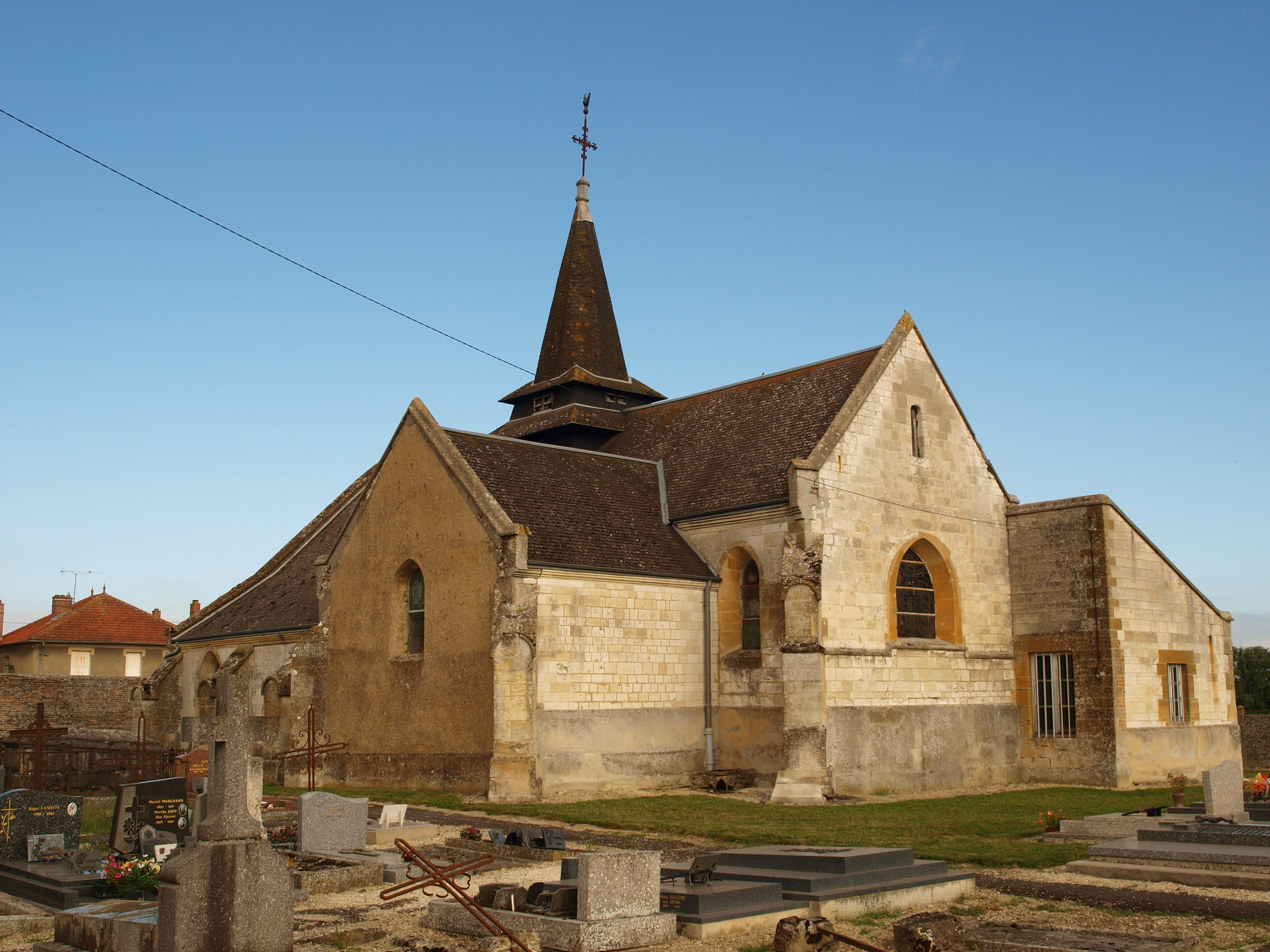
The church surrounded by the cemetery.

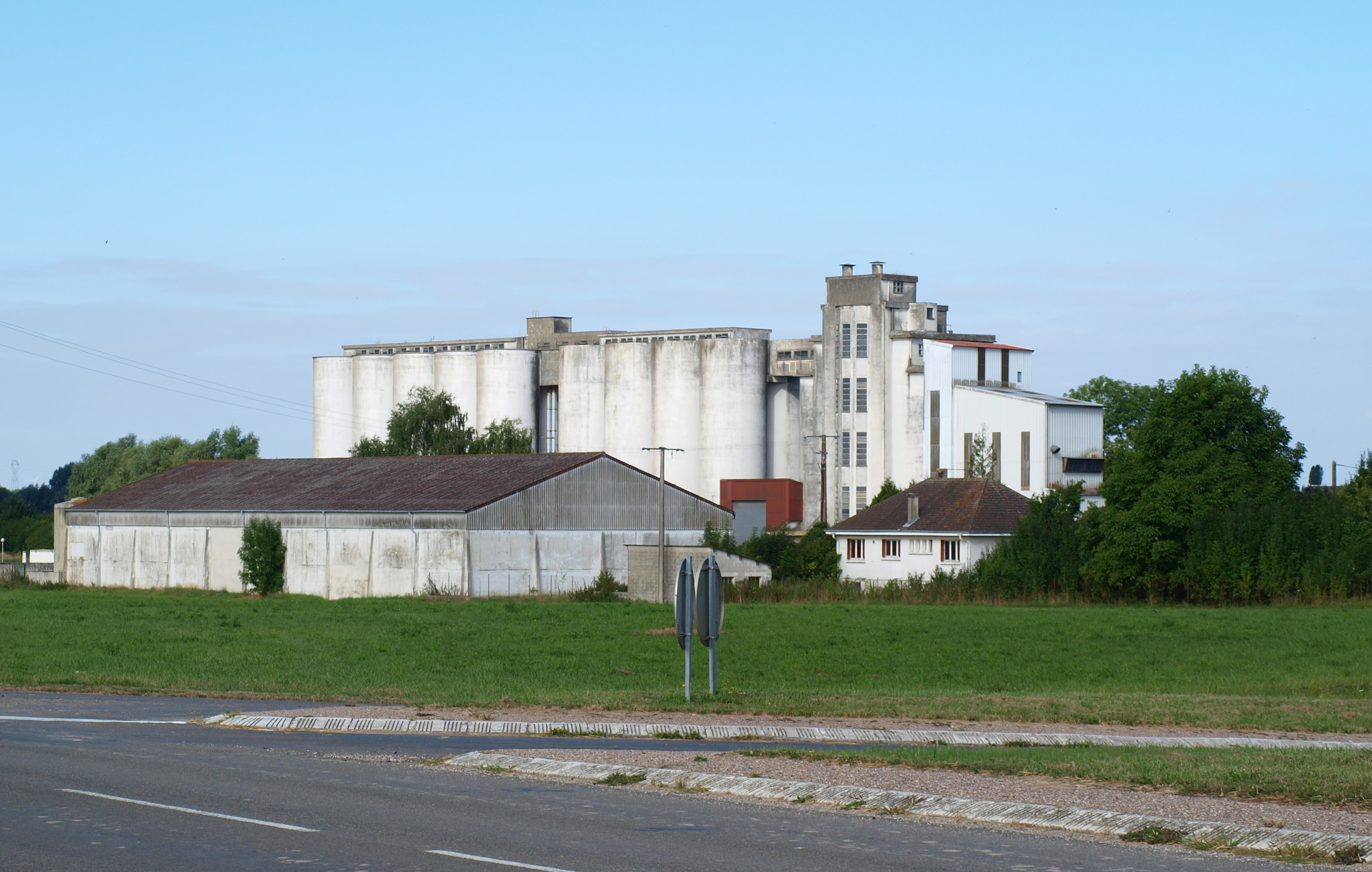
The cereal factory next to the Canal des Ardennes

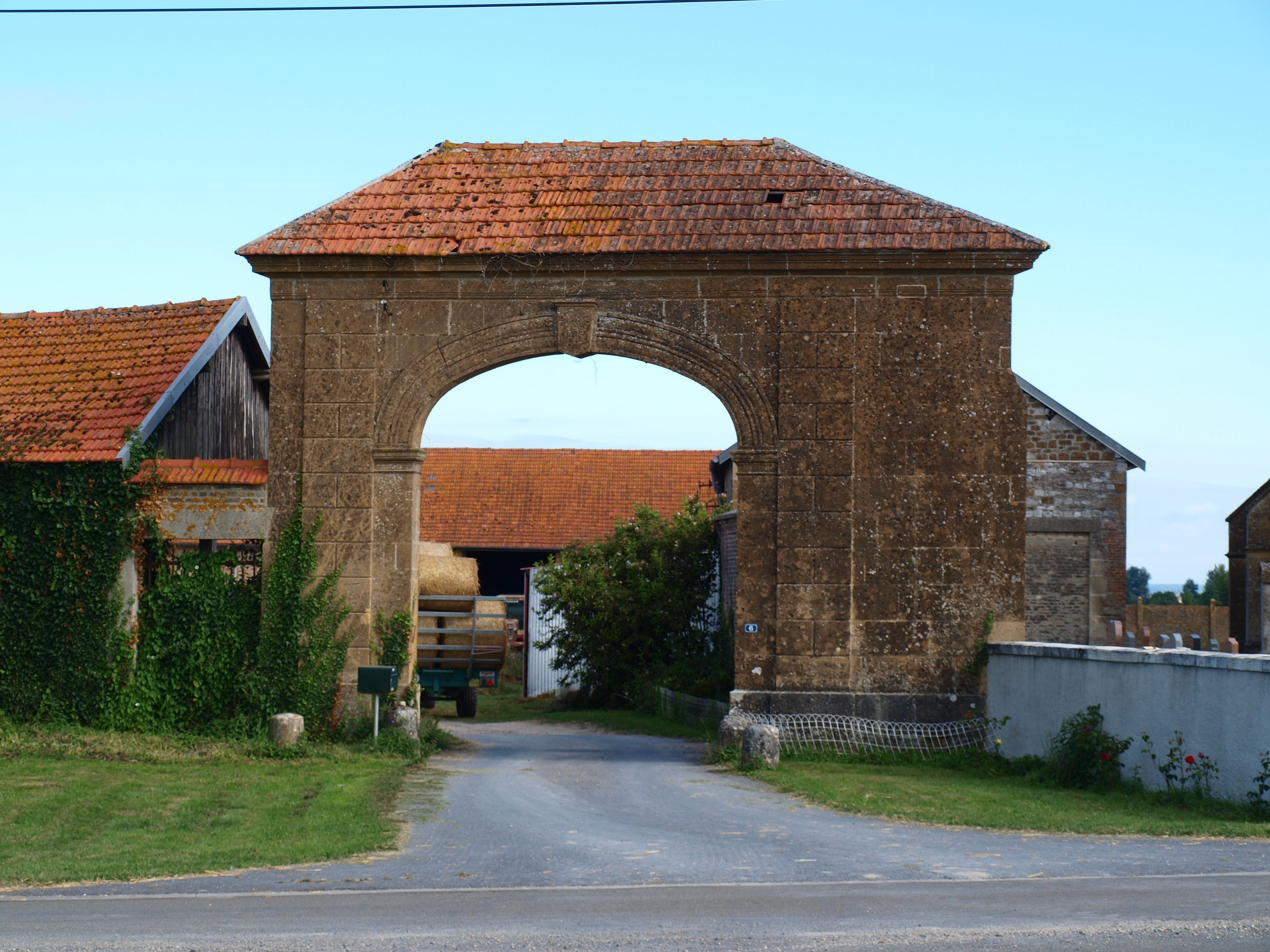
Entrance gate to the farm next to the church

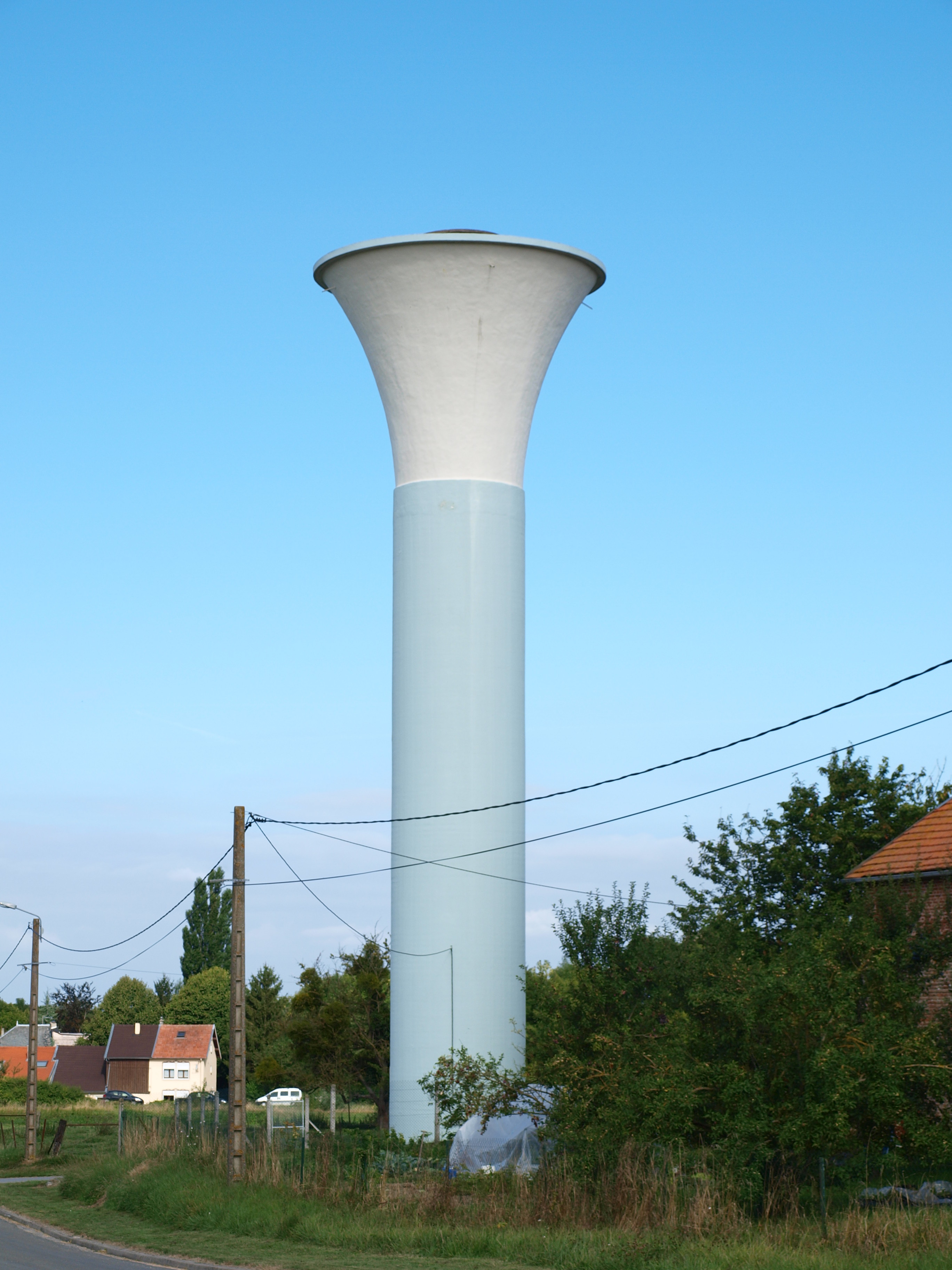
The Water tower

== See also ==
- Communes of the Ardennes department
