= Doux =

Doux is the French and Greek (δούξ) term for "duke". It may refer to:

- Doux, Ardennes, a French commune in the Ardennes department
- Doux, Deux-Sèvres, a French commune in the Deux-Sèvres department
- Doux (river), a tributary of the Rhône in southern France
- Doux (wine), a variety of sparkling wine
- Doux Group, a French poultry company
- Doux (surname)
- "Doux", a song by Jean-Michel Blais from the album Aubades
- Doux (Byzantine), a title

== See also ==
- Megas doux
- Dux (disambiguation)
