= Dux (disambiguation) =

Dux, Latin for leader, could refer to anyone who commanded troops, such as tribal leaders.

Dux or DUX may also refer to:

- DUX submachine gun, a line of submachine guns designed at the Oviedo Arsenal in Spain
- Dux (novel), a 2002 novel by Sebastiano Vassalli
- DUX (video game), a video game by HUCAST for the SEGA Dreamcast
- Dux Records, Poland
- Dux Factory, a Russian aircraft factory during World War I
- Duchcov or Dux in German, a town in Ústí nad Labem Region, Czech Republic
- Dux, the lead melody in a canon (music)
- Dux (education), the highest-ranking pupil in academic, arts or sporting achievement (Dux Litterarum, Dux Artium and Dux Ludorum respectively) in each graduating year
- Dux, biography of Benito Mussolini written by Margherita Sarfatti in 1925
- Oregon Ducks, the name of the University of Oregon sports teams

== People with the surname ==
- Claire Dux (1885–1967), German soprano
- Frank Dux (born 1956), American martial artist
- Tyson Dux (born 1978), Canadian professional wrestler

== See also ==
- Farfetch'd, a Pokémon nicknamed Dux in the original Pokémon games
- Doux (disambiguation)
