= Coucy, Ardennes =

Coucy
- Commune
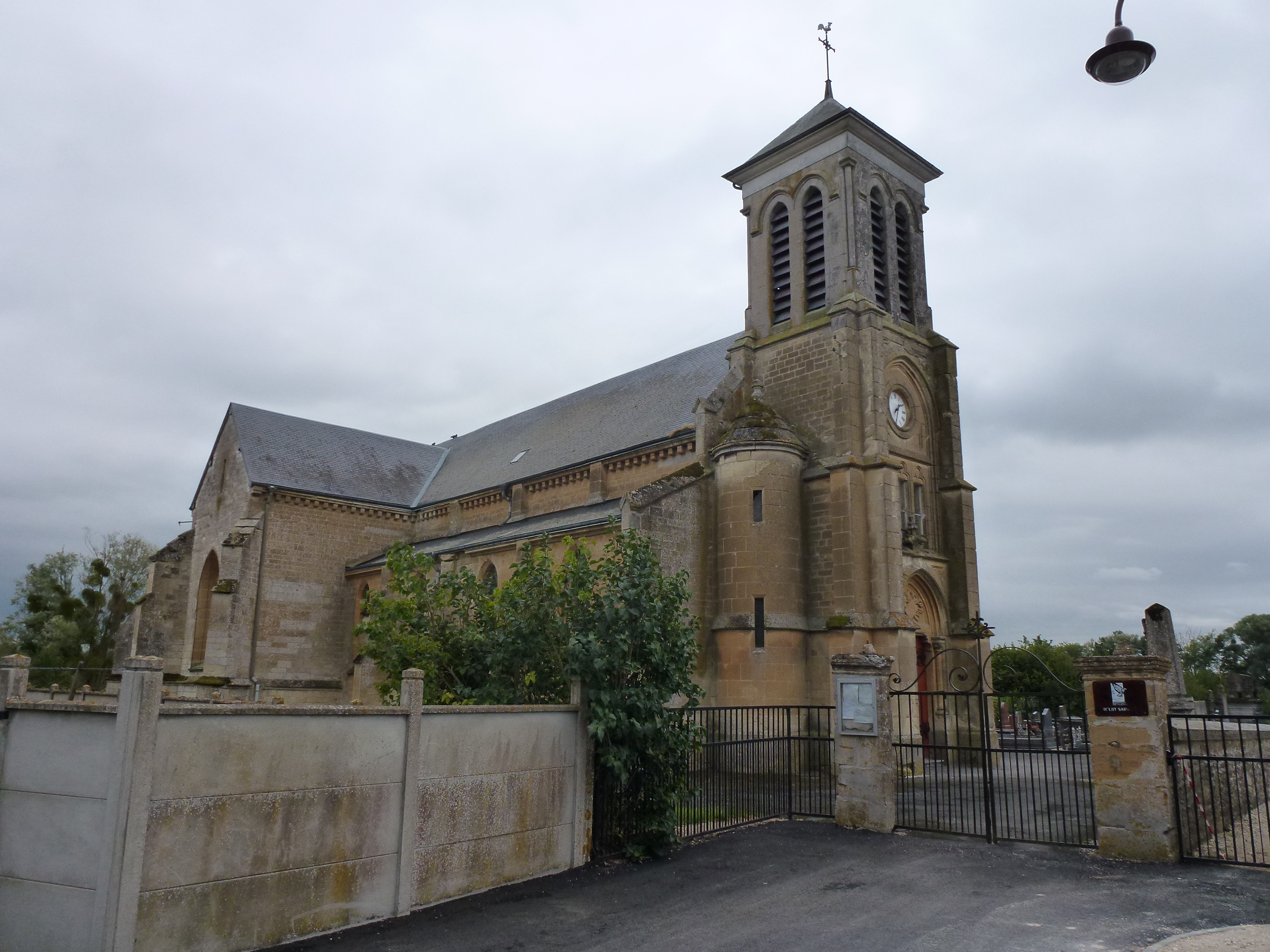
- The church in Coucy

- Coat of arms
- Location of Coucy
- Location within France Location within Grand Est
- Coordinates: 49°30′24″N 4°27′31″E
- Country: France
- Region: Grand Est
- Department: Ardennes
- Arrondissement: Rethel
- Canton: Rethel

Government
  - Mayor (2020–2026): David Potier
- Area^{1}: 6.39 km^{2} (2.47 sq mi)
- Elevation: 79 m (259 ft)
- Population (2023): 536
  - Density: 83.9/km^{2} (217/sq mi)
- Time zone: UTC+01:00 (CET)
  - Summer (DST): UTC+02:00 (CEST)
- INSEE/Postal code: 08133 /08300
- ^{1} French Land Register data, which excludes lakes, ponds, glaciers > 1 km^{2} (0.386 sq mi or 247 acres) and river estuaries.

Coucy (French pronunciation: [kusi]) is a commune in the Ardennes department in northern France.

== Population ==
Historical population
| Year | Pop. | ±% p.a. |
|---|---|---|
| 1968 | 406 | — |
| 1975 | 385 | −0.76% |
| 1982 | 460 | +2.58% |
| 1990 | 478 | +0.48% |
| 1999 | 488 | +0.23% |
| 2007 | 511 | +0.58% |
| 2012 | 521 | +0.39% |
| 2017 | 505 | −0.62% |
| 2023 | 536 | +1.00% |
Source: INSEE

== See also ==
- Communes of the Ardennes department
