= Thugny-Trugny =

- Commune
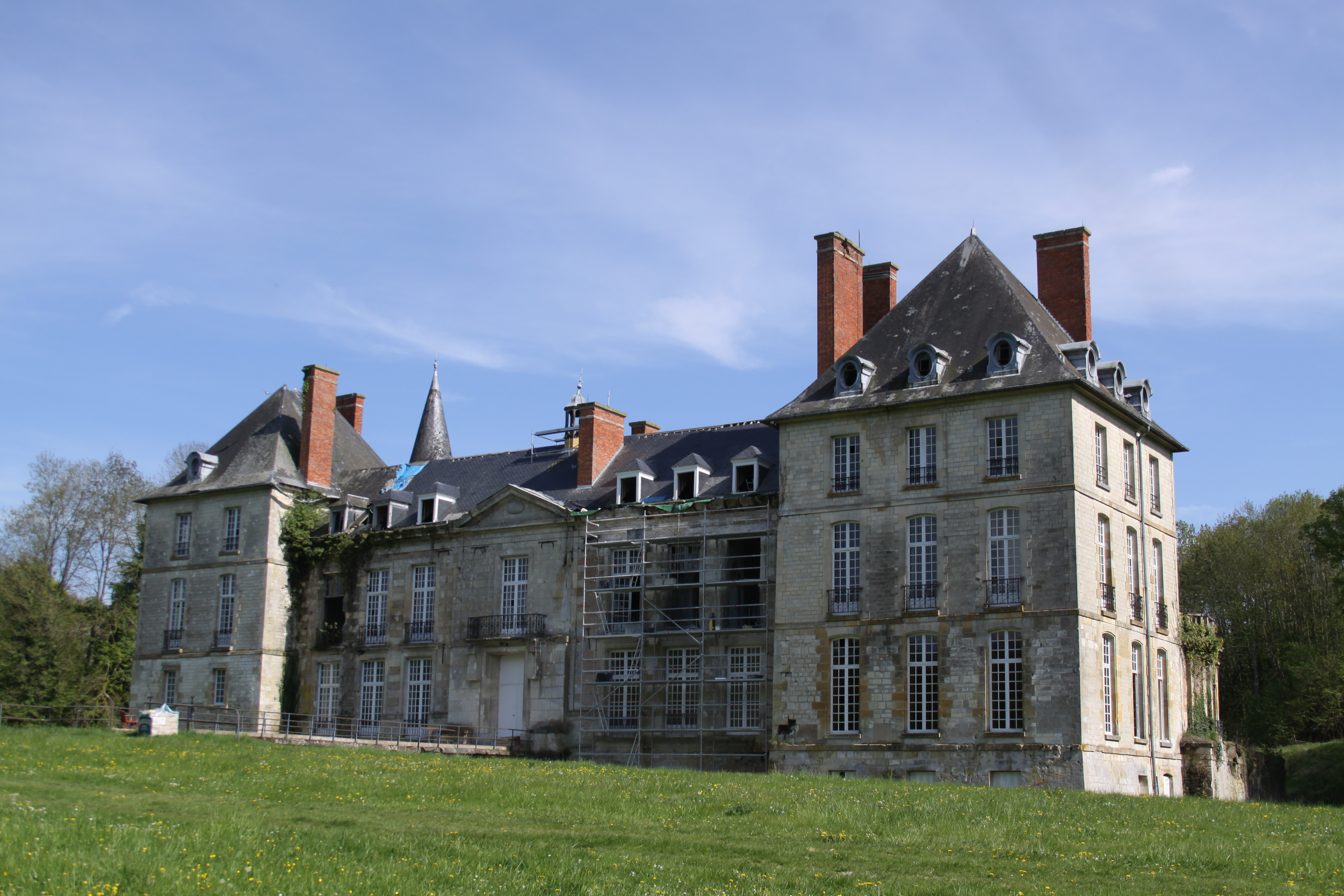
- Chateau

- Coat of arms
- Location of Thugny-Trugny
- Location within France Location within Grand Est
- Coordinates: 49°29′06″N 4°25′30″E
- Country: France
- Region: Grand Est
- Department: Ardennes
- Arrondissement: Rethel
- Canton: Rethel

Government
  - Mayor (2020–2026): Viviane Cousinard
- Area^{1}: 13.41 km^{2} (5.18 sq mi)
- Elevation: 114 m (374 ft)
- Population (2023): 243
  - Density: 18.1/km^{2} (46.9/sq mi)
- Time zone: UTC+01:00 (CET)
  - Summer (DST): UTC+02:00 (CEST)
- INSEE/Postal code: 08452 /08300
- ^{1} French Land Register data, which excludes lakes, ponds, glaciers > 1 km^{2} (0.386 sq mi or 247 acres) and river estuaries.

Thugny-Trugny (French pronunciation: [tyɲi tʁyɲi]) is a commune in the Ardennes department in northern France.

== Population ==
Historical population
Year	Pop.	±% p.a.
1968	259	—
1975	237	−1.26%
1982	220	−1.06%
1990	227	+0.39%
1999	243	+0.76%
2007	215	−1.52%
2012	243	+2.48%
2017	266	+1.83%
2023	243	−1.50%
Source: INSEE

== See also ==
- Communes of the Ardennes department
