= Sault-lès-Rethel =

- Commune
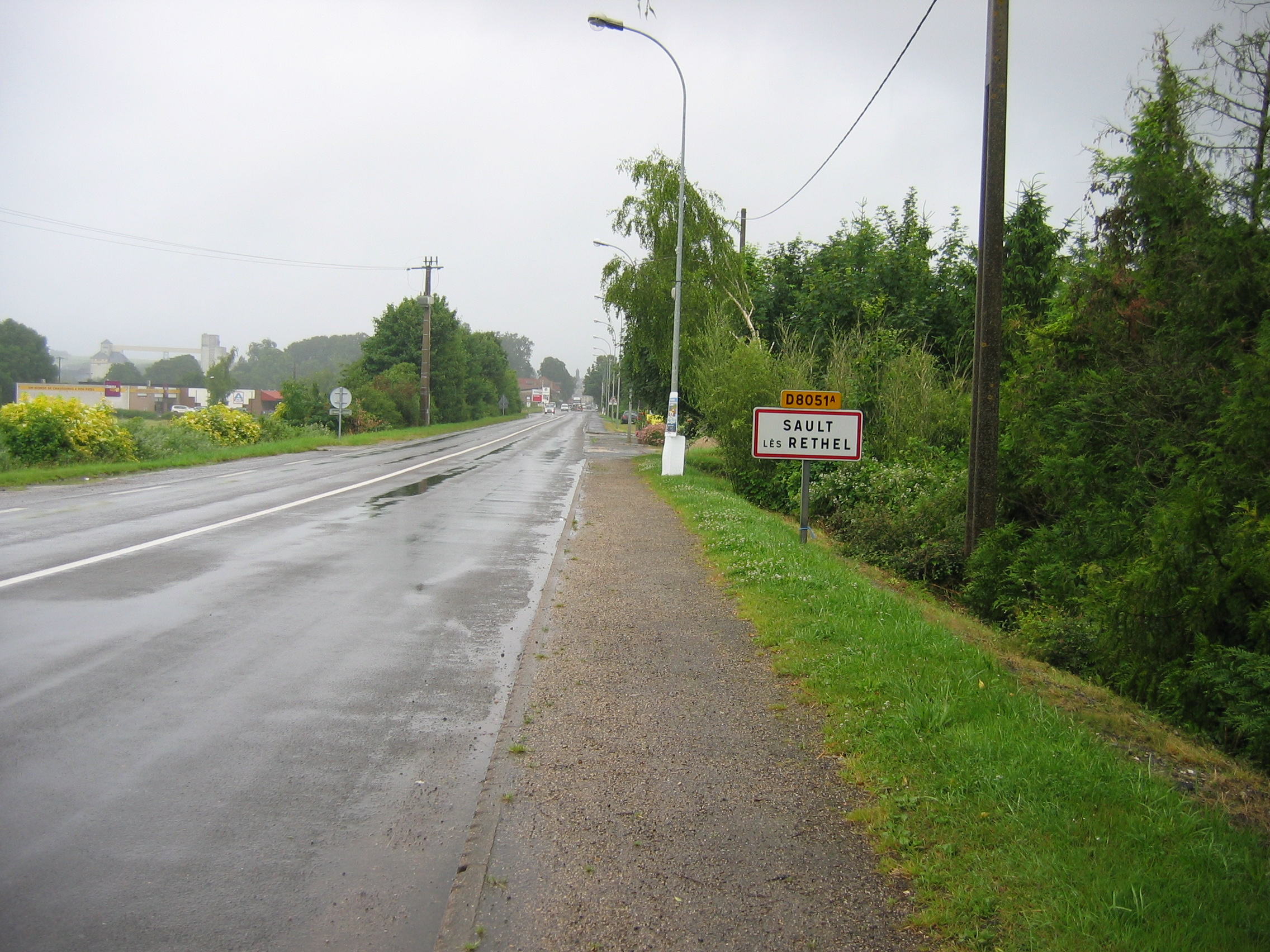
- Entrance to the village
- Location of Sault-lès-Rethel
- Location within France Location within Grand Est
- Coordinates: 49°29′47″N 4°21′59″E
- Country: France
- Region: Grand Est
- Department: Ardennes
- Arrondissement: Rethel
- Canton: Rethel

Government
  - Mayor (2020–2026): Michel Kociuba
- Area^{1}: 6.45 km^{2} (2.49 sq mi)
- Elevation: 74 m (243 ft)
- Population (2023): 1,900
  - Density: 290/km^{2} (760/sq mi)
- Time zone: UTC+01:00 (CET)
  - Summer (DST): UTC+02:00 (CEST)
- INSEE/Postal code: 08403 /08300
- ^{1} French Land Register data, which excludes lakes, ponds, glaciers > 1 km^{2} (0.386 sq mi or 247 acres) and river estuaries.

Sault-lès-Rethel (French pronunciation: [so lɛ ʁətɛl], literally Sault near Rethel) is a commune in the Ardennes department in northern France.

== Population ==
Historical population
Year	Pop.	±% p.a.
1968	1,599	—
1975	2,018	+3.38%
1982	2,116	+0.68%
1990	2,067	−0.29%
1999	1,919	−0.82%
2007	1,877	−0.28%
2012	1,923	+0.49%
2017	1,915	−0.08%
2023	1,900	−0.13%
Source: INSEE

== See also ==
- Communes of the Ardennes department
