= Canton of Rethel =

Canton of France

Coordinates: 49.51°N 4.37°E

- Canton
- Situation of the canton of Rethel in the department of Ardennes
- Country: France
- Region: Grand Est
- Department: Ardennes
- No. of communes: {{{nbcomm}}}
- Population (2023): 14,142
- INSEE code: 0811

The canton of Rethel is an administrative division of the Ardennes department, northern France. Its borders were modified at the French canton reorganisation which came into effect in March 2015. Its seat is in Rethel.

It consists of the following communes:

1. Acy-Romance
2. Amagne
3. Ambly-Fleury
4. Arnicourt
5. Barby
6. Bertoncourt
7. Biermes
8. Corny-Machéroménil
9. Coucy
10. Doux
11. Mont-Laurent
12. Nanteuil-sur-Aisne
13. Novy-Chevrières
14. Rethel
15. Sault-lès-Rethel
16. Seuil
17. Sorbon
18. Thugny-Trugny
