= La morte di Marx e altri racconti =

- Author: Sebastiano Vassalli
- Original title: La morte di Marx e altri racconti
- Language: Italian
- Publisher: Einaudi
- Publication date: 2007
- ISBN: 9788806180607

La Morte di Marx e altri racconti (Death of Marx and other tales) is a collection of short tales written by the Italian author Sebastiano Vassalli, published by Einaudi in 2007.

Through his tales, Vassalli explores different aspects of the human soul in the modern age, analyzing how this historical period is affecting the life and the behaviour of people nowadays.

== Themes ==
Sebastiano Vassalli began writing the stories that ended in this collection in 2000. Later on, he assembled all the materials he had produced and organized them in three different thematic areas:

The first part, entitled Ciao Kafka (Hello, Kafka), is composed of eight stories, focused on the extreme connection between modern men and technology. In particular, all these tales revolve around drivers and cars, here shown as new deities capable of changing people's lives. The references to Franz Kafka, that open and conclude this first chapter, underline both the alienation felt (consciously or not) by the characters and the metamorphosis some of them arrive to accomplish because of their cars. For instance, in “Morte di un commesso viaggiatore” (“Death of a travelling clerk”), Vassalli tells the story of a salesperson found dead in his car, which is going to be destroyed. Though he has been missing for a fairly long time, his wife doesn't care about his disappearance, believing he had run away with one of his lovers. Or, in another story, we’re told about a boy who wants to be “like a videogame character”, and therefore ends up killing a child while racing in the street in a driving competition.

The second part, La Morte di Marx e altri racconti (Death of Marx and other tales), hence the name of the collection, explores the idea of equality in our society, that leads to Marx's metaphorical death; in these five stories, Vassalli describes the way people can be seen as equals a hundred and fifty years after the diffusion of Karl Marx’s ideals: we can all wear the same clothes, we can all watch the same programs on tv, we can all gather in the same places to have fun in controversial ways. The first story exemplifies Marx’s death through the murder of his “twin”, an intellectual nicknamed Marx because of the resemblance with the philosopher, who's been killed by one of his violent male lovers. The best example of Vassalli's satire can be found in a dialogue in which a “good citizen” who votes in the election and a “bad one” who abstains from expressing a political preference discuss the merit of a modern democracy, in which we are seen as numbers to win the leading position, rather than citizens with rights to guarantee.

The third and last part, Dopotutto, è amore – sei storie per il terzo millennio (It’s love, after all – six stories for the third millennium) is a portrait of unusual, alternative romantic relationships or love in general. These were the first tales Vassalli had written, back in 2000 and 2001, and they break with traditional, stereotypical ideals of love life, romance and infatuation, exploring feelings such as disappointment, jealousy, sexual desire and various forms of perversion. In this part, for example, we are told about Sebastiano, a writer who feels a sweet affection towards a Nigerian prostitute who begs his help after she's been beaten by one of her previous clients. This casual meeting, anyway, won't be the only occasion Sebastiano and the girl's lives will cross, as the writer will discover later on in the tale. Moreover, another story is about a pedophile called Leonid, who briefly recalls the crimes that will lead him to the electric chair.

== Prose ==
Sabastiano Vassalli employs a witty, direct style, often mixing everyday language with a more formal syntax, to underline the personalities and the social status of his characters. As stated by the author himself in a note at the end of the book, “we must try, once again, to be ‘absolutely modern’ ” in opposition to the writers of the beginning of the century, already considered obsolete.
