= Barby, Ardennes =

Barby
- Commune
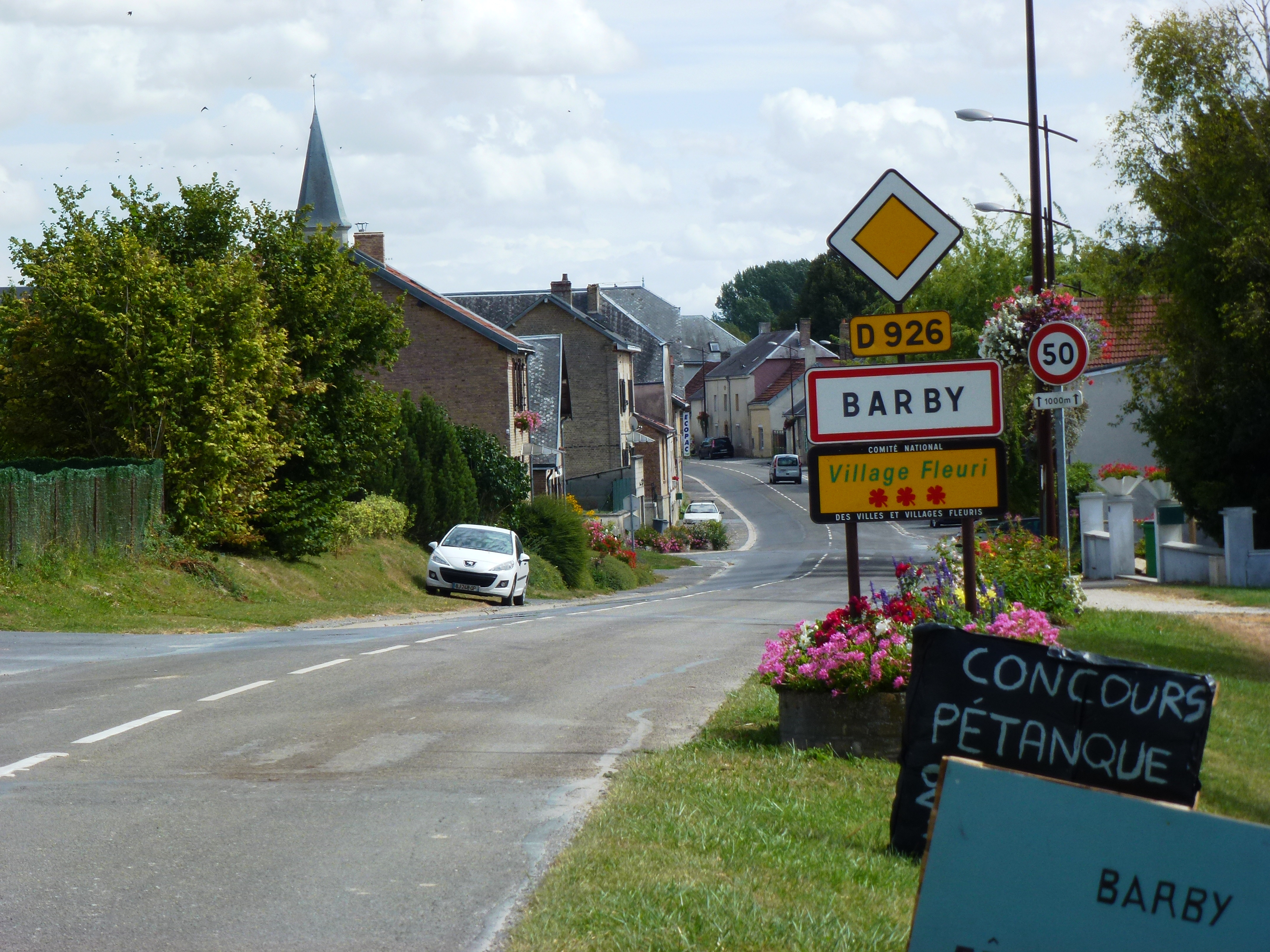
- The road into Barby
- Location of Barby
- Location within France Location within Grand Est
- Coordinates: 49°31′22″N 4°18′49″E
- Country: France
- Region: Grand Est
- Department: Ardennes
- Arrondissement: Rethel
- Canton: Rethel
- Intercommunality: Pays Rethélois

Government
  - Mayor (2020–2026): Christian Noizet
- Area^{1}: 11.32 km^{2} (4.37 sq mi)
- Elevation: 73 m (240 ft)
- Highest elevation: 142 m (466 ft)
- Lowest elevation: 66 m (217 ft)
- Population (2023): 389
  - Density: 34.4/km^{2} (89.0/sq mi)
- Time zone: UTC+01:00 (CET)
  - Summer (DST): UTC+02:00 (CEST)
- INSEE/Postal code: 08048 /08300
- ^{1} French Land Register data, which excludes lakes, ponds, glaciers > 1 km^{2} (0.386 sq mi or 247 acres) and river estuaries.

Barby (French pronunciation: [baʁbi]) is a commune in the Ardennes department in the Grand Est region of northern France.

The commune has been awarded three flowers by the National Council of Towns and Villages in Bloom in the Competition of cities and villages in Bloom.

== Geography ==
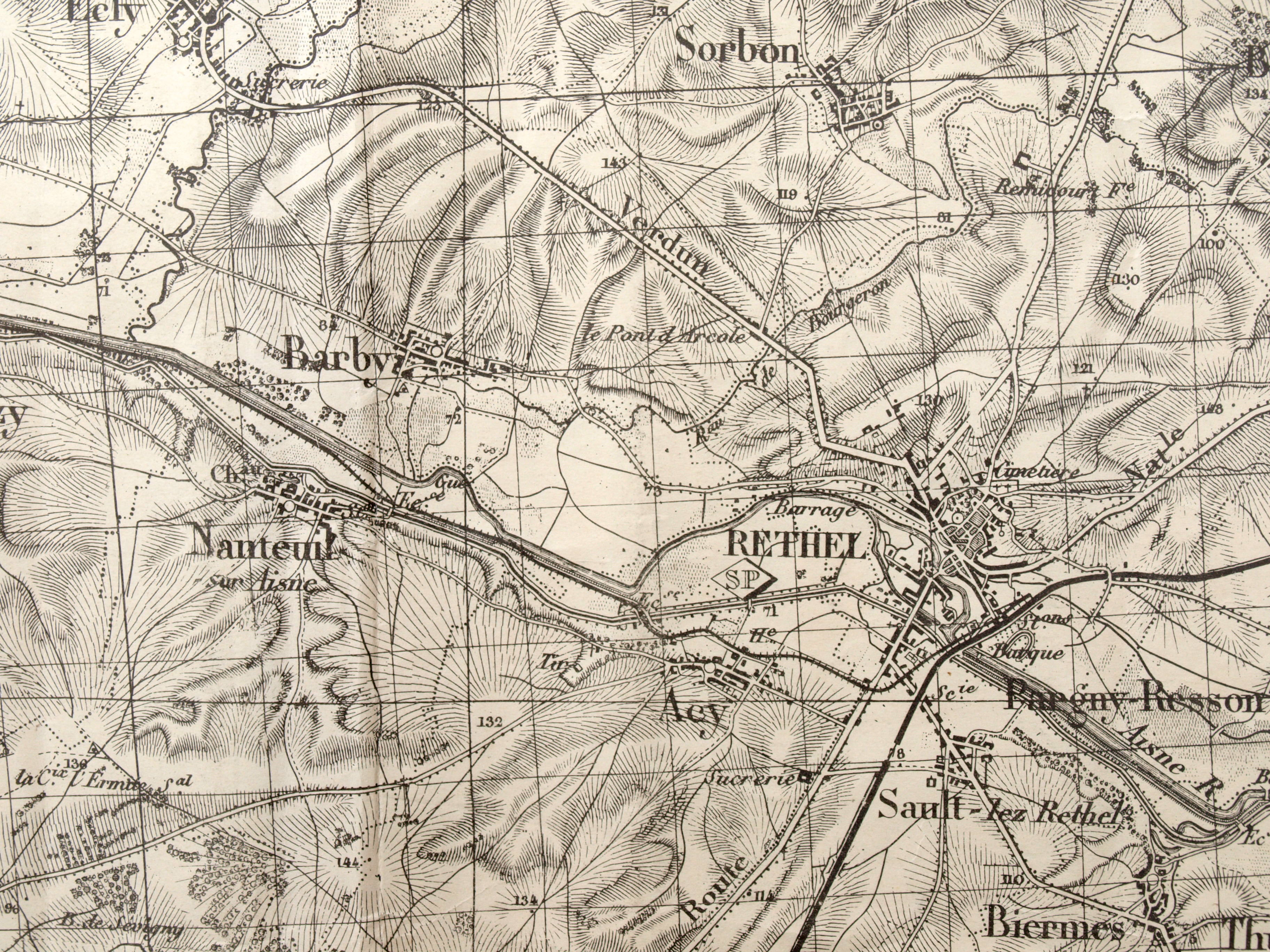
1935 Map of Barby

Barby is located immediately north-west of Rethel and immediately south-east of Château-Porcien. Access to the commune is by the D926 road from Rethel which passes through the heart of the commune and the village before continuing north-west to Château-Porcien. The D946 from Rethel passes through the north of the commune as it goes north-west to Seraincourt. The commune is entirely farmland.

The Aisne river passes through the south-east of the commune forming a small part of the south-eastern border as it flows west to eventually join the Oise at Compiègne. The Vaux river flows south, forming the western border of the commune, to join the Aisne just outside the south-western tip of the commune. The Ruisseau de Bourgeron flows from the north-east through the commune and the village and joins the Aisne on the southern border. The Canal des Ardennes is parallel to and south of the Aisne and forms a small portion of the southern border of the commune.

=== Climate ===
July and August are very hot and dry with temperatures up to 38 °C. Even so, rainfall is more frequent in summer, but the winters are shorter and less severe. The cold weather lasts only from October to March which favours corn crops and especially Kitchen gardens.

== History ==
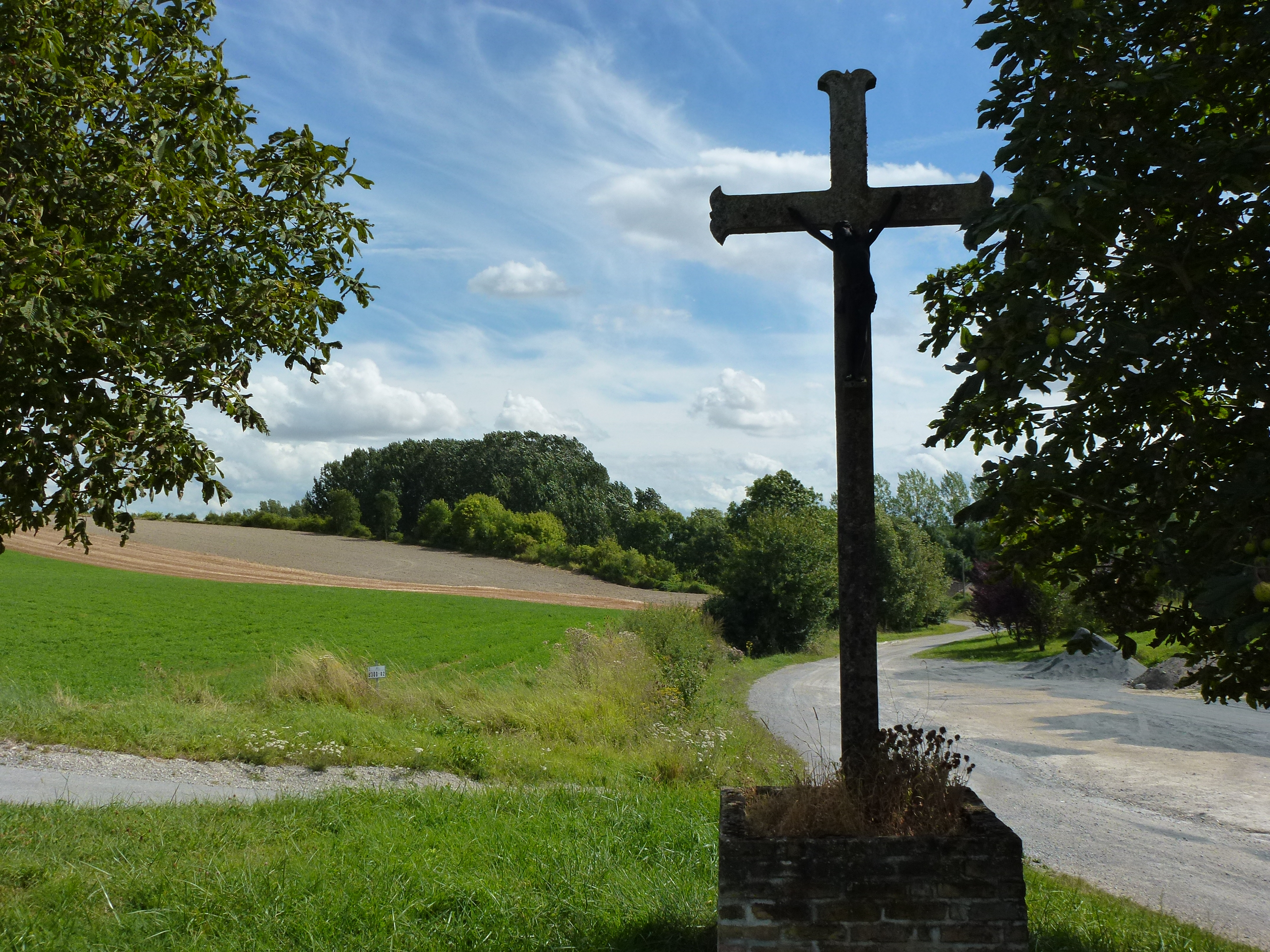
A Wayside Cross on the presumed site of the birthplace of Jean de Gerson

Excavations have uncovered a Bronze Age tomb in Barby and the village is traversed by the old Roman road from Rethel to Château-Porcien.

The village of Gerson was located on the current territory of the commune in the Middle Ages but is now gone. It was at Gerson that Jean Charlier de Gerson, Chancellor of the University of Paris (nicknamed Doctor Christianissimus), was born in 1363. A Wayside cross marks the place which traditionally is his birthplace. The commune named the Rue Gerson after him and the parish built a monument in the church during its construction in 1880 or 1881.

Barby appears as Barby on the 1750 Cassini Map and the same on the 1790 version.

== Administration ==
List of Successive Mayors

From	To	Name
1977	1995	Jean Féquant
1995	2004	Jean-Marie Renard
2004	2005	Louis Tanton
2005	2026	Christian Noizet

== Demography ==
The inhabitants of the commune are known as Barbyons or Barbyonnes in French.

Historical population

Year	Pop.	±% p.a.
1793	394	—
1821	498	+0.84%
1846	593	+0.70%
1866	476	−1.09%
1872	398	−2.94%
1901	308	−0.88%
1911	301	−0.23%
1926	275	−0.60%
1946	187	−1.91%
1962	234	+1.41%

Year	Pop.	±% p.a.
1968	209	−1.87%
1975	211	+0.14%
1982	347	+7.37%
1990	384	+1.27%
1999	352	−0.96%
2007	369	+0.59%
2012	379	+0.54%
2017	415	+1.83%
2023	389	−1.07%

Source: EHESS (1793-2006) and INSEE (1968-2023)

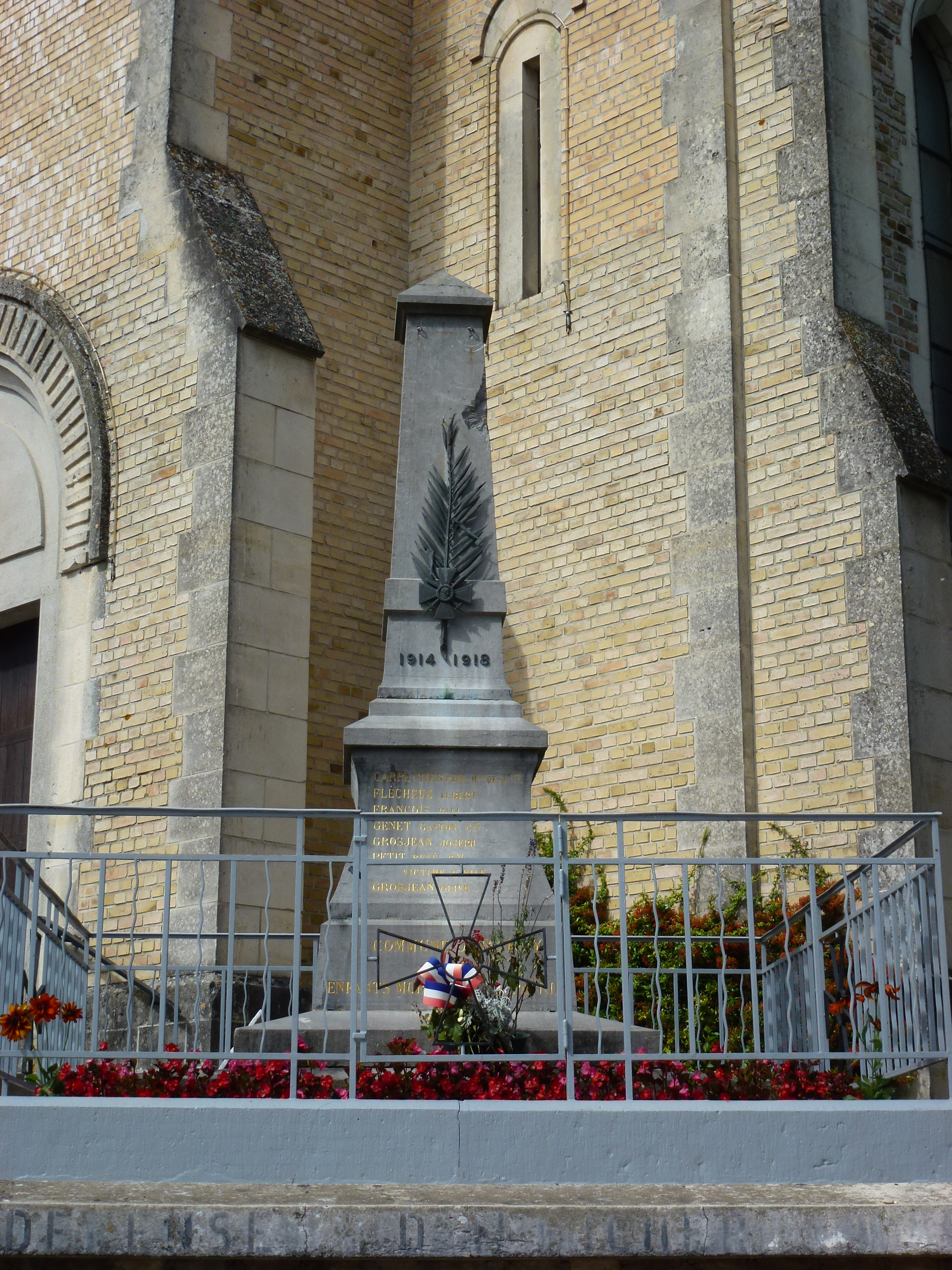
The War Memorial

== Economy ==
Barby is a rural commune characterised by agriculture. The wheat harvest wheat is a highlight of life in the commune.

== Sites and Monuments ==
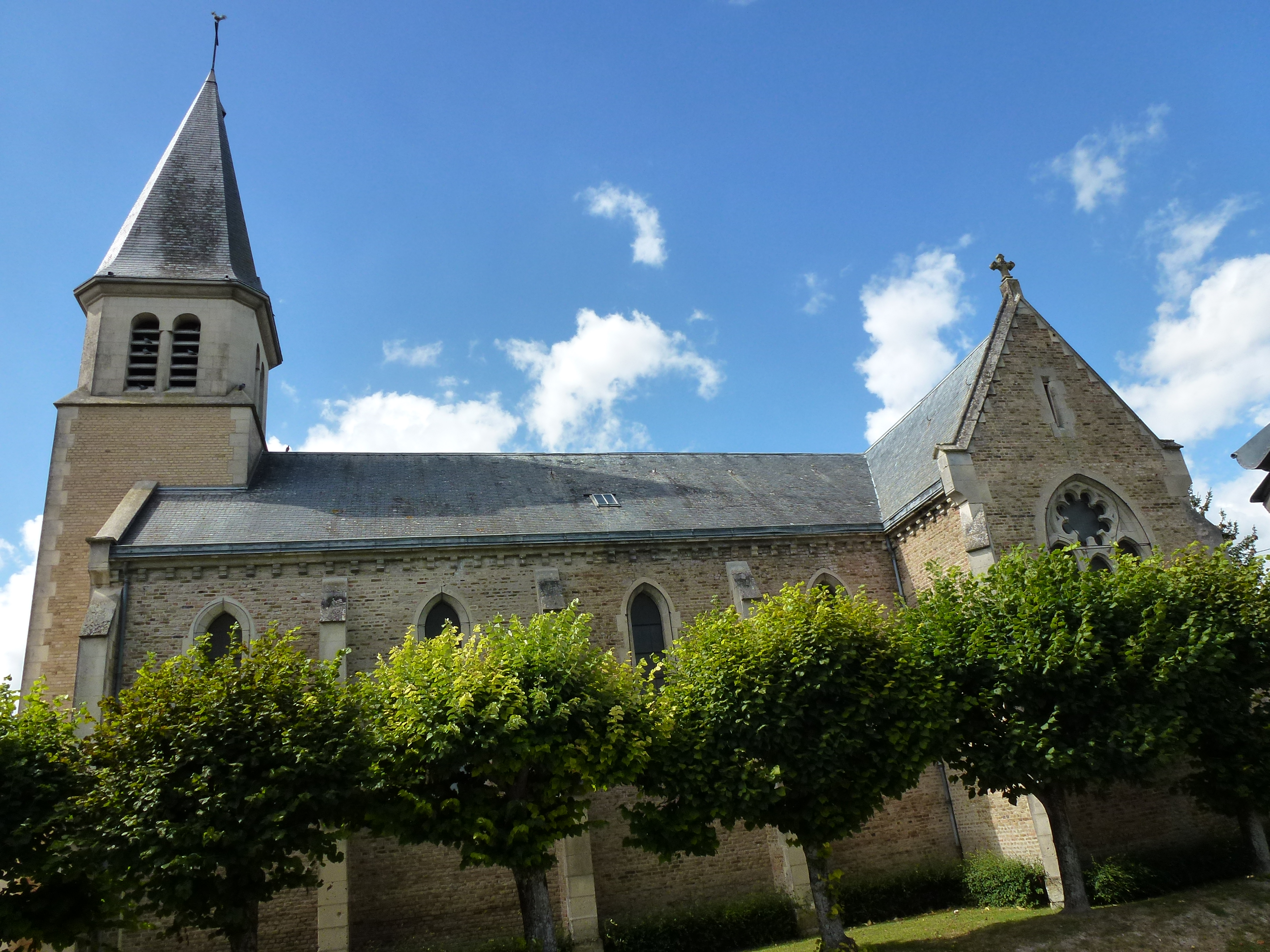
The Church of Saint John the Baptist

- The Church of Saint John the Baptist dates from 1880. The Church contains many items that are registered as historical objects:
  - A Baptismal font (15th century)
  - 2 Statues: Virgin of Pity and Saints John the Baptist and John the Evangelist (15th century)
  - A Painting: The beheading of Saint John the Baptist (15th century)
  - An Altar and Retable (15th century)
  - A Statue: Saint Barbe (16th century)
  - A Statue: Saint John the Baptist (17th century)
  - A Statue: Saint Hubert (17th century)
  - A Funeral Plaque for Elisabeth la Chardenière, mother of Jean Gerson (16th century)
- La Crauye, a chalk quarry north of the village.
- Les Bœufs Blancs (The White Oxen), a beach on the Aisne.

== Notable people linked to the commune ==
- Jean Charlier de Gerson (1363-1429), Chancellor of the University of Paris.
- Gérard Tène (or Thène), a labourer at Barby in 1644 and his son, Joseph Taine - also a labourer at Barby, were the ancestors of Hippolyte Taine.
- Eugène Marquigny, a Jesuit and writer born in 1836 at Barby.
- Guy Féquant, writer, born in 1949 at Barby

== See also ==
- Communes of the Ardennes department
