= An infinite number =

1999 novel by Sebastiano Vassalli

- Author: Sebastiano Vassalli
- Original title: Un infinito numero
- Language: Italian
- Genre: Historical fiction, fantasy
- Publisher: Giulio Einaudi Editore
- Publication date: 1999
- Publication place: Italy
- Pages: 257
- ISBN: 978-88-06-22722-7

Un infinito numero ("An infinite number") is a novel written by Sebastiano Vassali which has been published in 1999, 2001 and 2015 by the publishing house Einaudi.

The title is related to the fact that history is a continuous repetition of events and human beings.

== Plot ==
The novel is based on the monologue of Timodemo, who was born in Nauplia (Greece). When he was a child, he was abandoned by his mother and given to a slave trader called Musodoro. He was educated by Quinzione and he was taken to Naples where he was bought by Virgil as his secretary. He started living with the writer, who had to write a poem celebrating the origins of Rome.

The Etruscan Mecenate, who was responsible for culture and the artists in the capital city, suggested Virgil should go on a journey to the Rasna's country to discover the past of this civilization and to find out why they didn't have a written tradition. The travellers are Mecenate, Virgilio, Timodemo, Tanai, Sarmento and the dancers Tecmessa and Ninfa.

After a long time, these travellers reached the towns of Surina and Arezzo, where Mecenate settled his accounts with two administrators who had taken advantage of his property during his absence.

Finally they arrived in Sacni, the holy town of Rasna, and while they were waiting for meeting the high priest of the god Velthune, they visited the temples dedicated to Velthune, the god life, Northia, personification of time, and Mantus, god of death and the underworld.

When the sky is favourable to their visit, they embarked an adventure in the Mantus' temple: they went on a journey in the past, and they could live in first person the “infinite number” of past lives, experiencing the mysteries concerning the birth of Rome, the Rasna's relationship with history, memory and writing.

After escaping from Troy, Eneas and the Lidi disembarked on the Lazio's shores, where they massacred the local population ... and the real history of the origin of Rome is shown. They killed all men and they exploited women and their land.

Certainly the Eneas' figure is highlighted, which is very different from the classic one, transmitted during the centuries: he was a fat, cruel, dirty and smelly man.

Some days after the reawakening, Mecenate, Virgilio and Timodemo met Aisna, the high priest of the temple of Velthune, and they discussed the reasons why a very developed civilization, whose citizens were able to write, hadn't a written tradition. Aisna claimed that the writing is like death, the words are a death's signal and only who hasn't a name will be immortal.

Aisna decided to show the deathly power of the writing and he wrote his name, his mother's one and his daughter's one: within the day after this people would die. As the high priest had announced, that day was the end of the Rasna's era: the last nail was placed on the wall of the Nurthia's temple, the calendar of that civilization.

When the journey was finished, Virgil was constantly subjected to Octavius' pressing requests for the realization of the Aeneid, whose draft was constantly modified.

In the last months of his life, Virgil went to Athens where he met the prince: the piece was still incomplete and the intention of the author was to not publish it, because the Rome and the heroes presented were not the real ones.

After the death of the poet, Timodemo and the slave Marittimo tried to escape with the manuscripts of the Aeneid, but they were discovered: Marittimo was captured and crucified and the piece was disclosed, even if Virgil's wanted to destroy it.

The publishing of the Aeneid, wanted by Lucio Vario Rufo and Plozio Tucca, facilitated the diffusion of a falsified figure of Eneas that firstly was a women and children slaughterer, but he has become the model of the perfect Roman citizen.

Timodemo could only escape from the death sentence decided by August. He moved to Apulia, he changed his identity and he continued being passionate about reading.
