= Corny-Machéroménil =

- Commune
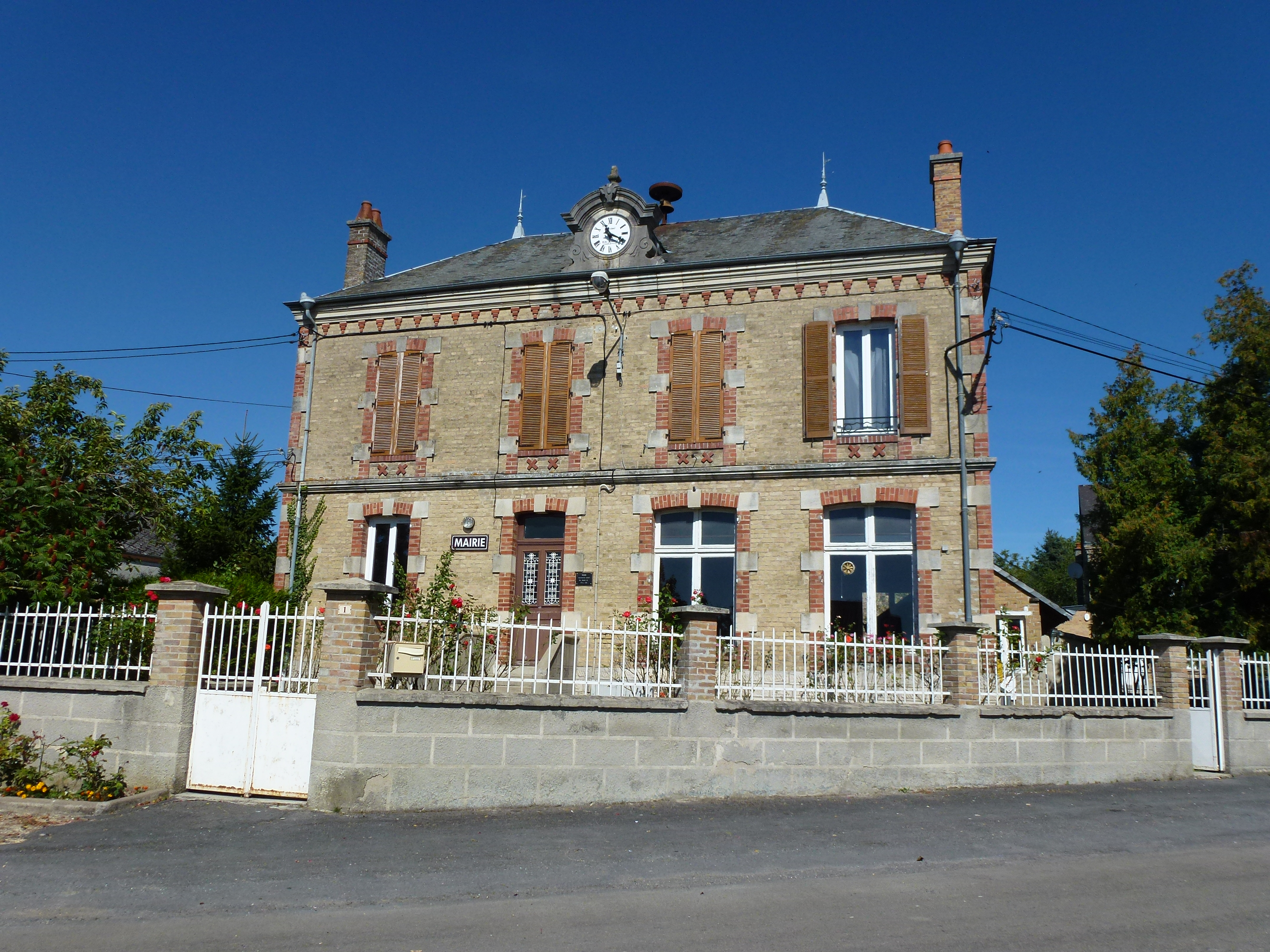
- Town hall

- Coat of arms
- Location of Corny-Machéroménil
- Location within France Location within Grand Est
- Coordinates: 49°34′44″N 4°26′38″E
- Country: France
- Region: Grand Est
- Department: Ardennes
- Arrondissement: Rethel
- Canton: Rethel

Government
  - Mayor (2020–2026): Xavier Baril
- Area^{1}: 10.54 km^{2} (4.07 sq mi)
- Elevation: 90 m (300 ft)
- Population (2023): 187
  - Density: 17.7/km^{2} (46.0/sq mi)
- Time zone: UTC+01:00 (CET)
  - Summer (DST): UTC+02:00 (CEST)
- INSEE/Postal code: 08132 /08270
- ^{1} French Land Register data, which excludes lakes, ponds, glaciers > 1 km^{2} (0.386 sq mi or 247 acres) and river estuaries.

Corny-Machéroménil (French pronunciation: [kɔʁni maʃeʁɔmenil]) is a commune in the Ardennes department in northern France.

== Population ==
Historical population
Year	Pop.	±% p.a.
1968	130	—
1975	122	−0.90%
1982	129	+0.80%
1990	142	+1.21%
1999	124	−1.49%
2007	138	+1.35%
2012	181	+5.57%
2017	193	+1.29%
2023	187	−0.52%
Source: INSEE

== See also ==
- Communes of the Ardennes department
