= Bertoncourt =

- Commune
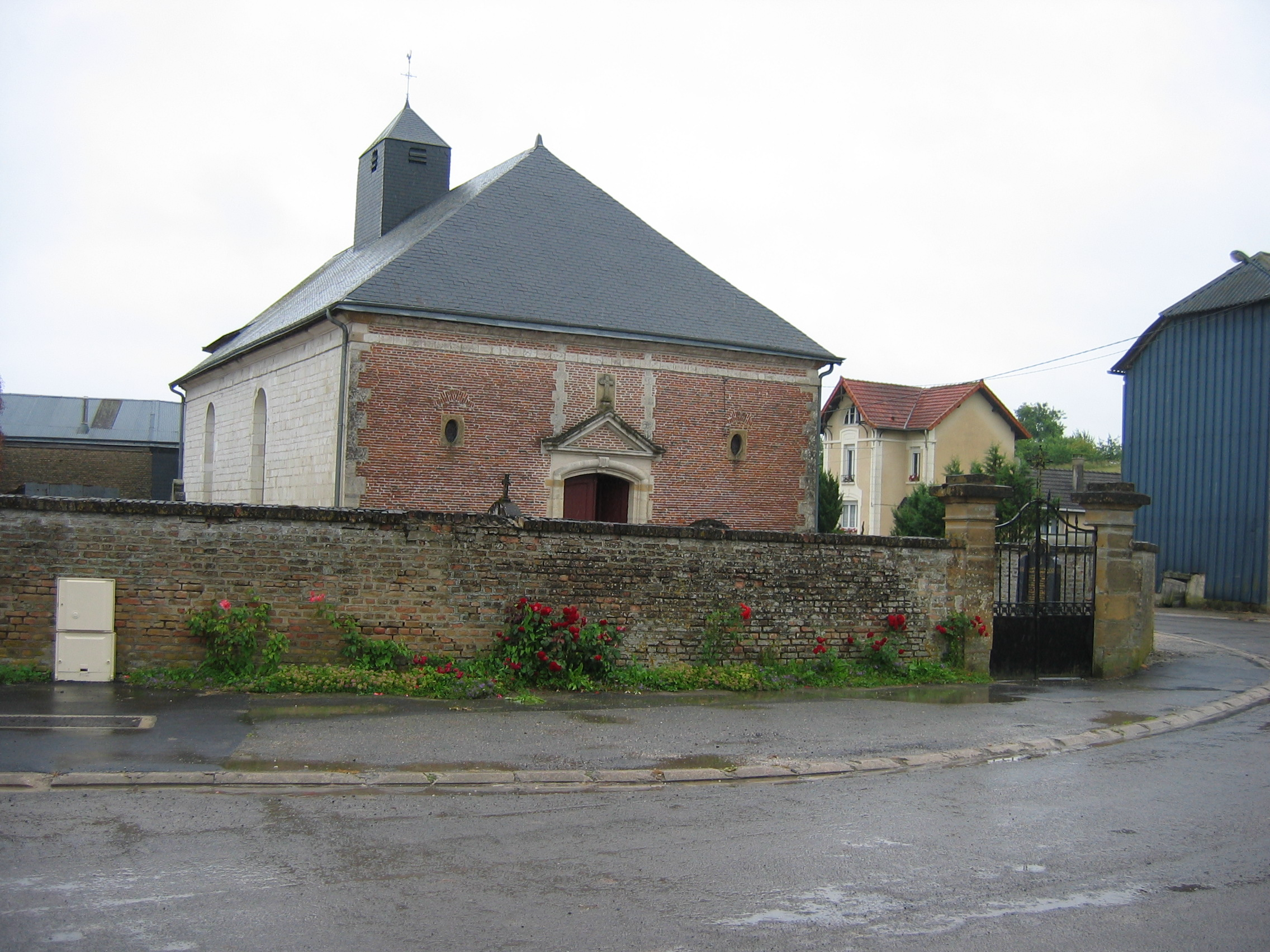
- The church in Bertoncourt

- Coat of arms
- Location of Bertoncourt
- Location within France Location within Grand Est
- Coordinates: 49°32′13″N 4°24′06″E
- Country: France
- Region: Grand Est
- Department: Ardennes
- Arrondissement: Rethel
- Canton: Rethel

Government
  - Mayor (2020–2026): Jean-Pierre Boizet
- Area^{1}: 6.83 km^{2} (2.64 sq mi)
- Elevation: 120 m (390 ft)
- Population (2023): 129
  - Density: 18.9/km^{2} (48.9/sq mi)
- Time zone: UTC+01:00 (CET)
  - Summer (DST): UTC+02:00 (CEST)
- INSEE/Postal code: 08062 /08300
- ^{1} French Land Register data, which excludes lakes, ponds, glaciers > 1 km^{2} (0.386 sq mi or 247 acres) and river estuaries.

Bertoncourt (French pronunciation: [bɛʁtɔ̃kuʁ]) is a commune in the Ardennes department in northern France.

== Population ==
Historical population
Year	Pop.	±% p.a.
1968	147	—
1975	157	+0.94%
1982	166	+0.80%
1990	147	−1.51%
1999	147	+0.00%
2007	140	−0.61%
2012	132	−1.17%
2017	127	−0.77%
2023	129	+0.26%
Source: INSEE

== See also ==
- Communes of the Ardennes department
