= Novy-Chevrières =

- Commune
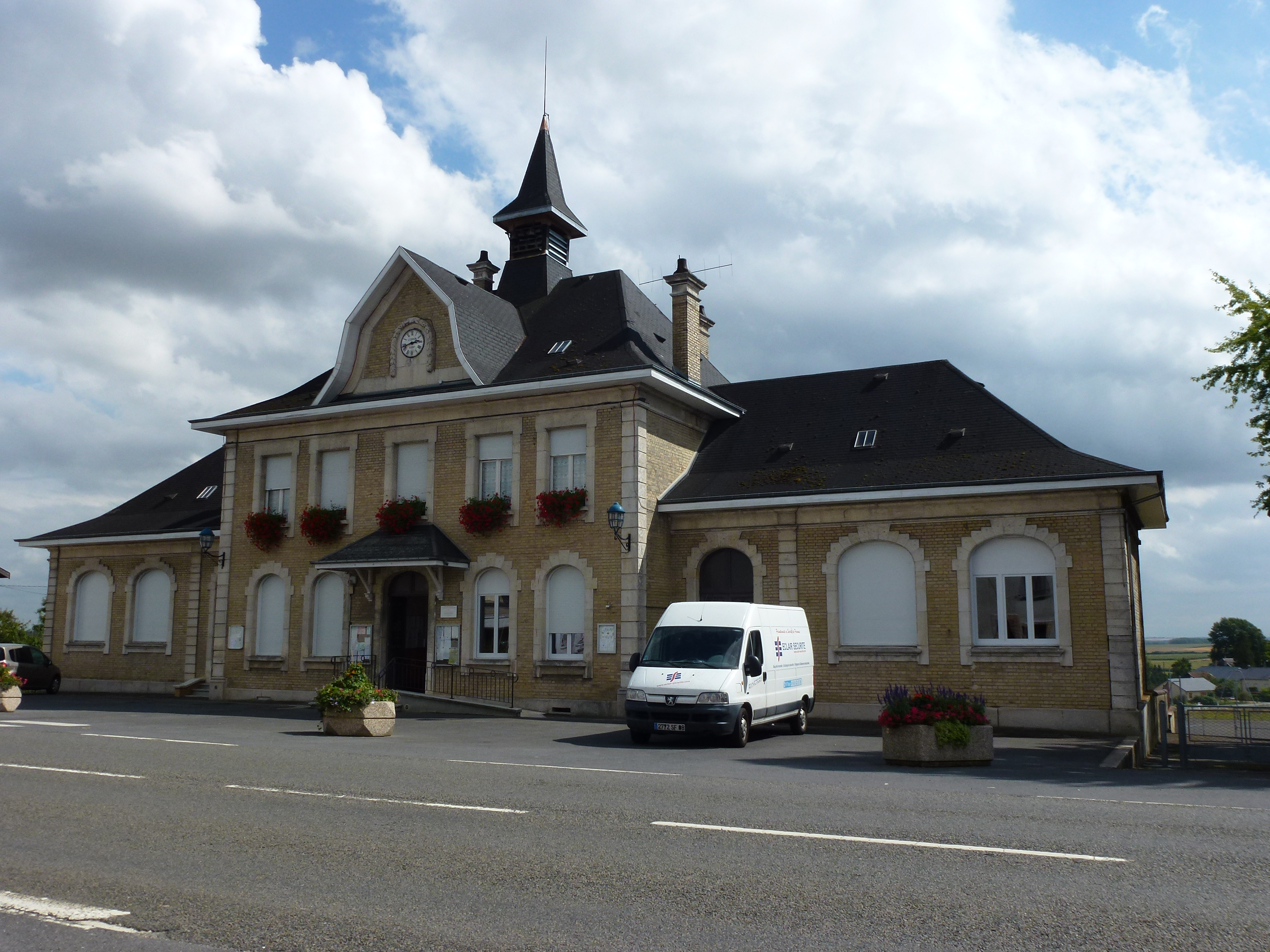
- Town hall

- Coat of arms
- Location of Novy-Chevrières
- Location within France Location within Grand Est
- Coordinates: 49°32′23″N 4°26′41″E
- Country: France
- Region: Grand Est
- Department: Ardennes
- Arrondissement: Rethel
- Canton: Rethel

Government
  - Mayor (2020–2026): Yves Beguin
- Area^{1}: 17.2 km^{2} (6.6 sq mi)
- Elevation: 105 m (344 ft)
- Population (2023): 715
  - Density: 41.6/km^{2} (108/sq mi)
- Time zone: UTC+01:00 (CET)
  - Summer (DST): UTC+02:00 (CEST)
- INSEE/Postal code: 08330 /08300
- ^{1} French Land Register data, which excludes lakes, ponds, glaciers > 1 km^{2} (0.386 sq mi or 247 acres) and river estuaries.

Novy-Chevrières (French pronunciation: [nɔvi ʃəvʁijɛʁ]) is a commune in the Ardennes department in northern France.

== Population ==
Historical population
Year	Pop.	±% p.a.
1968	476	—
1975	481	+0.15%
1982	505	+0.70%
1990	578	+1.70%
1999	549	−0.57%
2007	645	+2.03%
2012	628	−0.53%
2017	735	+3.20%
2023	715	−0.46%
Source: INSEE

== See also ==
- Communes of the Ardennes department
