= Biermes =

- Commune
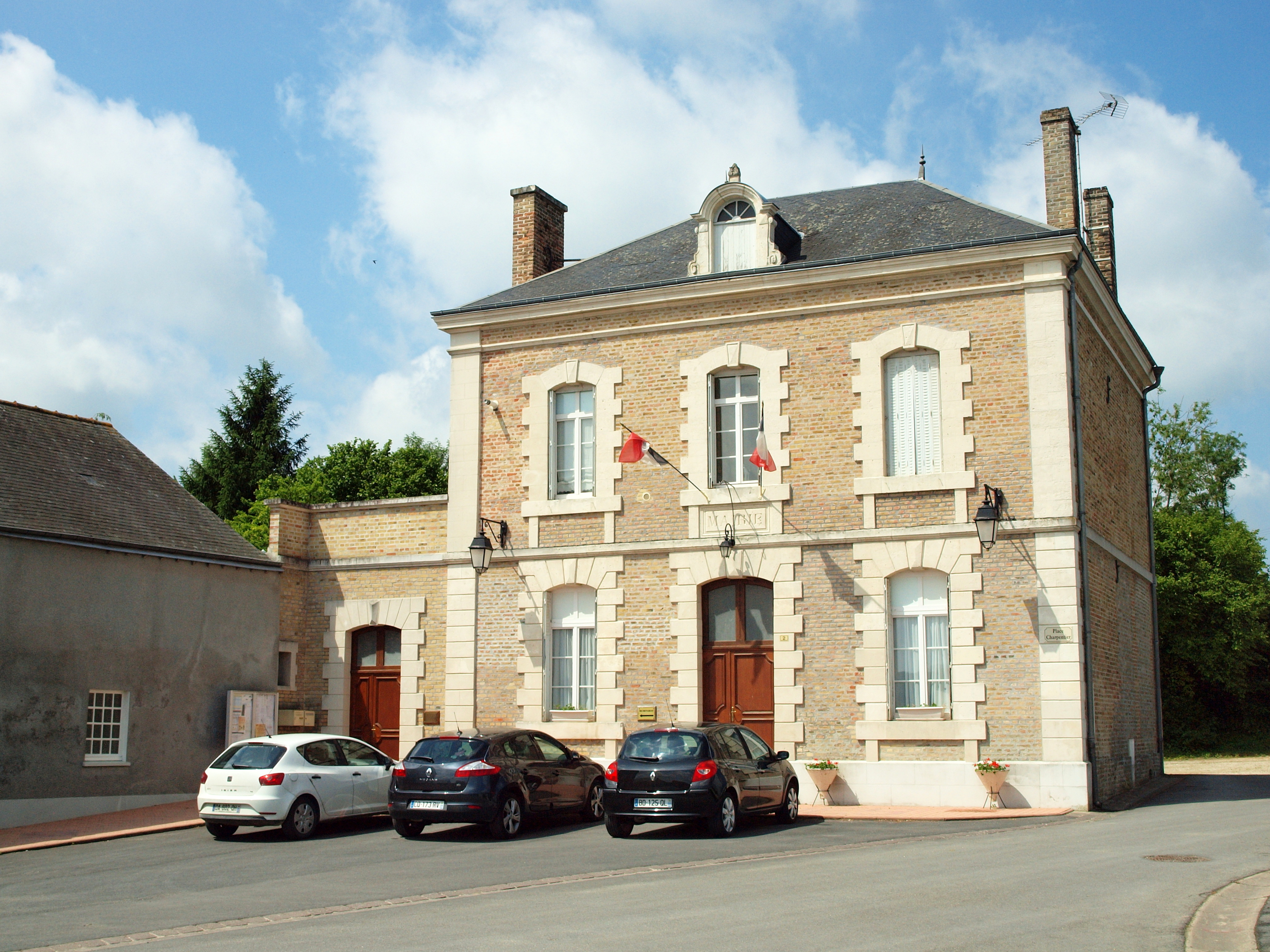
- The town hall in Biermes

- Coat of arms
- Location of Biermes
- Location within France Location within Grand Est
- Coordinates: 49°29′12″N 4°23′14″E
- Country: France
- Region: Grand Est
- Department: Ardennes
- Arrondissement: Rethel
- Canton: Rethel

Government
  - Mayor (2020–2026): Daniel Floquet
- Area^{1}: 7.96 km^{2} (3.07 sq mi)
- Elevation: 110 m (360 ft)
- Highest elevation: 146 m (479 ft)
- Lowest elevation: 71 m (233 ft)
- Population (2023): 316
  - Density: 39.7/km^{2} (103/sq mi)
- Time zone: UTC+01:00 (CET)
  - Summer (DST): UTC+02:00 (CEST)
- INSEE/Postal code: 08064 /08300
- ^{1} French Land Register data, which excludes lakes, ponds, glaciers > 1 km^{2} (0.386 sq mi or 247 acres) and river estuaries.

Biermes (French pronunciation: [bjɛʁm]) is a commune in the Ardennes department in northern France.

== Population ==
Historical population
Year	Pop.	±% p.a.
1968	195	—
1975	254	+3.85%
1982	272	+0.98%
1990	272	+0.00%
1999	246	−1.11%
2007	253	+0.35%
2012	281	+2.12%
2017	307	+1.79%
2023	316	+0.48%
Source: INSEE

== See also ==
- Communes of the Ardennes department
