= Sebastiano Vassalli =

Italian writer, novelist and literary critic

- Born: 24 October 1941; Genoa, Italy
- Died: 26 July 2015 (aged 73); Casale Monferrato, Italy
- Children: 1
- Writing career
- Genre: Periodic history
- Notable awards: Strega Prize
- Literary movement: Neoavanguardia

Sebastiano Vassalli (24 October 1941 – 26 July 2015) was an Italian author. He wrote the 2007 novel The Italian (L'italiano).

Vassalli was born in Genoa, Italy in 1941. His mother was from Tuscany and his father was from Lombardy. At a very young age, he was abandoned to relatives in Novara for some flour and oil. He went on to complete his Bachelor of arts degree in Milan. Soon after, Vassalli partnered with Cesare Musatti and wrote a book on Psychoanalysis and Contemporary Art which ultimately began his career as a notable author.

Vassalli devoted himself to teaching and researching artistic Neoavanguardia and was also involved with the Gruppo 63. He was a very dedicated man especially when it came to writing. He wrote for La Repubblica, La Stampa and Corriere della Sera.

Vassalli's works are established based on historical research relating to the evolution of religion, politics, and gender differences. His novels are normally set in a certain historical context (Italy in the sixties, the Middle Ages, and times of counter-fascism). He devotes his works to realistic representations of characters.

Vassalli's works are known for their ability to represent the extremely simple yet effective nature of the characters of the novels in a sort of fictional manner. This aspect, together with historical accuracy gives Vassalli’s works valuable qualities in terms of teaching them.

== Literary works ==
- Narcisso. 1968.
- Tempo di màssacro. 1970.
- Il millennio che muore. 1972.
- A.A. Il libro dell'utopia ceramica. 1974.
- L'arrivo della lozione. 1976.
- Abitare il vento. 1980.
- Mareblù. 1982.
- La notte della cometa. Il romanzo di Dino Campana [The Night of the Comet]. 1984.
- Sangue e suolo. 1985.
- L'alcova elettrica. 1986.
- L'oro del mondo. 1987.
- La chimera [The Chimera]. 1990.
- Marco e Mattio. 1992.
- Il Cigno. 1993.
- 3012. L'anno del profetaNarcisso. 1995.
- Cuore di pietra. 1996.
- Un infinito numero. 1998.
- Archeologia del presente. 2001.
- Dux. Casanova in Boemia 2003
- Stella avvelenata. 2005.

== Other works ==
- La morte di Marx e altri racconti, 2007.
- Un nulla pieno di storie. 2010.
