= Nanteuil-sur-Aisne =

- Commune
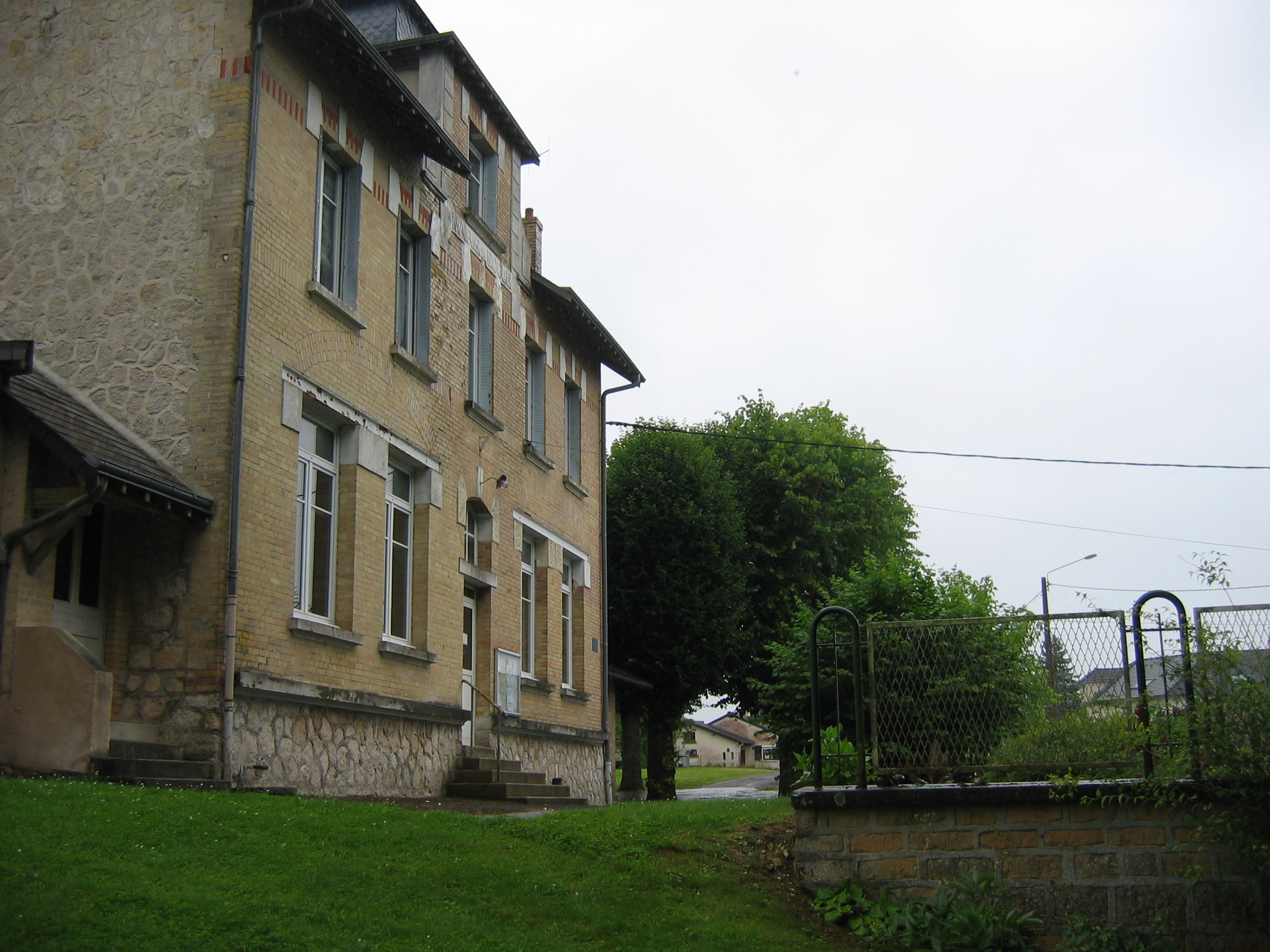
- The town hall in Nanteuil-sur-Aisne
- Location of Nanteuil-sur-Aisne
- Location within France Location within Grand Est
- Coordinates: 49°30′46″N 4°18′03″E
- Country: France
- Region: Grand Est
- Department: Ardennes
- Arrondissement: Rethel
- Canton: Rethel

Government
  - Mayor (2020–2026): Marie-Odile Andrieux
- Area^{1}: 7.92 km^{2} (3.06 sq mi)
- Elevation: 77 m (253 ft)
- Population (2023): 150
  - Density: 19/km^{2} (49/sq mi)
- Time zone: UTC+01:00 (CET)
  - Summer (DST): UTC+02:00 (CEST)
- INSEE/Postal code: 08313 /08300
- ^{1} French Land Register data, which excludes lakes, ponds, glaciers > 1 km^{2} (0.386 sq mi or 247 acres) and river estuaries.

Nanteuil-sur-Aisne (French pronunciation: [nɑ̃tœj syʁ ɛn], literally Nanteuil on Aisne) is a commune in the Ardennes department in northern France.

== Population ==
Historical population
Year	Pop.	±% p.a.
1968	129	—
1975	126	−0.34%
1982	133	+0.78%
1990	132	−0.09%
1999	125	−0.60%
2007	124	−0.10%
2012	115	−1.50%
2017	135	+3.26%
2023	150	+1.77%
Source: INSEE

== See also ==
- Communes of the Ardennes department
