= Arnicourt =

- Commune
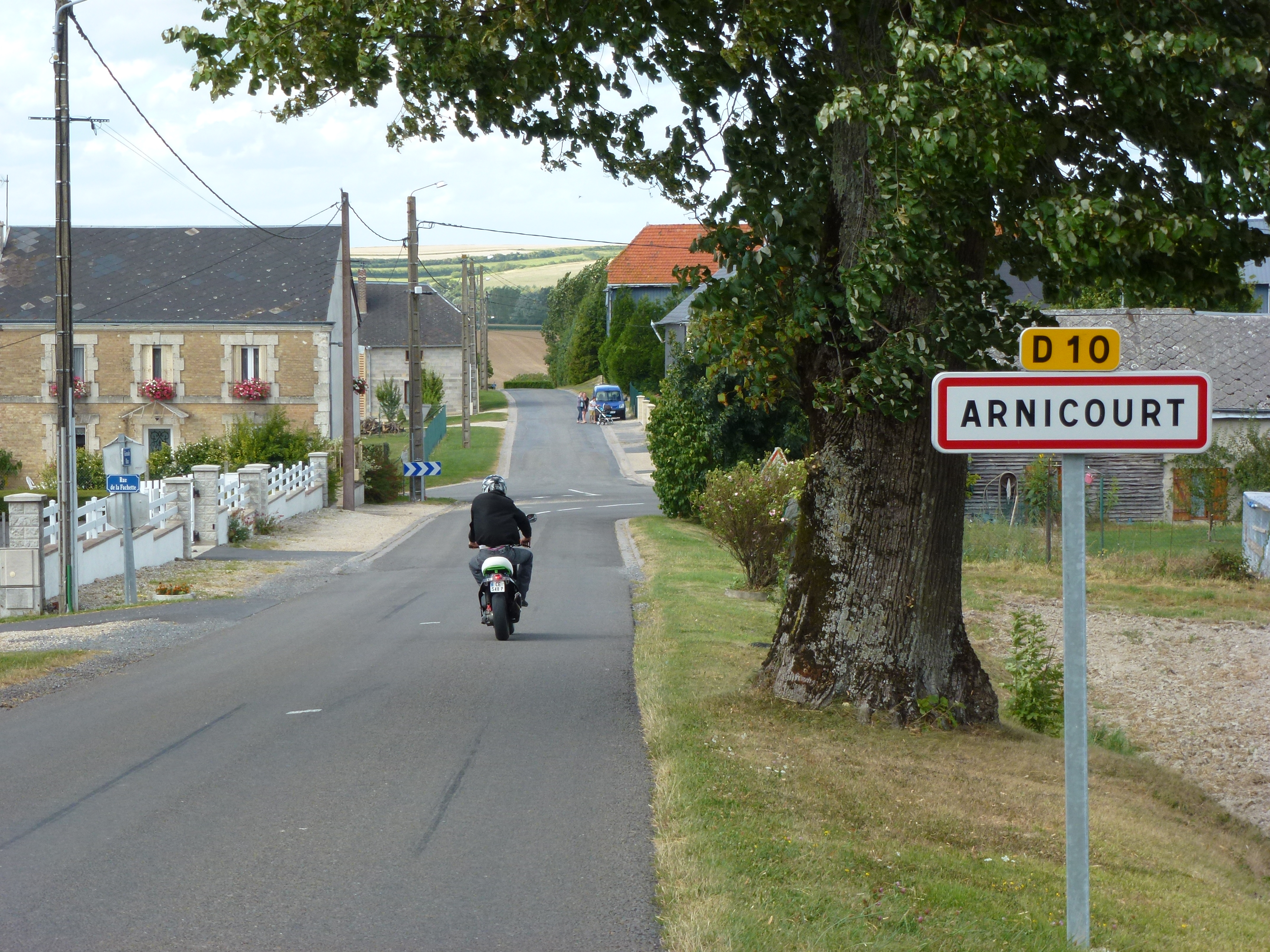
- Entrance to the village
- Location of Arnicourt
- Location within France Location within Grand Est
- Coordinates: 49°33′20″N 4°21′00″E
- Country: France
- Region: Grand Est
- Department: Ardennes
- Arrondissement: Rethel
- Canton: Rethel
- Intercommunality: CC Pays Rethélois

Government
  - Mayor (2020–2026): Thomas Samyn
- Area^{1}: 8.33 km^{2} (3.22 sq mi)
- Elevation: 106 m (348 ft)
- Highest elevation: 147 m (482 ft)
- Lowest elevation: 72 m (236 ft)
- Population (2023): 148
  - Density: 17.8/km^{2} (46.0/sq mi)
- Time zone: UTC+01:00 (CET)
  - Summer (DST): UTC+02:00 (CEST)
- INSEE/Postal code: 08021 /08300
- ^{1} French Land Register data, which excludes lakes, ponds, glaciers > 1 km^{2} (0.386 sq mi or 247 acres) and river estuaries.

Arnicourt (French pronunciation: [aʁnikuʁ]) is a commune in the Ardennes department in the Grand Est region of northern France.

== Geography ==
Arnicourt is located some 6 km north by north-west of Rethel and 8 km south-west of Novion-Porcien. Access to the commune is by the D10 road from Sorbon in the south passing through the commune and the village continuing to Sery in the north. The commune is entirely farmland with a small patch of forest in the north.

The Plumion river flows through the north of the commune from north to south-west joining the Rayee on the south-western border. The Rayee continues south-west forming a small part of the south-western border.

== Administration ==
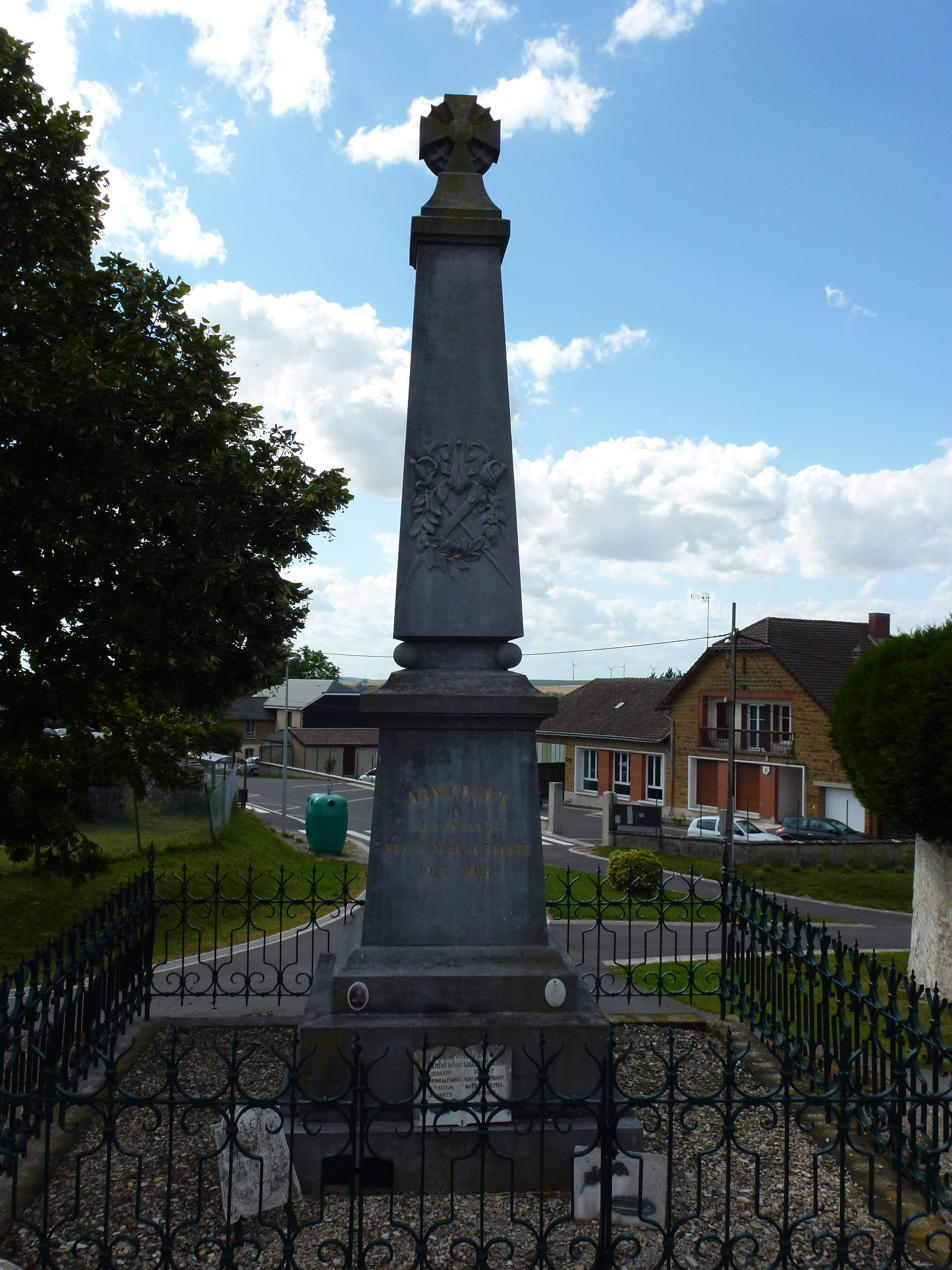
War Memorial

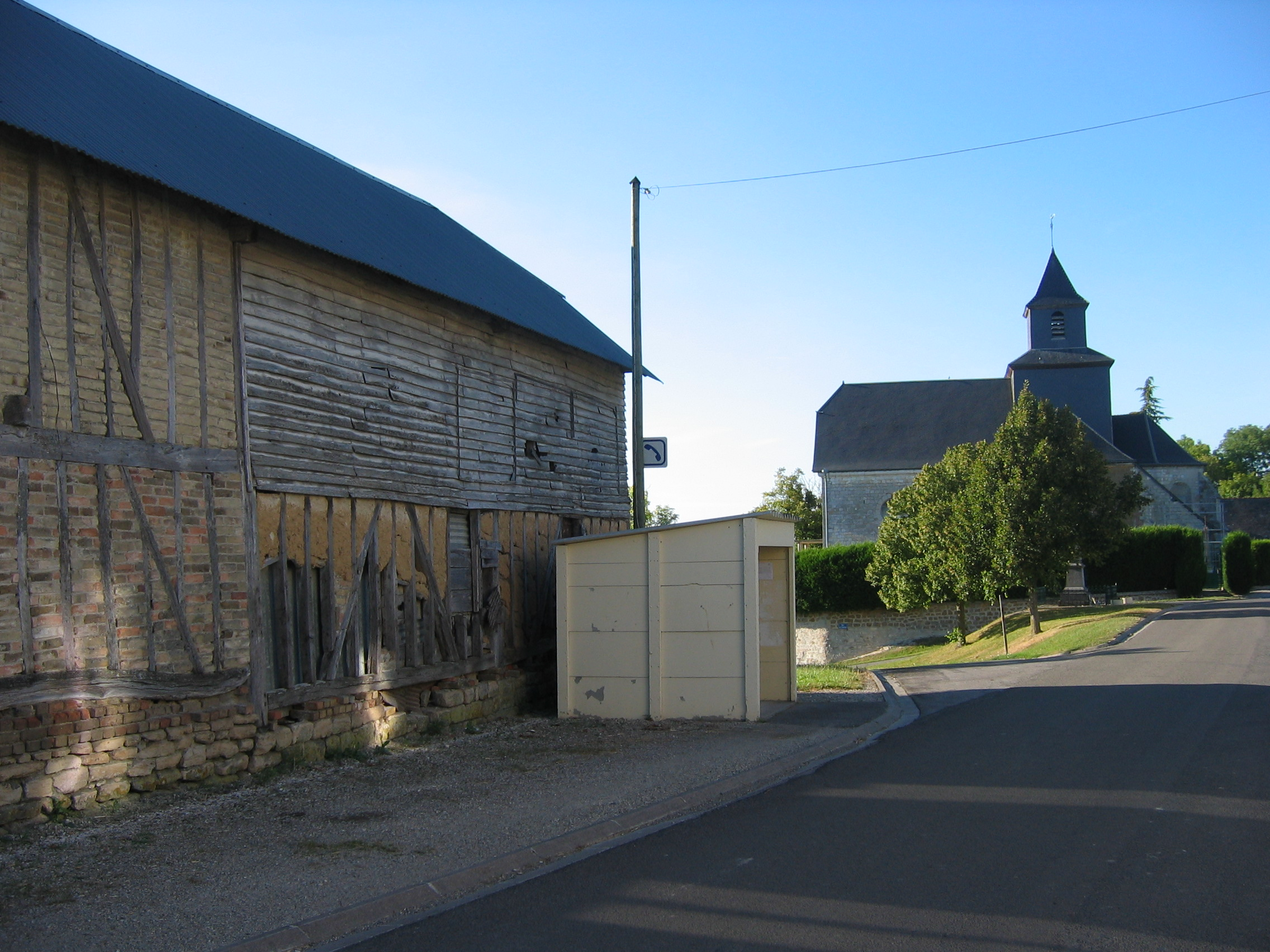
Rue Arnicourt

List of Successive Mayors

| From | To | Name |
|---|---|---|
| 2001 | 2020 | Alain Samyn |
| 2020 | current | Thomas Samyn |

== Demography ==
Historical population

| Year | Pop. | ±% p.a. |
|---|---|---|
| 1793 | 365 | — |
| 1821 | 390 | +0.24% |
| 1846 | 418 | +0.28% |
| 1872 | 400 | −0.17% |
| 1901 | 279 | −1.23% |
| 1921 | 159 | −2.77% |
| 1936 | 156 | −0.13% |
| 1946 | 99 | −4.45% |
| 1954 | 138 | +4.24% |
| 1962 | 119 | −1.83% |

| Year | Pop. | ±% p.a. |
|---|---|---|
| 1968 | 111 | −1.15% |
| 1975 | 101 | −1.34% |
| 1982 | 107 | +0.83% |
| 1990 | 130 | +2.46% |
| 1999 | 139 | +0.75% |
| 2007 | 154 | +1.29% |
| 2012 | 166 | +1.51% |
| 2017 | 157 | −1.11% |
| 2023 | 148 | −0.98% |

Source: EHESS and INSEE

== Sites and monuments ==
- The Church of Saint-Médard.
- The Chateau of Arnicourt (18th century) is registered as an historical monument.
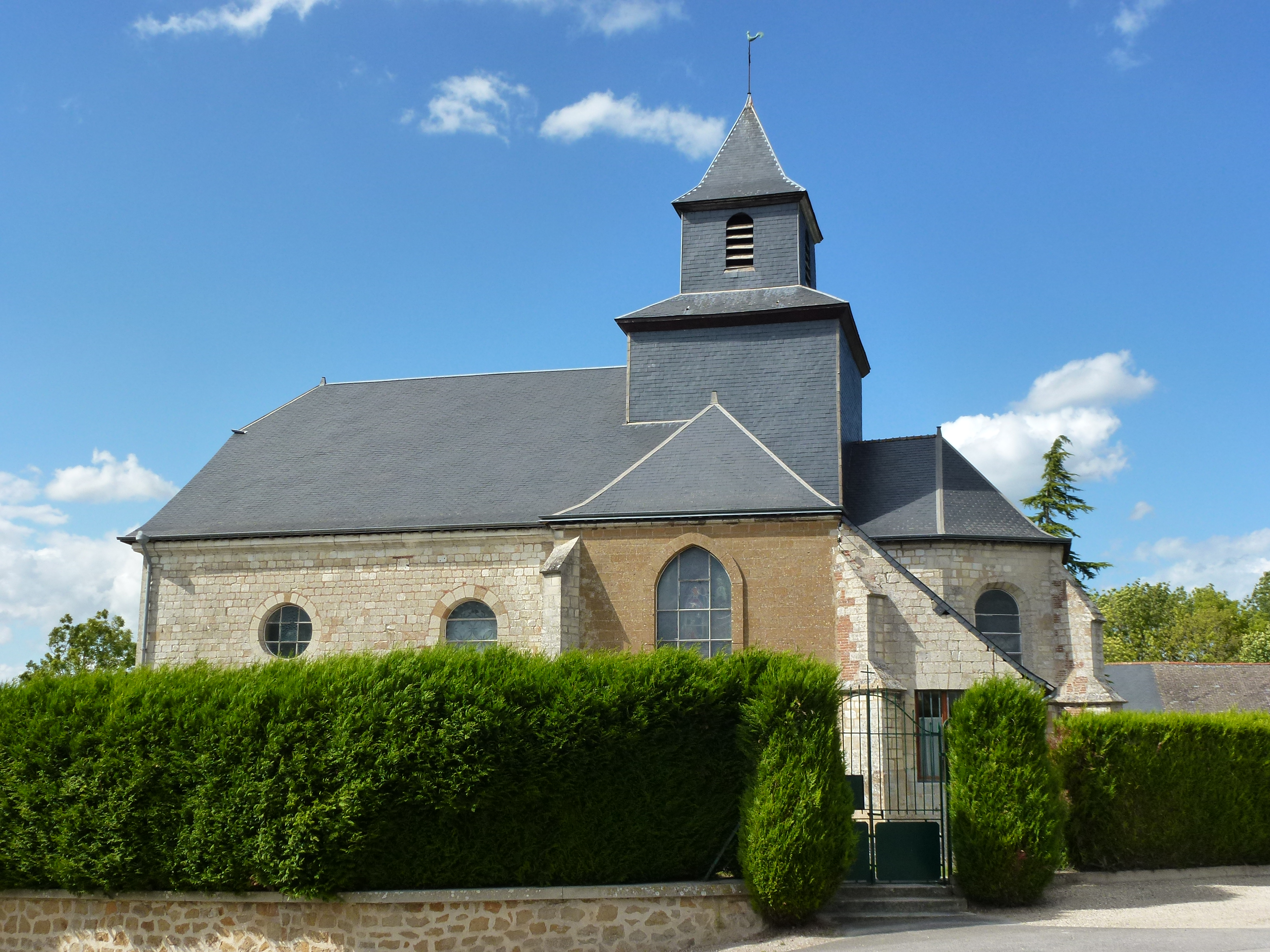
Church of Saint-Médard

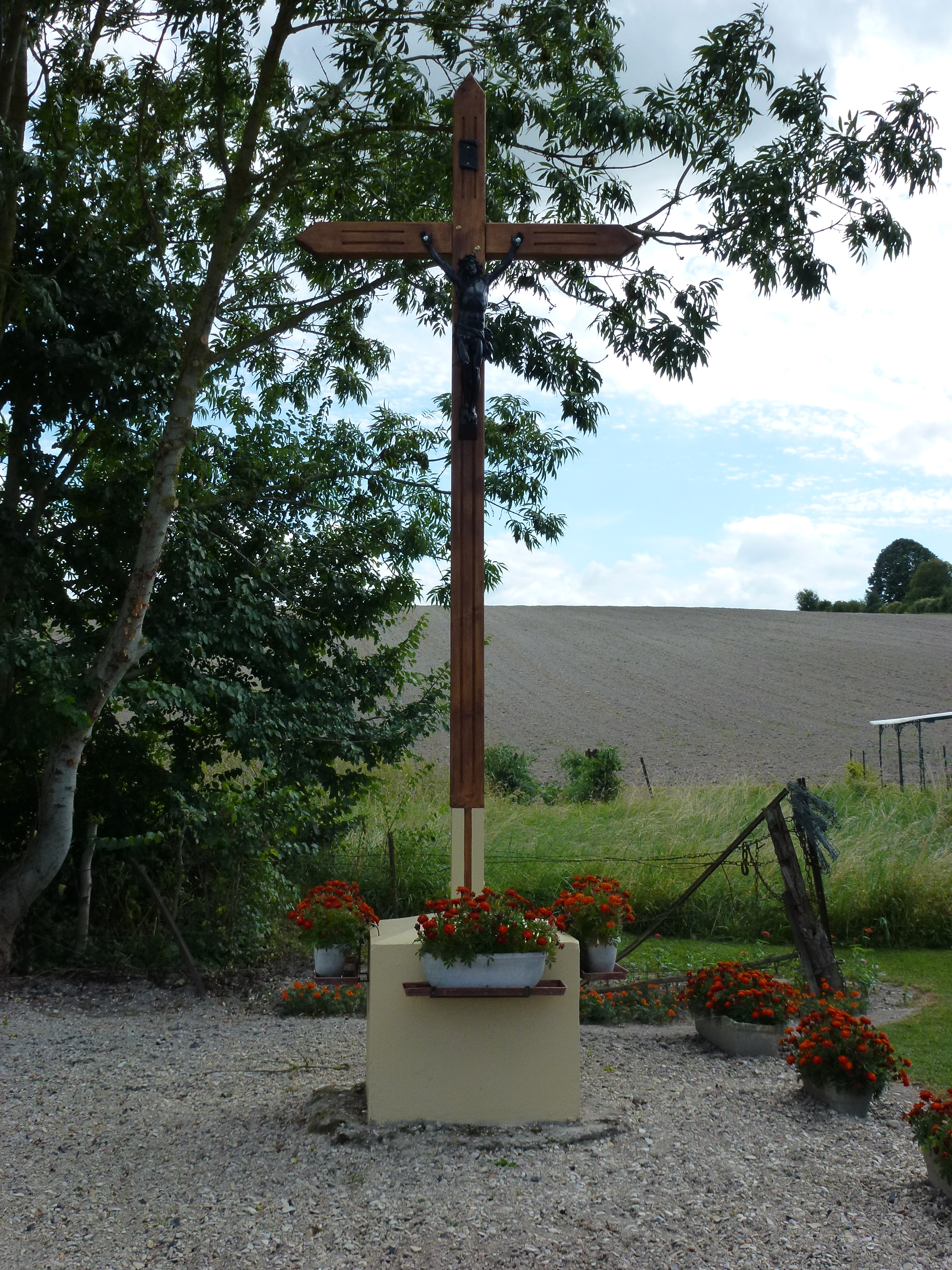
Cross

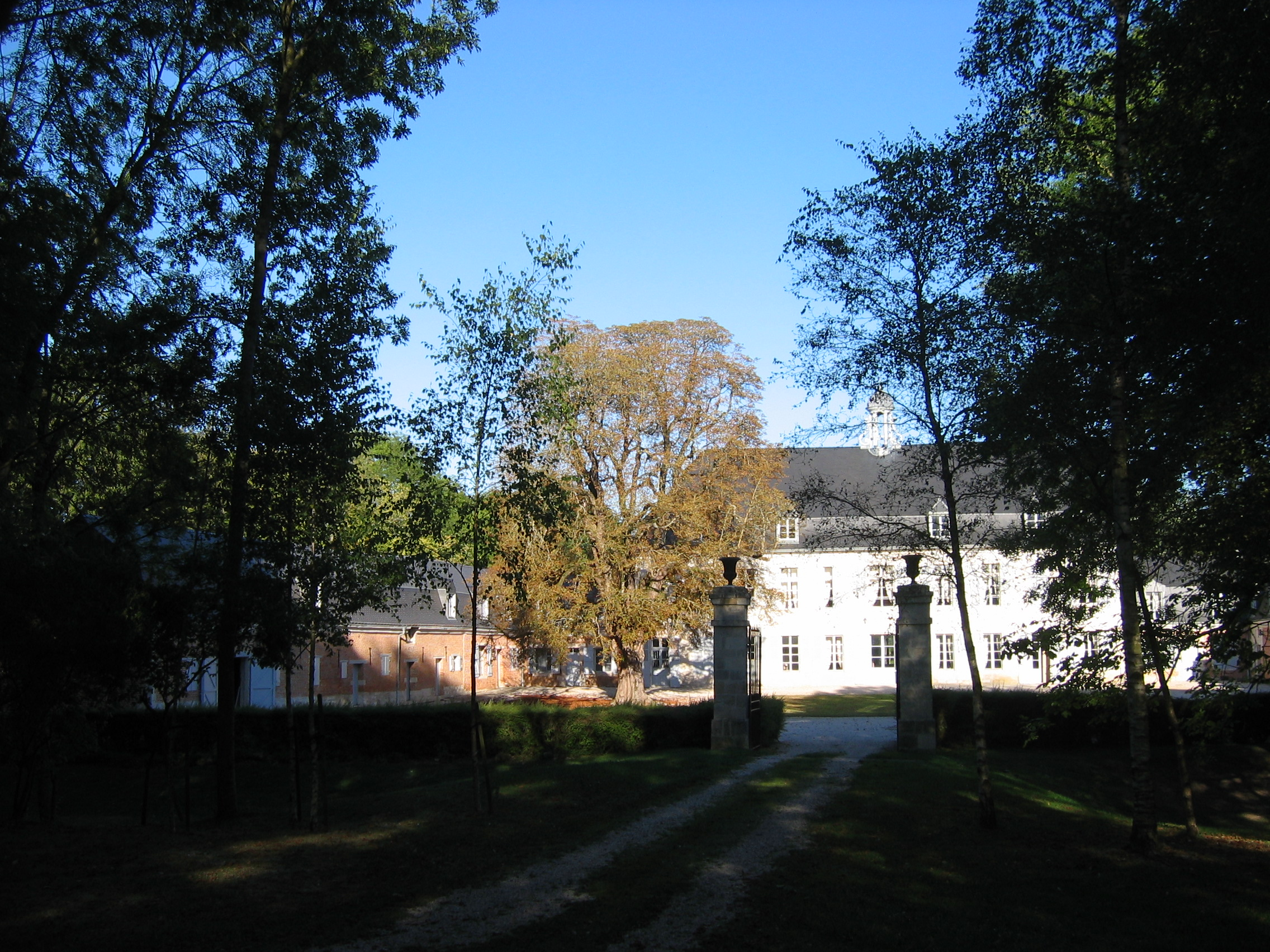
Chateau of Arnicourt

== Notable people linked to the commune ==
- Gérard Darrieu (1925–2004), actor.

== See also ==
- Communes of the Ardennes department
