= Seuil =

- Commune
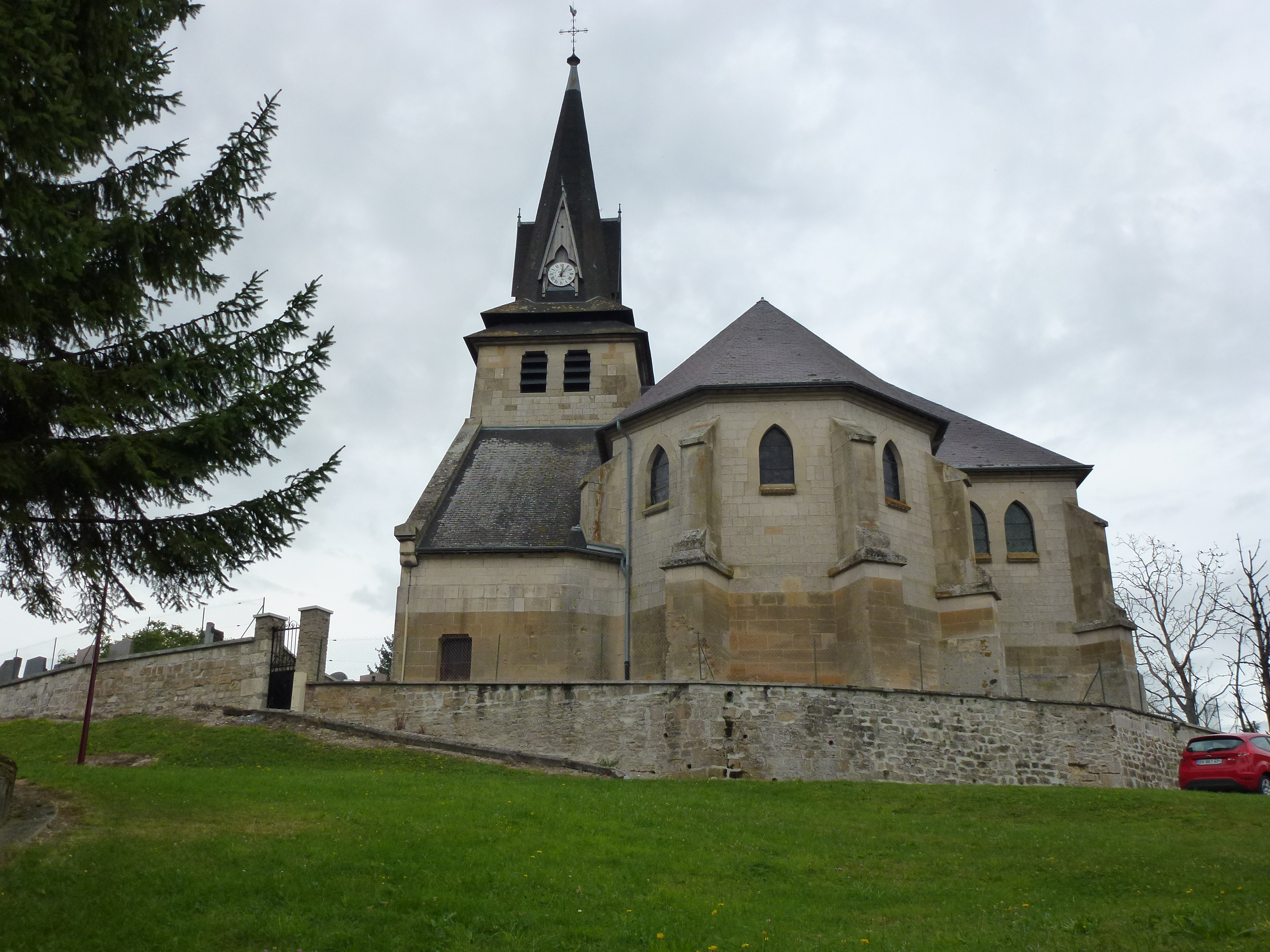
- The church in Seuil
- Location of Seuil
- Location within France Location within Grand Est
- Coordinates: 49°28′54″N 4°27′14″E
- Country: France
- Region: Grand Est
- Department: Ardennes
- Arrondissement: Rethel
- Canton: Rethel

Government
  - Mayor (2020–2026): Denis Aubert
- Area^{1}: 11.79 km^{2} (4.55 sq mi)
- Elevation: 125 m (410 ft)
- Population (2023): 185
  - Density: 15.7/km^{2} (40.6/sq mi)
- Time zone: UTC+01:00 (CET)
  - Summer (DST): UTC+02:00 (CEST)
- INSEE/Postal code: 08416 /08300
- ^{1} French Land Register data, which excludes lakes, ponds, glaciers > 1 km^{2} (0.386 sq mi or 247 acres) and river estuaries.

Seuil (French pronunciation: [sœj]) is a commune in the Ardennes department in northern France.

== Population ==
Historical population
Year	Pop.	±% p.a.
1968	220	—
1975	181	−2.75%
1982	172	−0.73%
1990	158	−1.06%
1999	166	+0.55%
2007	164	−0.15%
2012	148	−2.03%
2017	158	+1.32%
2023	185	+2.66%
Source: INSEE

== See also ==
- Communes of the Ardennes department
