= Mont-Laurent =

- Commune
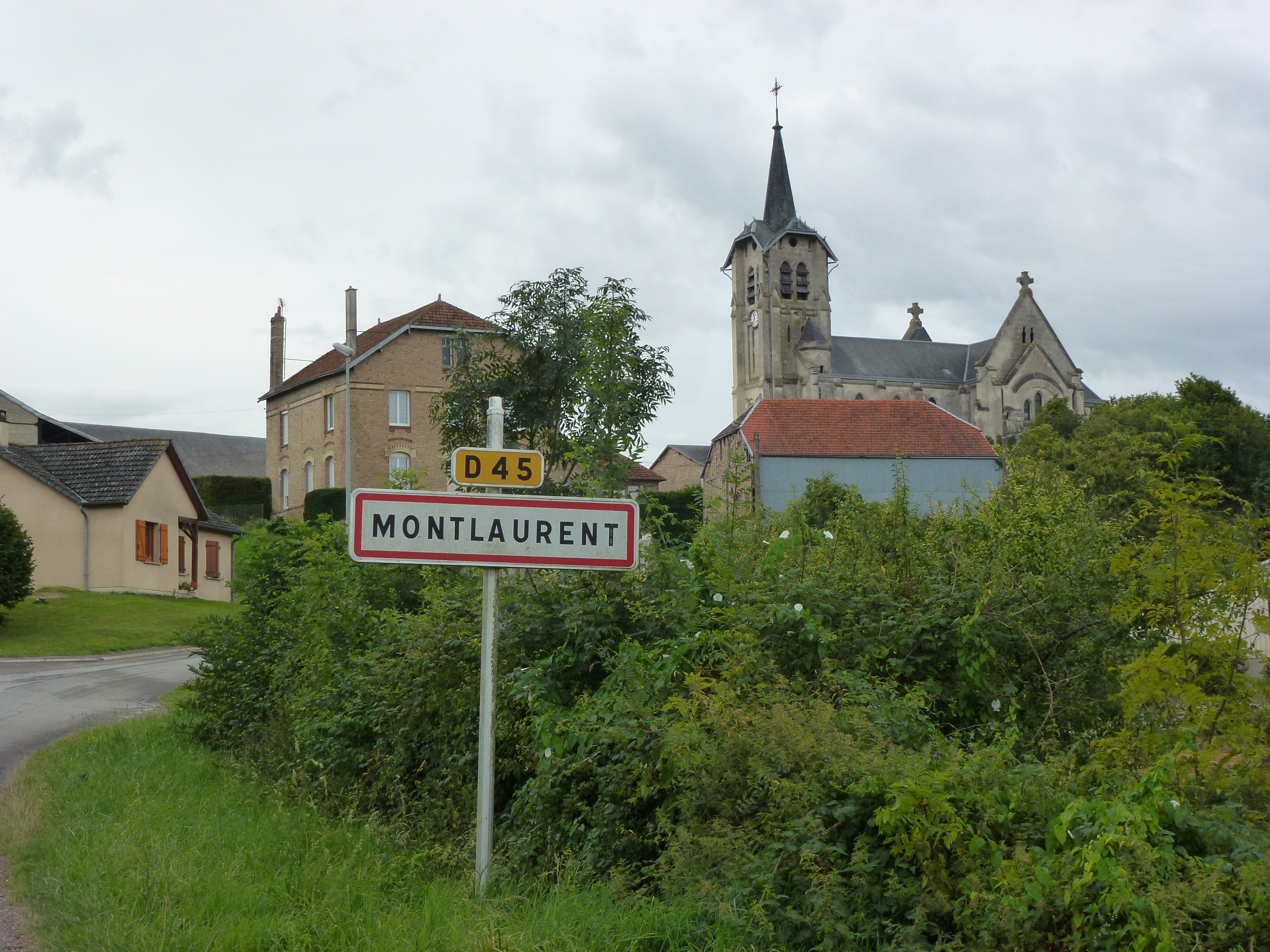
- The church in Mont-Laurent
- Location of Mont-Laurent
- Location within France Location within Grand Est
- Coordinates: 49°28′15″N 4°28′53″E
- Country: France
- Region: Grand Est
- Department: Ardennes
- Arrondissement: Rethel
- Canton: Rethel

Government
  - Mayor (2020–2026): Christian Mathy
- Area^{1}: 6.83 km^{2} (2.64 sq mi)
- Elevation: 110 m (360 ft)
- Population (2023): 51
  - Density: 7.5/km^{2} (19/sq mi)
- Time zone: UTC+01:00 (CET)
  - Summer (DST): UTC+02:00 (CEST)
- INSEE/Postal code: 08306 /08130
- ^{1} French Land Register data, which excludes lakes, ponds, glaciers > 1 km^{2} (0.386 sq mi or 247 acres) and river estuaries.

Mont-Laurent (French pronunciation: [mɔ̃ loʁɑ̃]) is a commune in the Ardennes department in northern France. The chateau mont-laurent in the town was occupied by members of a religious cult known as “les enfant de dieux” or “the children of God” during the early nineties. They had between thirty and fifty members living there at different points.

== Population ==
Historical population
Year	Pop.	±% p.a.
1968	106	—
1975	93	−1.85%
1982	83	−1.61%
1990	79	−0.62%
1999	75	−0.58%
2007	71	−0.68%
2012	68	−0.86%
2017	62	−1.83%
2023	51	−3.20%
Source: INSEE

== See also ==
- Communes of the Ardennes department
