= Doux (surname) =

Doux is a French-language surname. "Doux" means meaning "sweet", "soft", "gentle" in French. Notable people with the surname include:

- Pierre Doux, founder of Groupe Doux, French food company
