= Dux (novel) =

Novel by Sebastiano Vassalli

- Author: Sebastiano Vassalli
- Original title: Dux. Casanova in Boemia
- Genre: biographical novel
- Set in: Dux, Bohemia
- Publisher: Giulio Einaudi editore
- Publication date: 2002
- Media type: print
- Pages: 58
- OCLC: 50535750

Dux. Casanova in Boemia is a 2002 Italian novel by the Italian writer Sebastiano Vassalli. It deals with Giacomo Casanova’s last years, spent in the castle of Dux under the protection of the count of Waldstein.

== Plot ==
A 60-year-old Giacomo Casanova moves in the castle of Dux, a little bohemian town, under the field of the count of Joseph-Charles Emmanuel of Waldestein. Here he spends his last years alternating the composition of his novels and the fights with the other coinhabitants of the castle: like the butler Feltkircher, the admin Stelzl, the courier Wiederholt and the beautiful Carolina.

This last great battle is fought within the walls of the castle, especially in the dining room, where his inability of speaking German prevent him to communicate with the others, making him feeling alone and left out. Besides Wiederholt and Feltkircher, his worst enemies, made fun of him by disfiguring his portrait. They use them as toilet paper and exposing them in the toilets of the castle.

Offended Casanova decides to write to the mother-countess Marie Anna Therese of Waldstein, who writes him nice and supportive things making him believe that she his friend but only because she needs his help in convincing his son, the count, to marry Marie Josepha Lobkowitz and to leave” the b.” Carolina. But when the countess meets him in person, during the imperial coronation of Leopold II, she is let down by his appearance and thinks that she should have never written to him in such a kindly and familiar way. At the end of the ceremony she decides to restore the order in the castle of his son.

As years pass by the situation for the old Casanova gets better. He finds a way to express his anger arguing with anyone: he writes 21 letters to his enemies in which he tells them everything he thinks about them.

On 4 June 1798 he dies finally in peace.
