= Doux, Ardennes =

Doux
- Commune
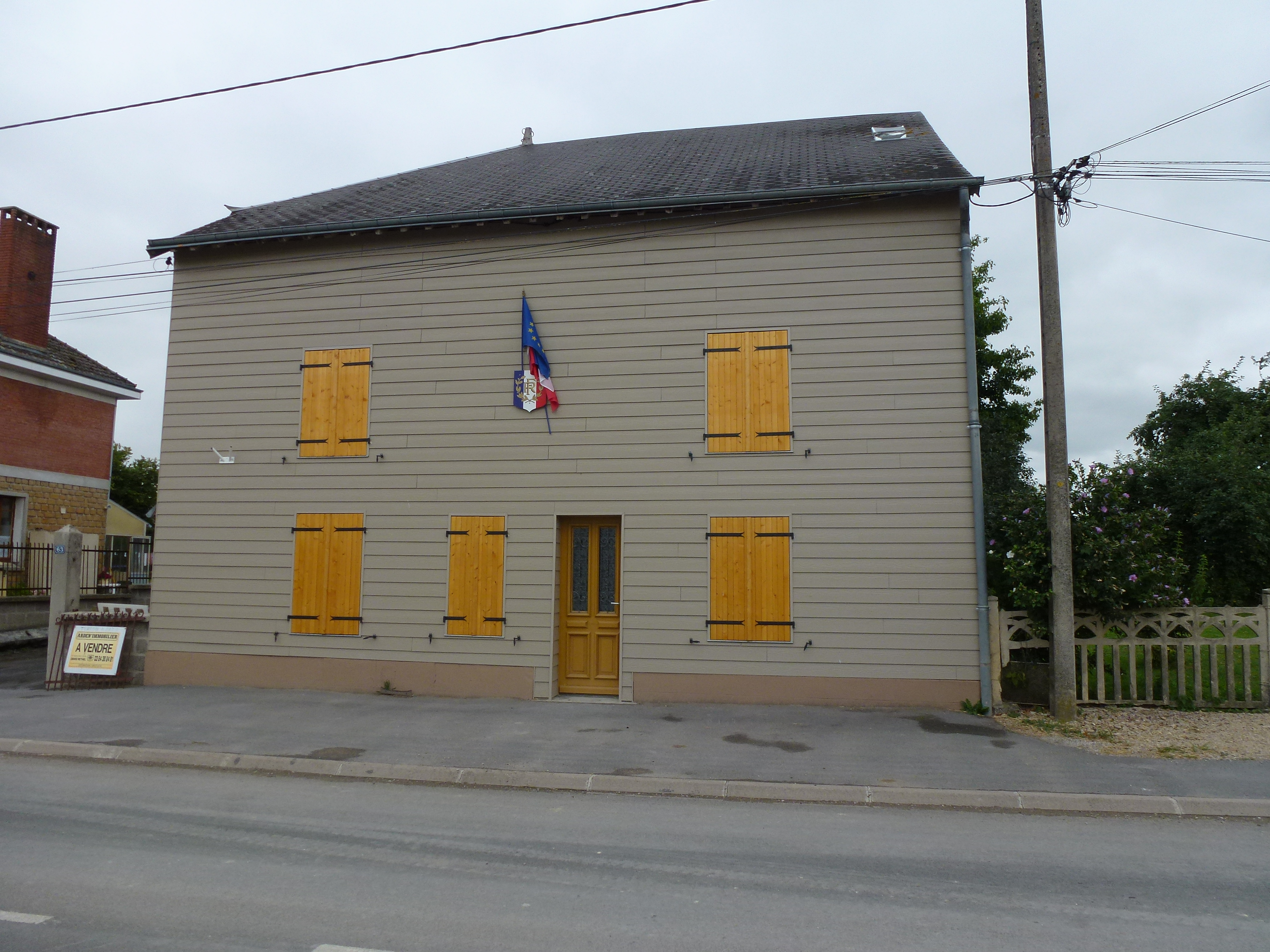
- The town hall in Doux

- Coat of arms
- Location of Doux
- Location within France Location within Grand Est
- Coordinates: 49°30′19″N 4°25′52″E
- Country: France
- Region: Grand Est
- Department: Ardennes
- Arrondissement: Rethel
- Canton: Rethel

Government
  - Mayor (2020–2026): René Debrosse
- Area^{1}: 6.52 km^{2} (2.52 sq mi)
- Elevation: 79 m (259 ft)
- Population (2023): 102
  - Density: 15.6/km^{2} (40.5/sq mi)
- Time zone: UTC+01:00 (CET)
  - Summer (DST): UTC+02:00 (CEST)
- INSEE/Postal code: 08144 /08300
- ^{1} French Land Register data, which excludes lakes, ponds, glaciers > 1 km^{2} (0.386 sq mi or 247 acres) and river estuaries.

Doux (French pronunciation: [du]) is a commune in the Ardennes department in northern France.

== Population ==
Historical population
Year	Pop.	±% p.a.
1968	71	—
1975	77	+1.17%
1982	78	+0.18%
1990	63	−2.63%
1999	76	+2.11%
2007	68	−1.38%
2012	69	+0.29%
2017	100	+7.70%
2023	102	+0.33%
Source: INSEE

== See also ==
- Communes of the Ardennes department
