= Authe =

- Commune
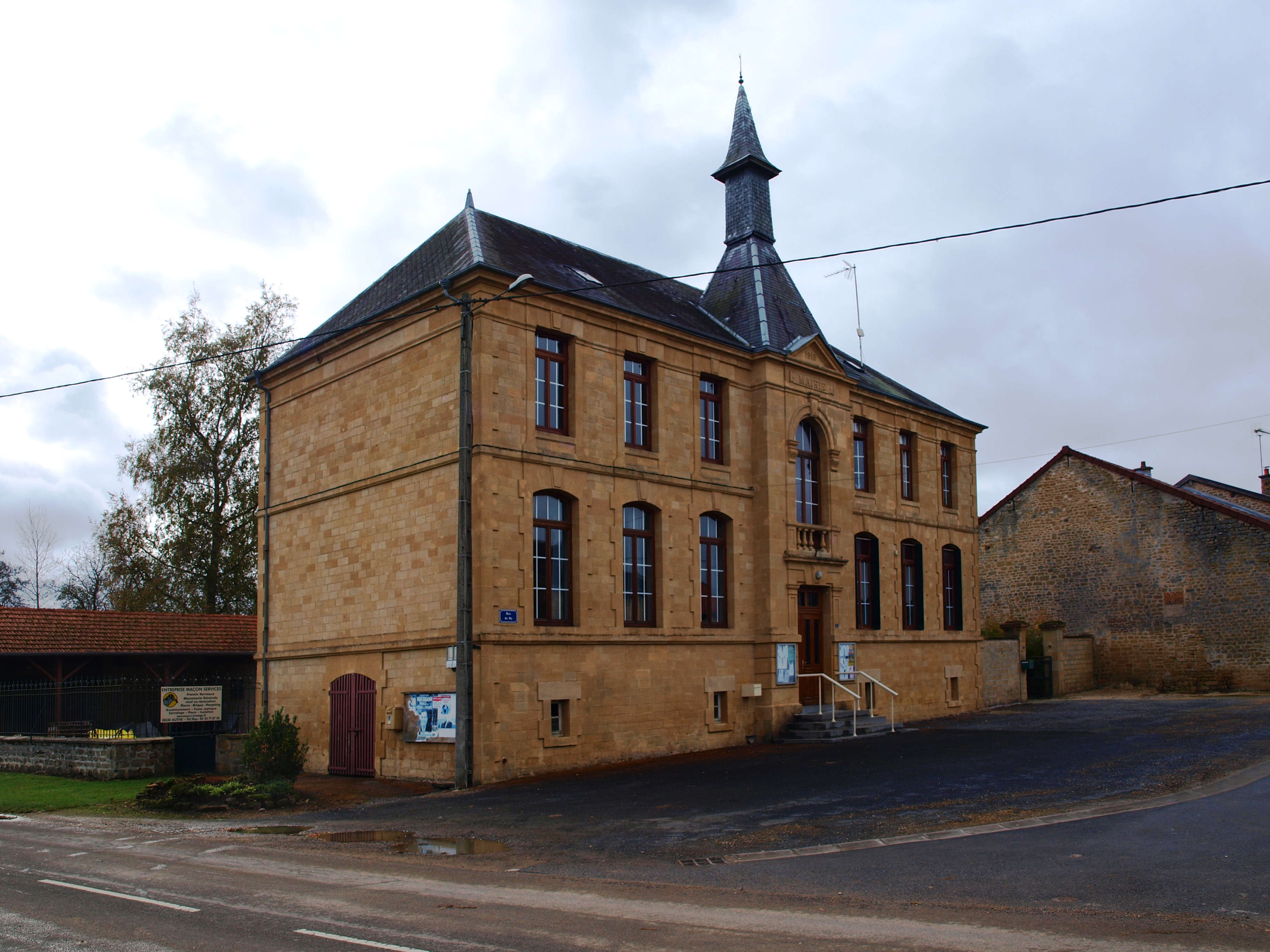
- Town hall

- Coat of arms
- Location of Authe
- Location within France Location within Grand Est
- Coordinates: 49°27′36″N 4°52′47″E
- Country: France
- Region: Grand Est
- Department: Ardennes
- Arrondissement: Vouziers
- Canton: Vouziers
- Intercommunality: CC Argonne Ardennaise

Government
  - Mayor (2020–2026): Sylvie Lefort
- Area^{1}: 9.47 km^{2} (3.66 sq mi)
- Elevation: 172 m (564 ft)
- Highest elevation: 225 m (738 ft)
- Lowest elevation: 164 m (538 ft)
- Population (2023): 94
  - Density: 9.9/km^{2} (26/sq mi)
- Time zone: UTC+01:00 (CET)
  - Summer (DST): UTC+02:00 (CEST)
- INSEE/Postal code: 08033 /08240
- ^{1} French Land Register data, which excludes lakes, ponds, glaciers > 1 km^{2} (0.386 sq mi or 247 acres) and river estuaries.

Authe (French pronunciation: [ot]) is a commune in the Ardennes department in the Grand Est region of northern France.

== Geography ==
Authe is located some 45 km east by south-east of Rethel and 20 km north-east of Vouziers. Access to the commune is by road D12 from Brieulles-sur-Bar in the north which passes through the centre of the commune and the village and continues south to join the D947 south of the commune. The commune consists entirely of farmland.

The Bar river forms the south-western border of the commune as it flows north-west to follow the Canal des Ardennes to join the Meuse near Vrigne-Meuse. The Ruisseau de Saint-Pierremont flows from the north-east of the commune past the village and joins the Bar on the south-western border of the commune.

=== Heraldry ===
Arms of Authe	Blazon: Party per pale Vert and Gules a wolf's head cabossed of Argent debruised by the division, in chief Sable charged with three fleurs-de-lis of Argent.

== Administration ==
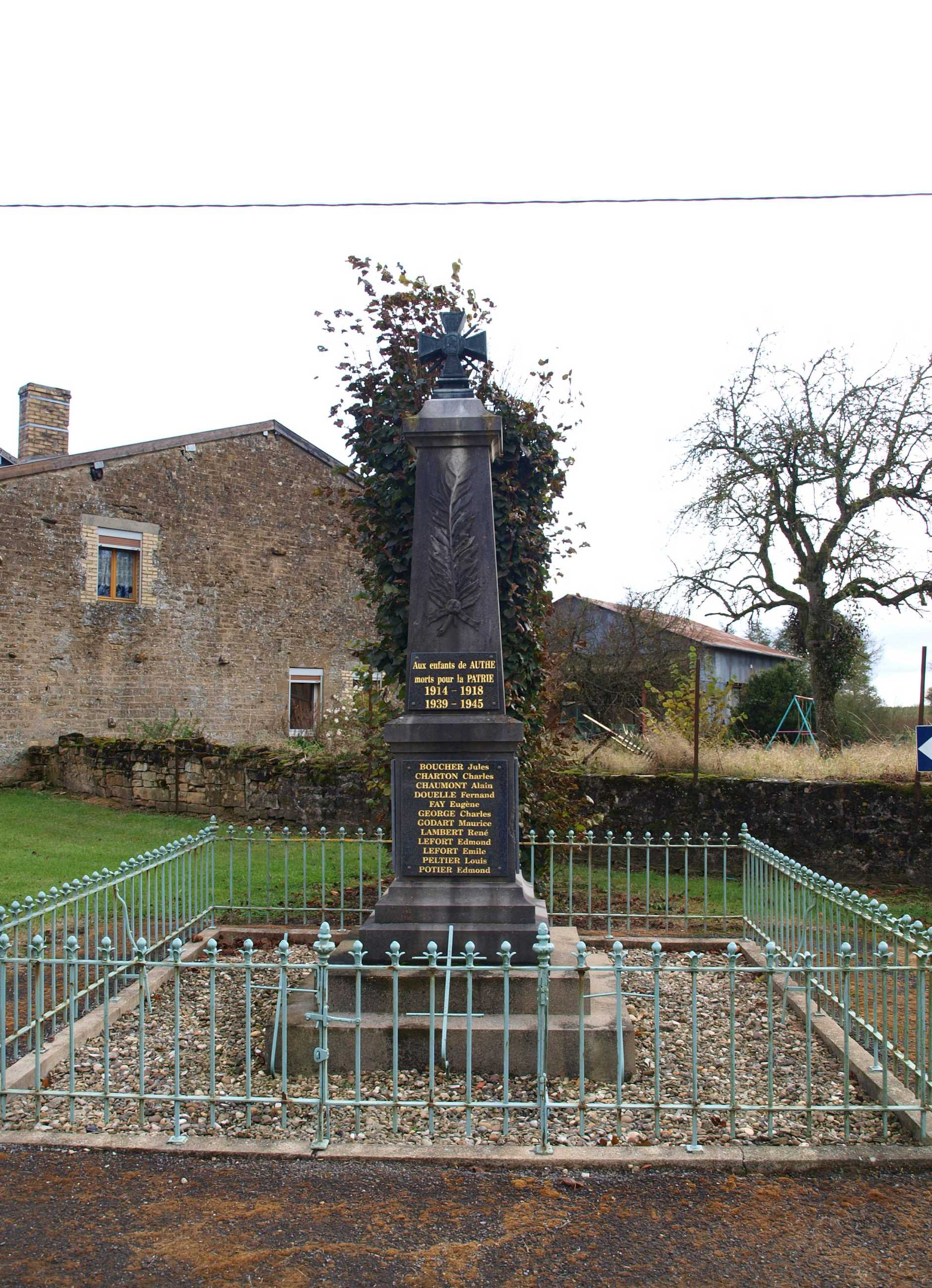
The War Memorial

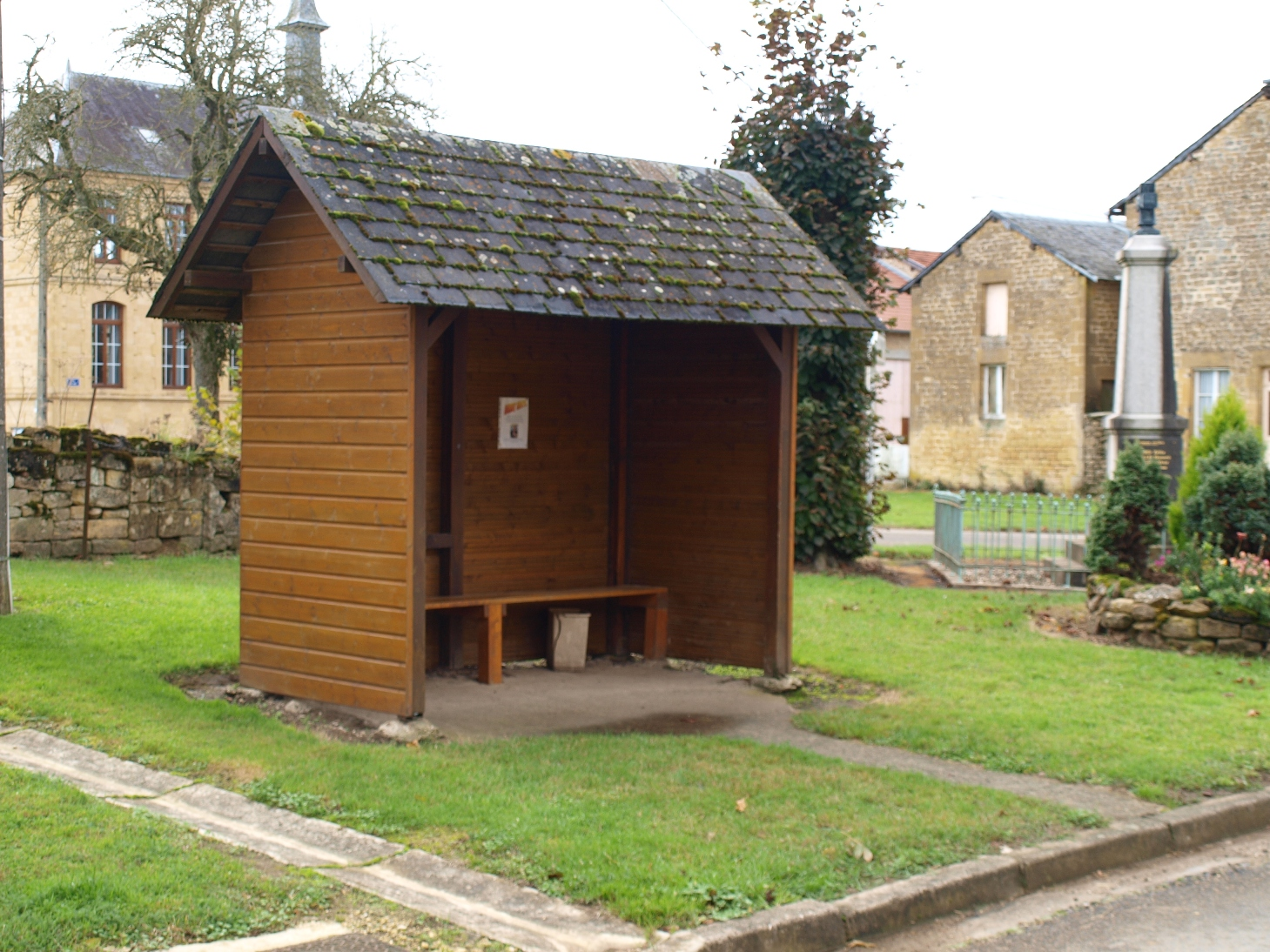
The Village bus stop

List of Successive Mayors

From	To	Name
2001	current	Sylvie Lefort

== Demography ==
The inhabitants of the commune are known as Authois or Authoises in French.

Historical population

Year	Pop.	±% p.a.
1793	336	—
1821	365	+0.30%
1846	394	+0.31%
1872	342	−0.54%
1901	334	−0.08%
1926	243	−1.26%
1946	164	−1.95%
1962	143	−0.85%
1968	125	−2.22%

Year	Pop.	±% p.a.
1975	96	−3.70%
1982	87	−1.40%
1990	83	−0.59%
1999	94	+1.39%
2007	93	−0.13%
2012	93	+0.00%
2017	90	−0.65%
2023	94	+0.73%

Source: EHESS and INSEE

== Culture and heritage ==
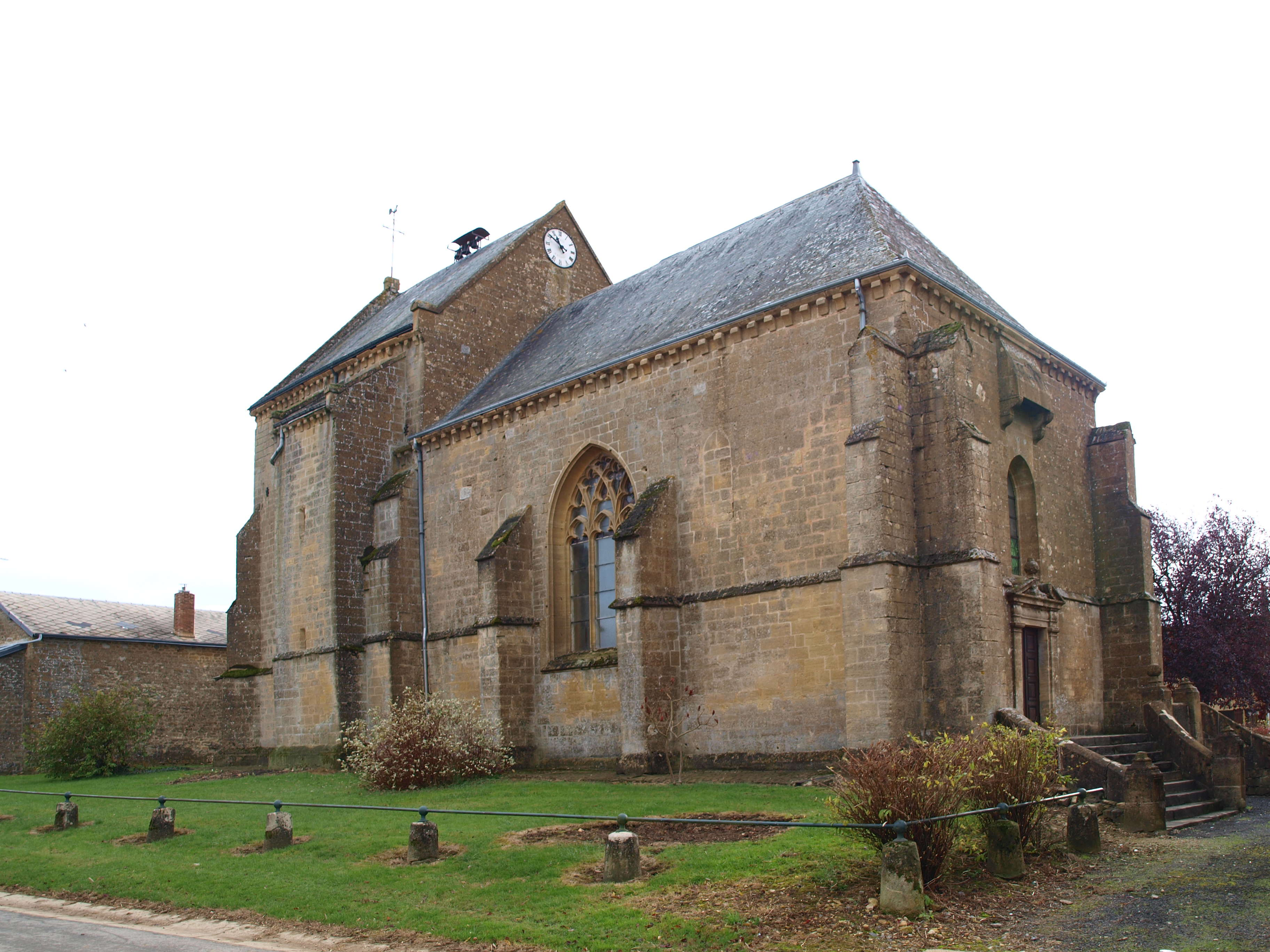
The Church of Saint-Martin

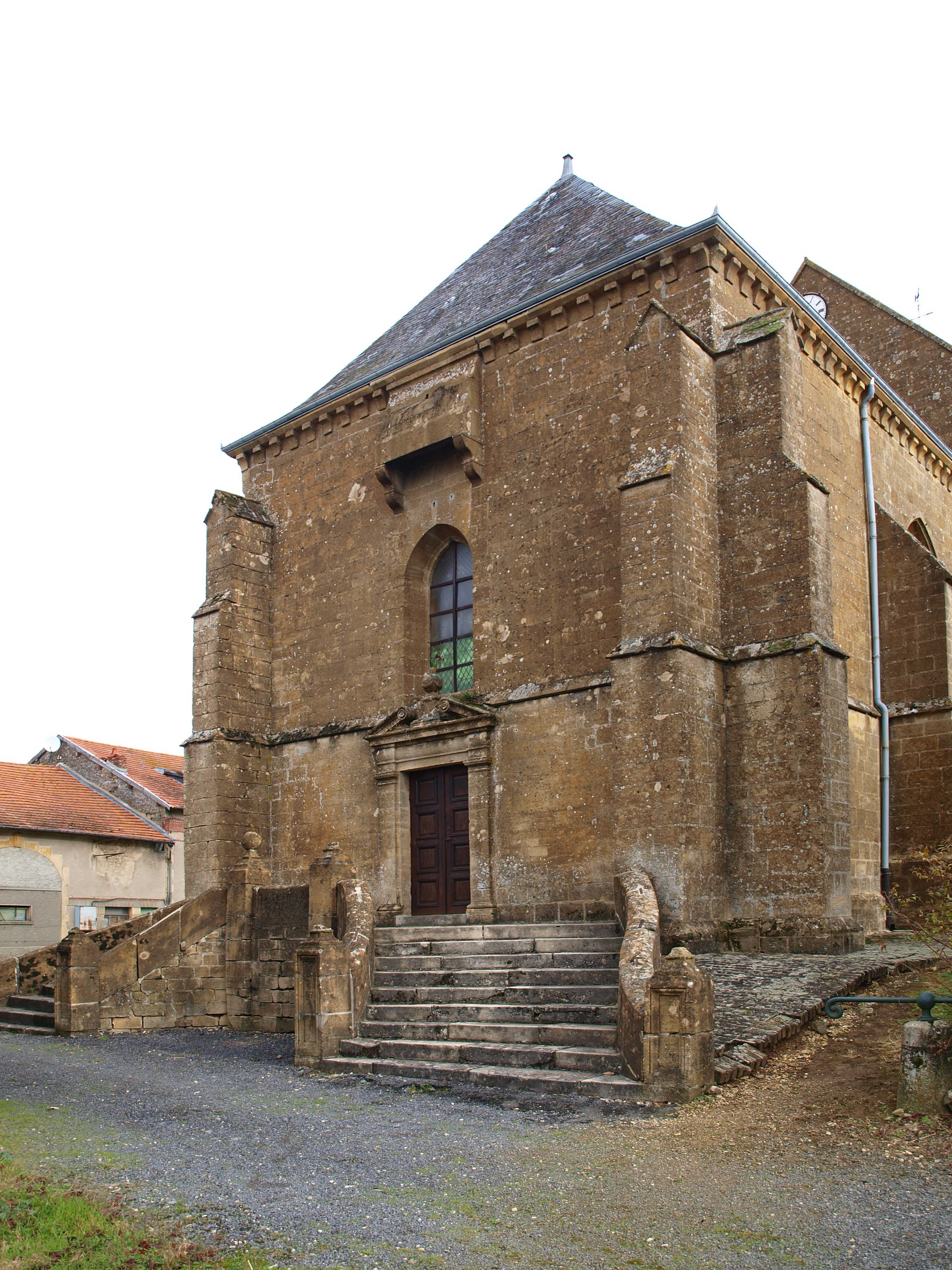
The entrance to the church

=== Religious heritage ===
The commune has one religious building registered as an historical monument:

- The Church of Saint-Martin (14th century)

== See also ==
- Communes of the Ardennes department
