= Battle of Vrigne-Meuse =

1918 battle in World War I

- Part of Meuse–Argonne offensive
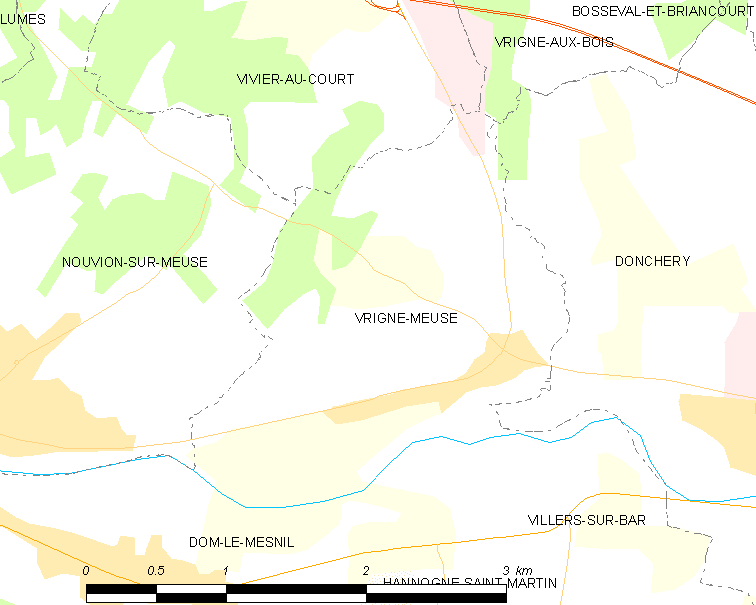
- Map of French communes: Vrigne-Meuse
Date	9 to 11 November 1918
Location	Vrigne-Meuse 49°42′22″N 4°50′0″E
Result	Armistice

Belligerents
German Empire	France
	Edmond Boichut

Strength
Unknown	700 soldiers

Casualties and losses
Unknown but high	99 dead and 190 injured

The Battle of Vrigne-Meuse was an attack led by the French infantry against German positions, between 9 and 11 November 1918 in the Ardennes. It was one of the last battles of the First World War, as it took place during the armistice negotiations in November 1918 Over 90 French soldiers were killed in the battle. Around 200 were injured.

== History ==
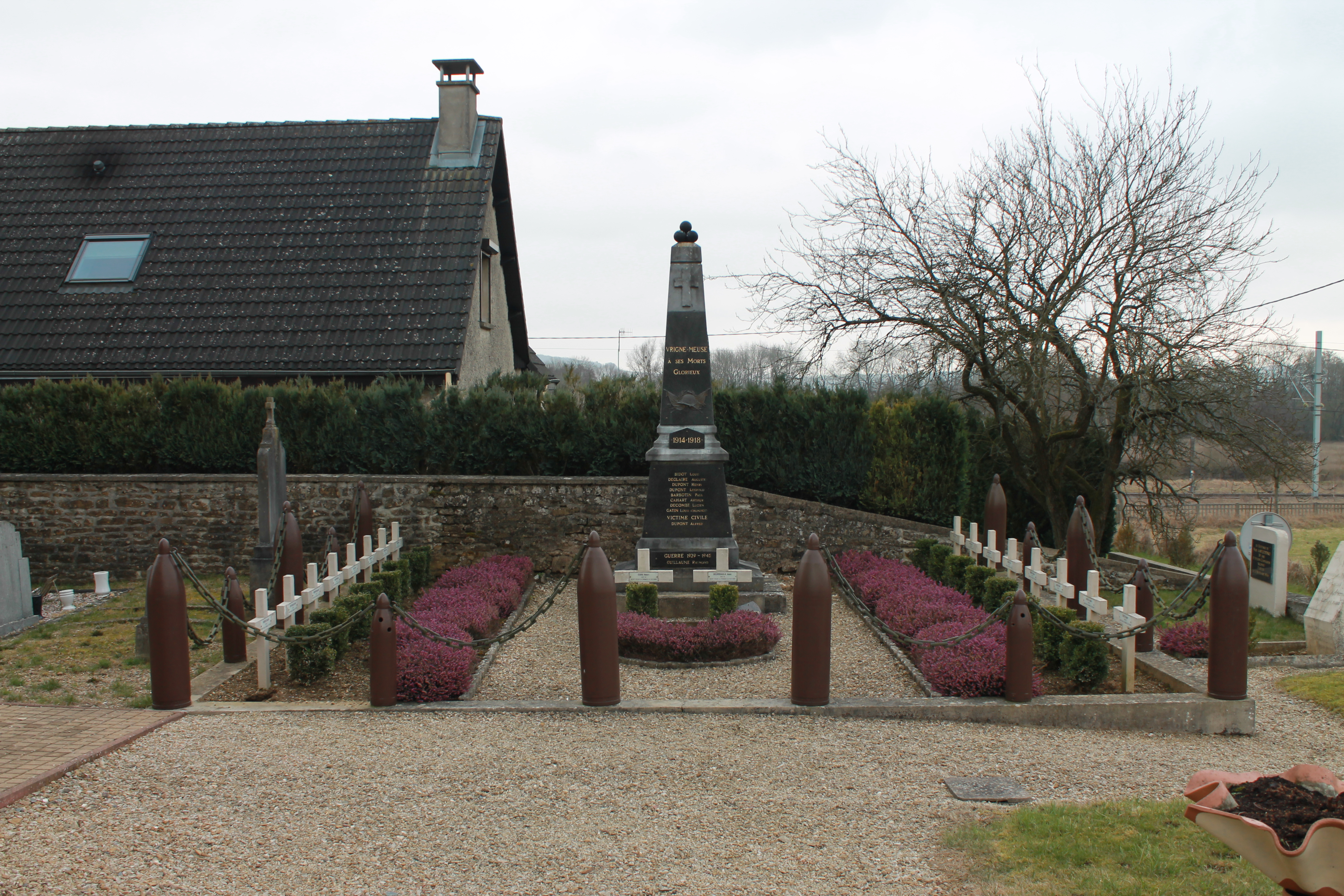
Graves of the last French people who fell on November 9, 10 and 11, 1918.

On 9 November 1918, the 415th Infantry Regiment (RI) attempted to cross the Meuse river between Dom-le-Mesnil and Vrigne-Meuse. Footbridges were installed by the divisional engineers. The next day, the three battalions of the 415th Infantry Regiment, with 700 men, were significantly outnumbered by German forces on the frontline.

On 11 November the fog lifted at 10:30am. The weather conditions were poor and the river had flooded making the operation of crossing difficult for the French soldiers. The courier (estafette), Augustin Trébuchon, carried a message to his captain. Trébuchon of the 415th Infantry Regiment was the last French soldier killed during World War I. Although he was the last to die, he was one of 91 in his regiment to pass that day. He was killed by machine gun fire at 10:45am, just before the 11 a.m. ceasefire while delivering a message along the Meuse River. (Note: On his civil status form at the town hall of Malzieu-Forain in Lozère the date is noted as 10 November 1918, because the military authorities chose to erase from memory the last battles of the morning of 11 November 1918.) His body was found by fellow soldiers Georges Gazareth, the liaison officer, and Octave Delaluque near Captain Lebreton’s command post.

According to the former mayor of Vrigne-Meuse Georges Dommelier, Trébuchon died between the dam footbridge and the front line, which was located along the railway line as he was going towards the front line troops, in front of Vrigne-Meuse. The note he was carrying read "we'll expect you at 11:30 a.m. in Dom-le-Mesnil for a snack".

Some historians have disputed the identity of the last fallen soldier. According to Belgian historian Jean-Emile Andreux, another soldier died five minutes before 11 a.m. from a German shell. According to Jean-Dominique Merchet, this could have been Jules Achille who was serving in the same regiment. According to historian Jean-Yves Le Naour, a number of soldiers' deaths on 11 November were deliberately registered under 10 November to avoid the admission that those soldiers had died on the same day of the armistice. Therefore the identity of the last French soldier killed in World War I was disputed.

The exact time of Trébuchon's death and the location of the place where he was killed was disputed, as the date of his death on his tombstone was 10 November instead of 11 November.

On 11 November 1918, bugler Octave Delaluque sounded the Armistice at Vrigne-Meuse. He was the only bugler to sound the armistice during combat. He was rescued from a shell hole under enemy fire and ordered by Captain Lebretton to signal the ceasefire, though he could not recall the call he learned years earlier. Earlier corporal Pierre Sellier, originally from the Territoire de Belfort, and whose bugle still rests in the Army Museum, sounded the ceasefire on the evening of 7 November, to allow the German plenipotentiaries to cross the French lines at La Flamengrie in the Aisne.

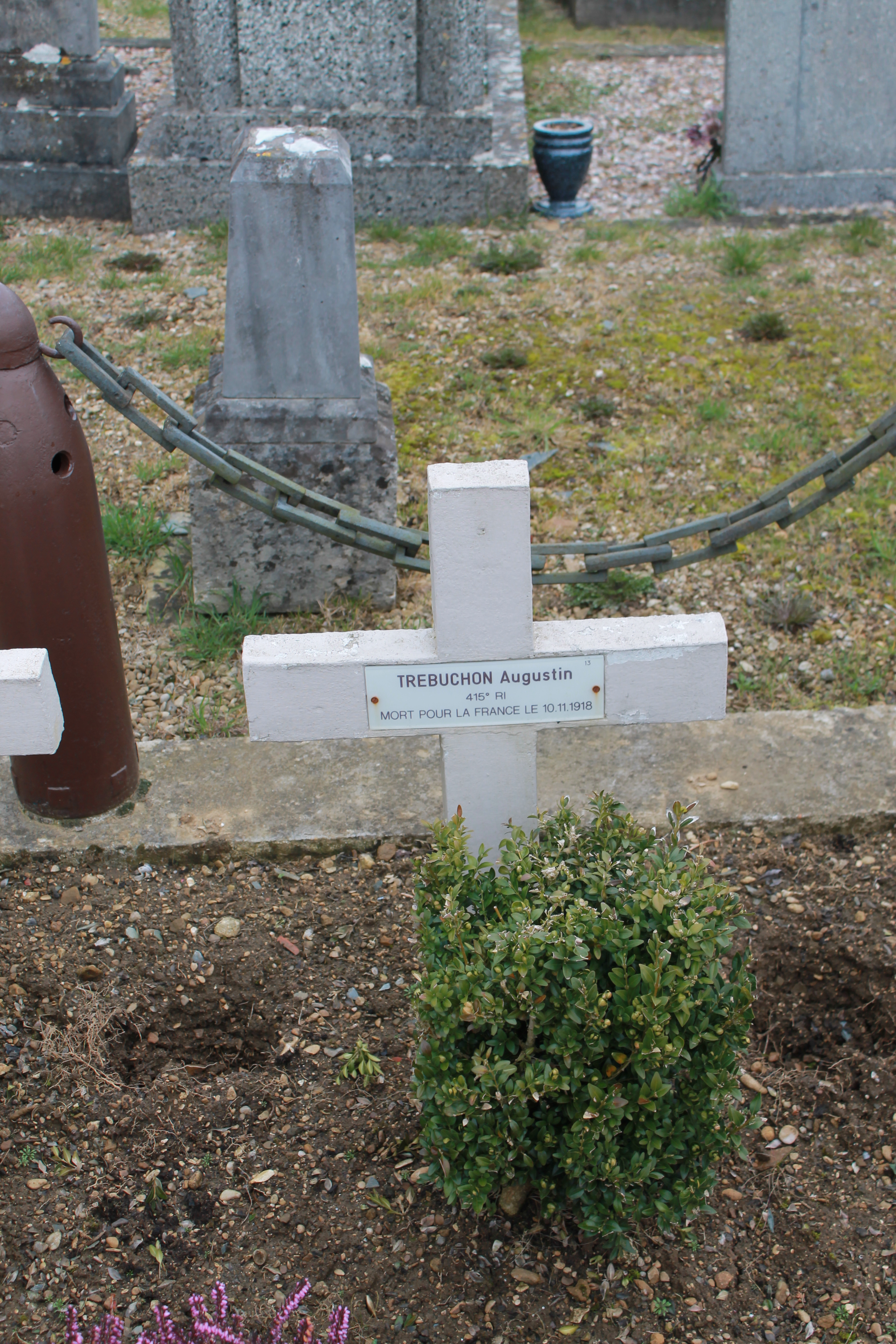
The grave of Augustin Trébuchon

Jean-Emile Andreux, who studied the log of the march and operations of the health service of the 415th regiment, discovered this sentence: "on 11/11 at 11:00 Armistice bell. The last shell was fired at 10:55 near the main aid station which was installed at Dom-le-Mesnil and had killed a man. The identity of the man remains unknown, but the name of Jules Achille is sometimes mentioned. Achille was born on 14 September 1893 at La Poôté in Mayenne and was missing in action.

According to historian René Richard, from the association "Bretagne 14-18", another theory exists which asserts that another soldier, identified as Auguste Joseph Renault (b. 6 December 1897), died a few minutes after Trébuchon at exactly 10:58a.m. The men of the 415th Infantry Regiment were not given time to bury their dead compatriots and their commander was sent to Lebanon and Syria. The 415th Infantry Regiment was not represented in the grand victory parade of 14 July 1919. Ten years later, in April 1929, a war memorial was unveiled at the site of the fighting, in the presence of veterans.

== Legacy ==
Every 11 November, the survivors of the battle and later their descendants gathered together in the village to commemorate the event. A street in Vrigne-Meuse bears the name of Augustin Trébuchon. Augustin became a national hero and a symbol for courage in France. Every year on Armistice Day, both Augustin and the French army's courage and heroism is praised. The battle was marked in 2018 for its centenary particularly the context of the armistice. The mayor of Vrigne-Meuse Jean-Christophe Chanot hailed his "great patriotic momentum".

== See also ==
- Second Battle of Mons, fought 9–11 November 1918
