= Aire, Ardennes =

Aire
- Commune
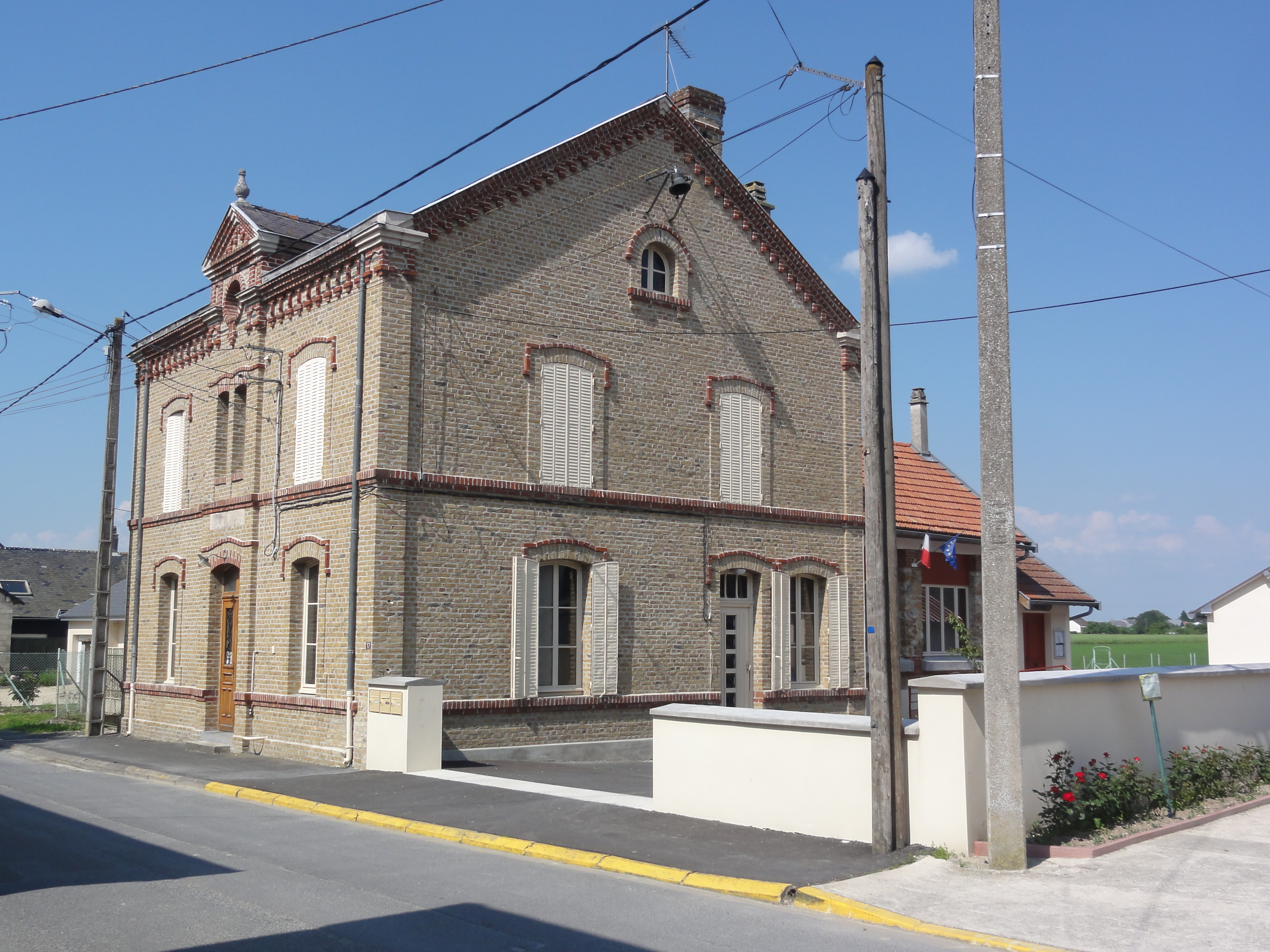
- The Town Hall
- Location of Aire
- Location within France Location within Grand Est
- Coordinates: 49°28′56″N 4°09′44″E
- Country: France
- Region: Grand Est
- Department: Ardennes
- Arrondissement: Rethel
- Canton: Château-Porcien
- Intercommunality: Pays Rethélois

Government
  - Mayor (2020–2026): Olivier Flauzac
- Area^{1}: 6.29 km^{2} (2.43 sq mi)
- Elevation: 70 m (230 ft)
- Highest elevation: 125 m (410 ft)
- Lowest elevation: 61 m (200 ft)
- Population (2023): 251
  - Density: 39.9/km^{2} (103/sq mi)
- Time zone: UTC+01:00 (CET)
  - Summer (DST): UTC+02:00 (CEST)
- INSEE/Postal code: 08004 /08190
- ^{1} French Land Register data, which excludes lakes, ponds, glaciers > 1 km^{2} (0.386 sq mi or 247 acres) and river estuaries.

Aire (French pronunciation: [ɛːʁ]) is a commune in the Ardennes department in the Grand Est region of northern France.

== Geography ==
Aire is some 15 km south by south west of Rethel midway on a direct line between Rethel and Guignicourt. The commune is traversed by Highway D926 running south-west from Blanzy-la-Salonnaise through the town of Aire and continuing south-west to Asfield. The only other access is by small country roads which criss-cross the commune. The commune is almost entirely farmland except for a small area of forest in the north. The Aisne river forms a small part of the northern border and the northern area of the commune is traversed by the Canal des Ardennes. There are no streams or hamlets in the commune.

=== Neighbouring Communes and Villages ===
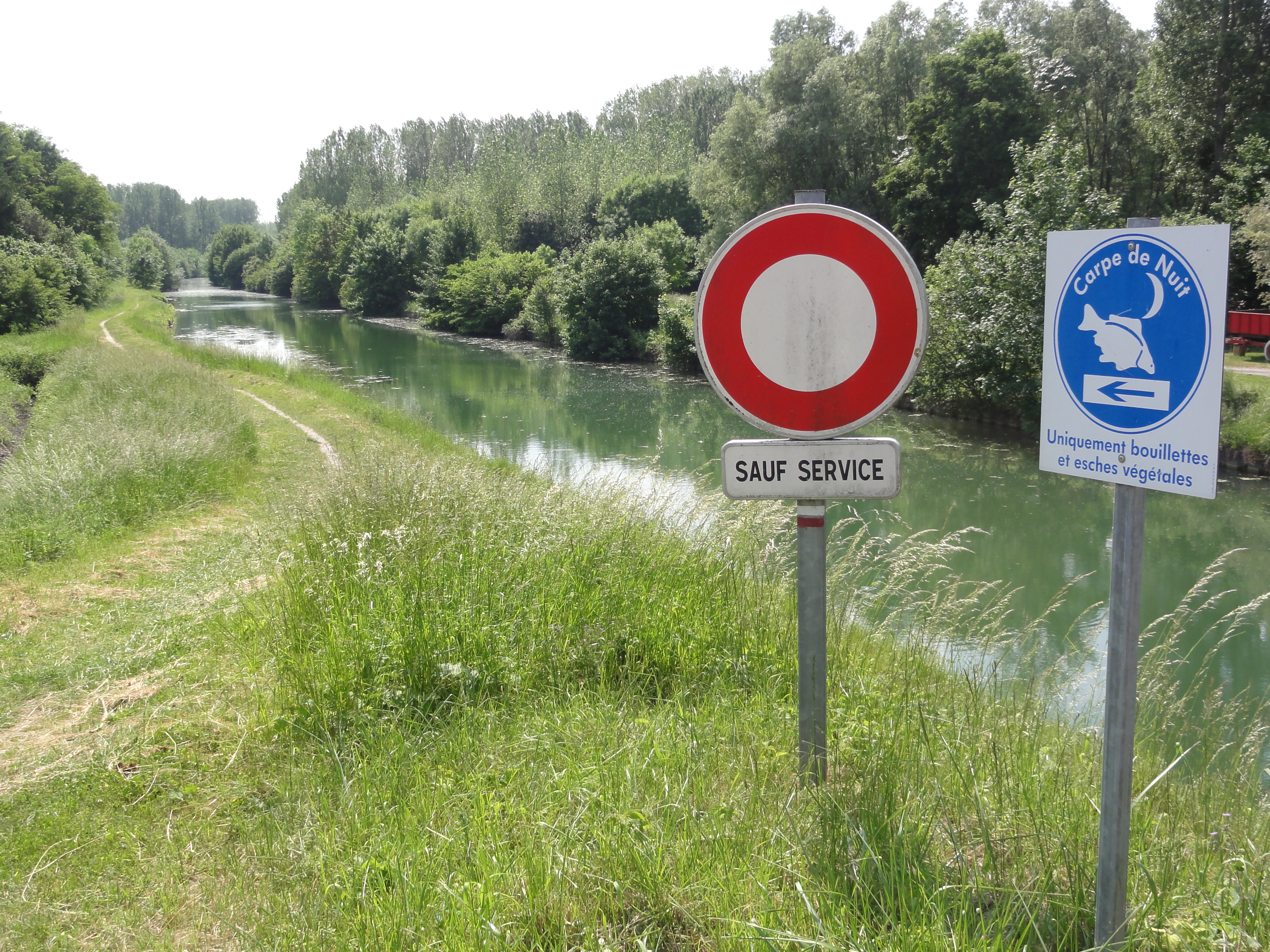
Canal des Ardennes at Aire

== History ==
The village suffered from fighting during the Wars of Religion between the Leaguers and the Calvinists in the wake of the killings at Gomont on the other side of the Aisne in May 1590.

It also suffered fires that ravaged much of the village in 1770 and 1780.

On the 1 March 1789 the inhabitants of the town, who were attached to the Bailiwick of Reims, wrote a list of grievances. The town then had 98 "fires". Through the concerns mentioned in this list of grievances some activities were highlighted, including the vineyards, and the cultivation of hemp that villagers wanted to rett in the river unmolested.

== Administration ==
List of Successive Mayors of Aire

From	To	Name
1983	2001	Michel Henry
2001	2003	Claude Gillet
2003	2014	Isabelle Henry
2014	Current	Olivier Flauzac

== Population ==
Historical population
Year	Pop.	±% p.a.
1968	182	—
1975	180	−0.16%
1982	160	−1.67%
1990	163	+0.23%
1999	205	+2.58%
2007	231	+1.50%
2012	211	−1.79%
2017	220	+0.84%
2023	251	+2.22%
Source: INSEE

== Economy ==
=== Agriculture ===
There are three farming operations (EARL) headquartered in Aire, but many households are retired farmers, or farms in operation, but whose main buildings are in the nearby village. So the farmers, the old farmers, and their families occupy a large part though not the majority, of the population of Aire.

The farming activity is also significant.

=== Industries and services ===
There is no industrial area in Aire.

The commune of Aire has few services as the town is very small and the complete services are available in Asfeld, 4 kilometres away. There is a garage, a roofer, and a carpentry business in Aire.

Other services come from outside: the baker of the commune comes from Saint-Germainmont (but lives in Aire) passes through Aire every day.

Outside of farmers and artisans working on site or nearby, employment in Aire is split between the towns of Rethel and of Reims through commuting.

Two cottages offer accommodation next to the pond in Aire.

== Local life ==
The Association of Flying Fools of Aire consists of fifteen model aircraft enthusiasts who have a flying field 250 metres by 30 metres.

== Sites and Monuments ==
- The Church contains a painted Tribune (1588) which is registered as an historical object.
- The Étang d'Aire (Pond of Aire)
- Aire is a stage on the Route Porcien
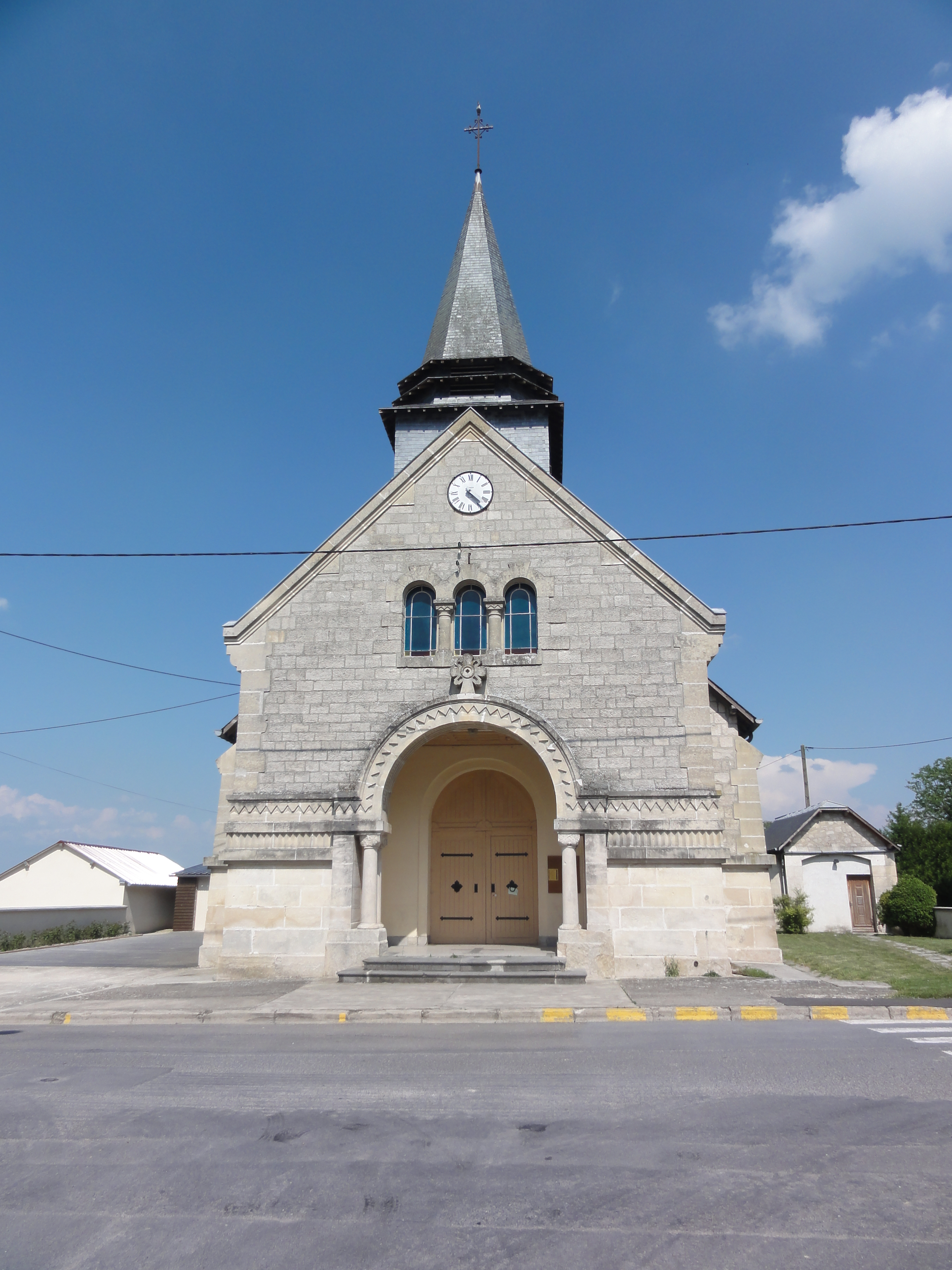
Church

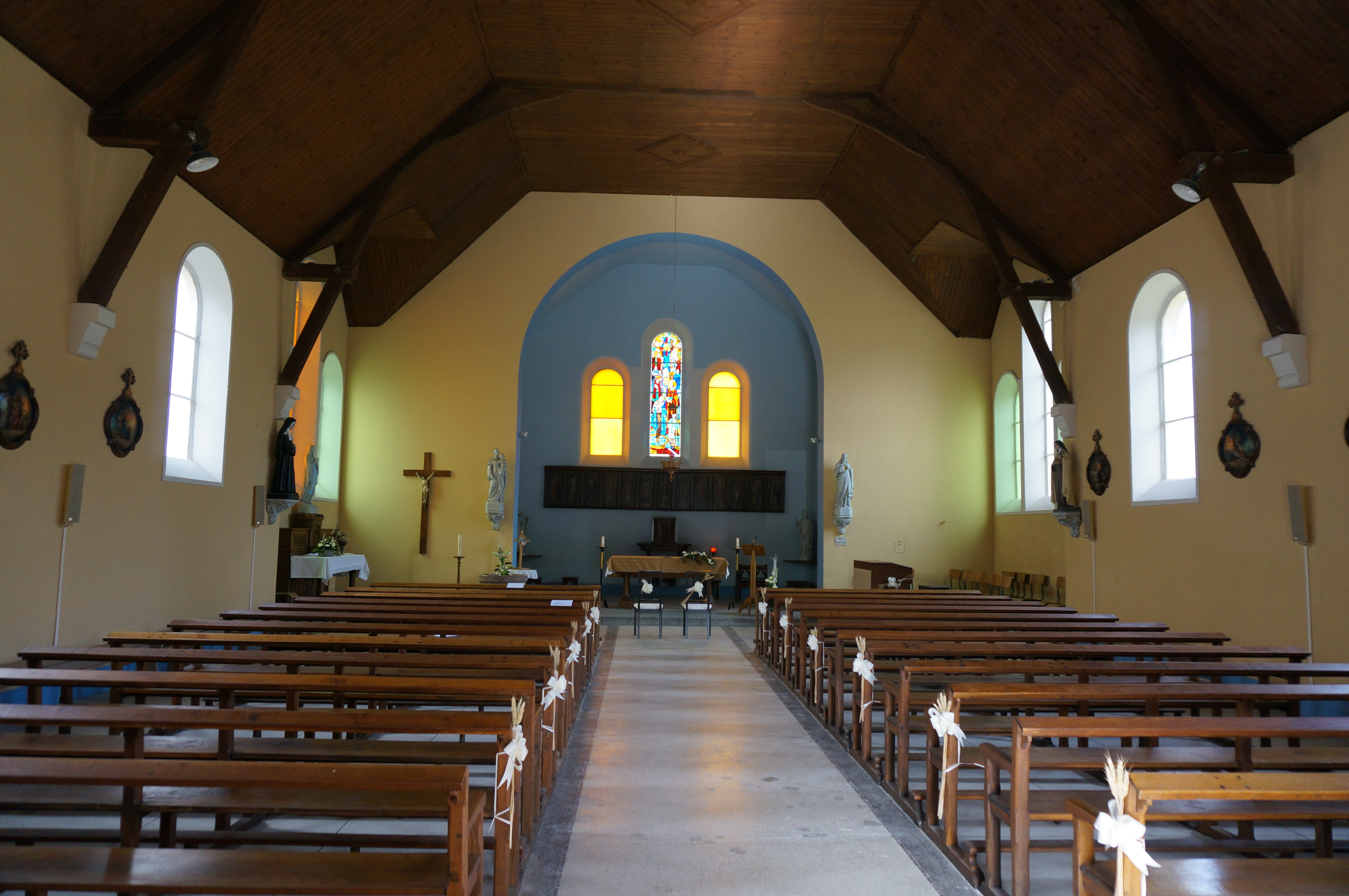
The nave of the church

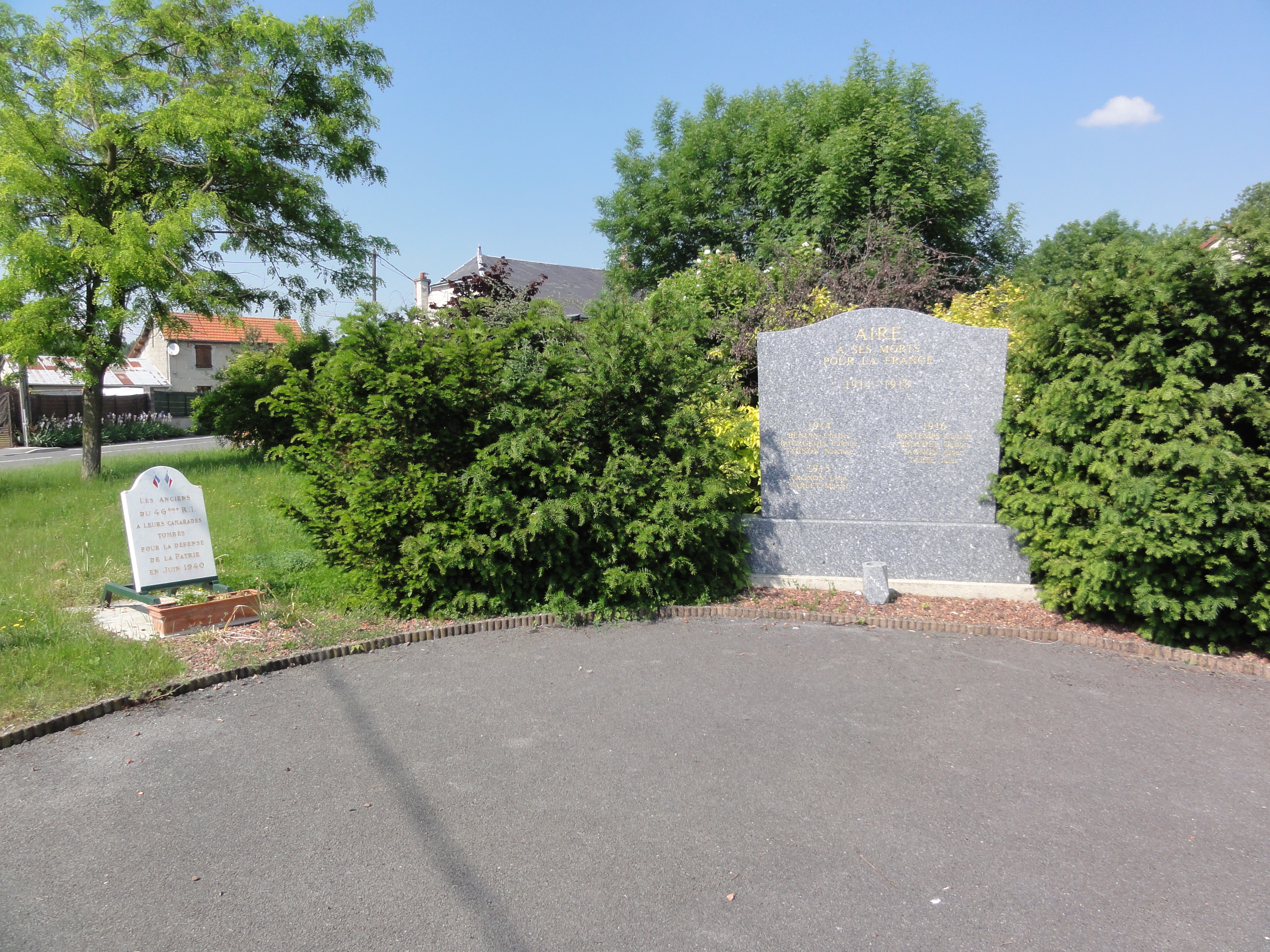
War Memorial

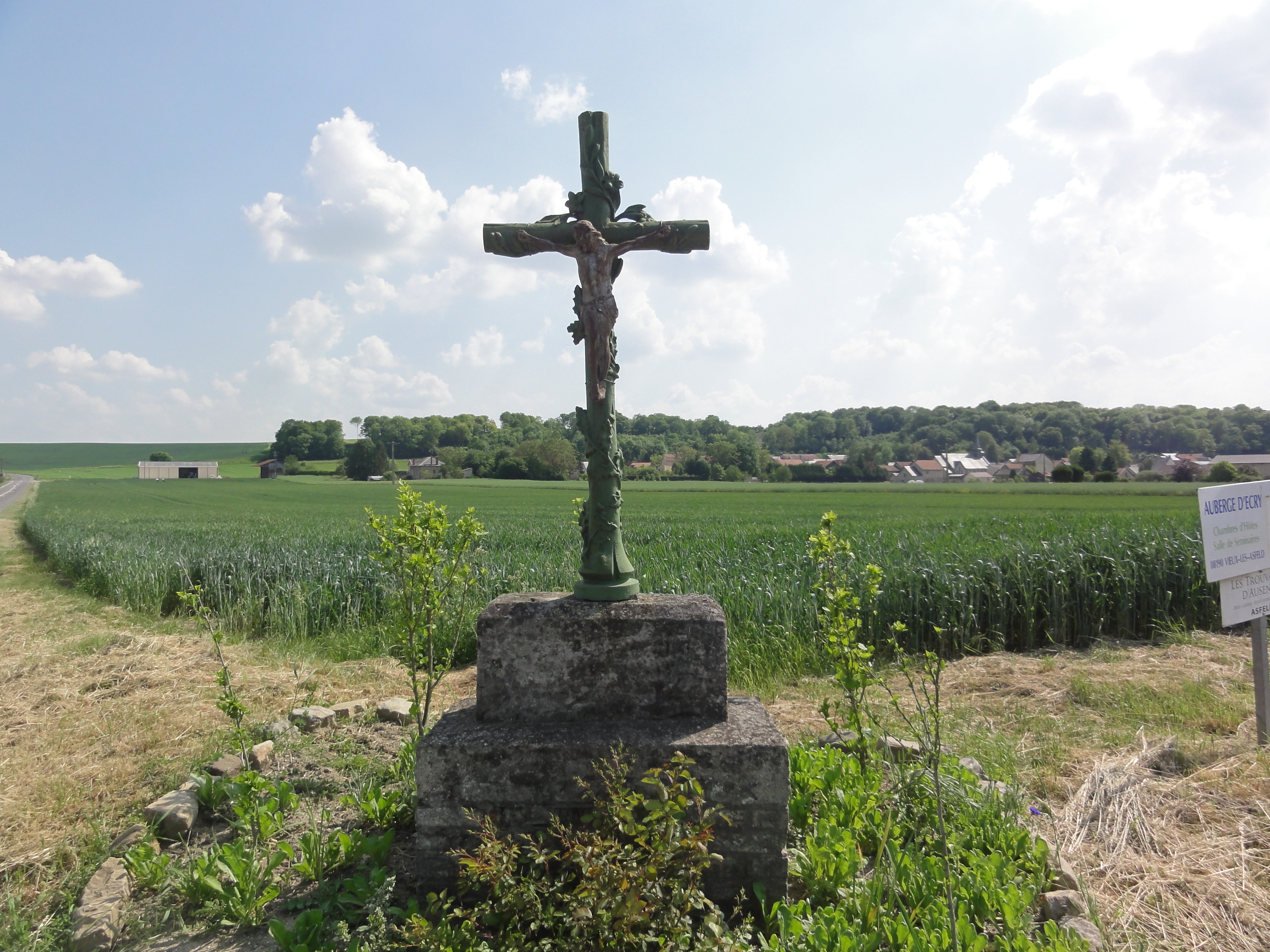
Wayside Cross
Paintings in the Church

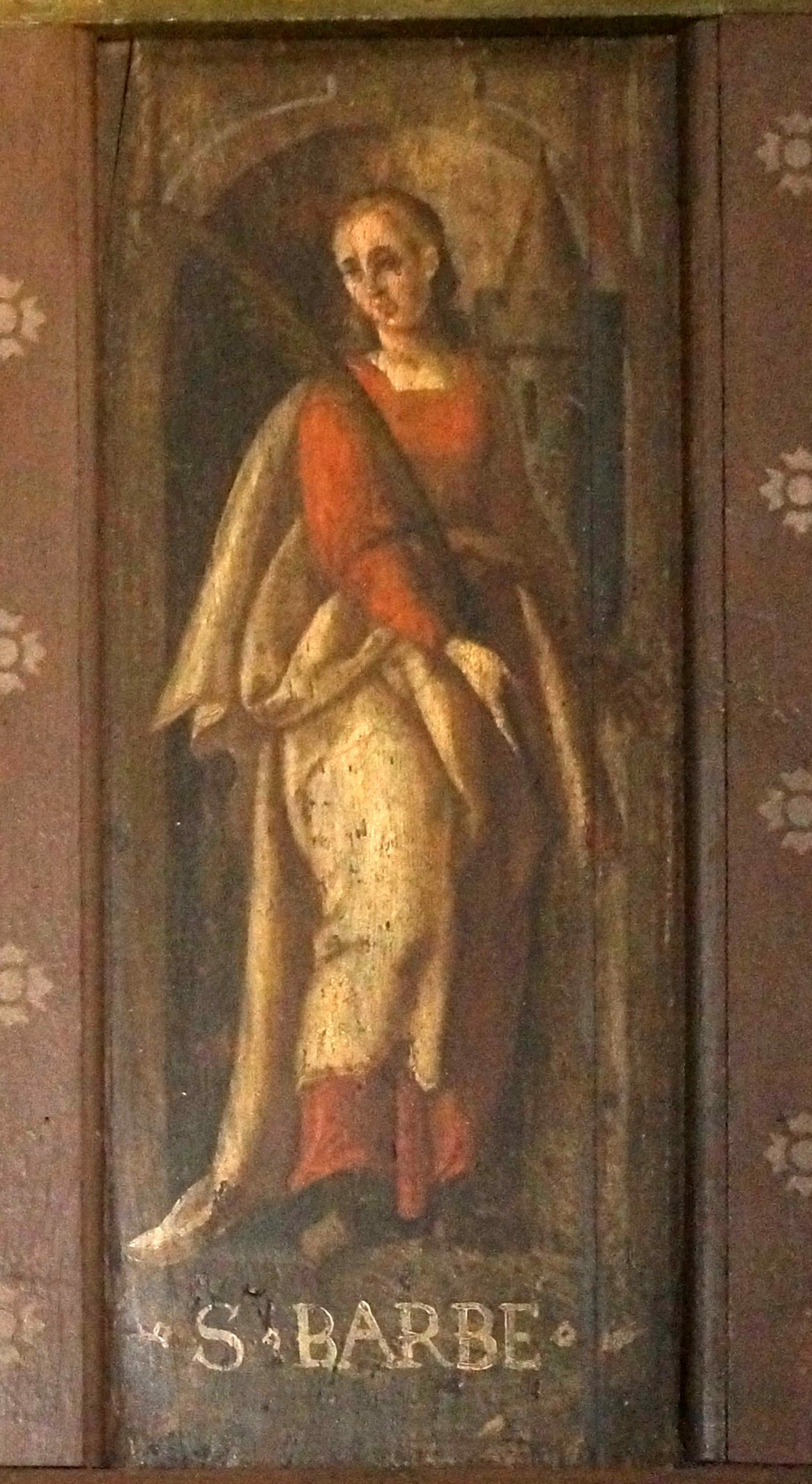
Barbe

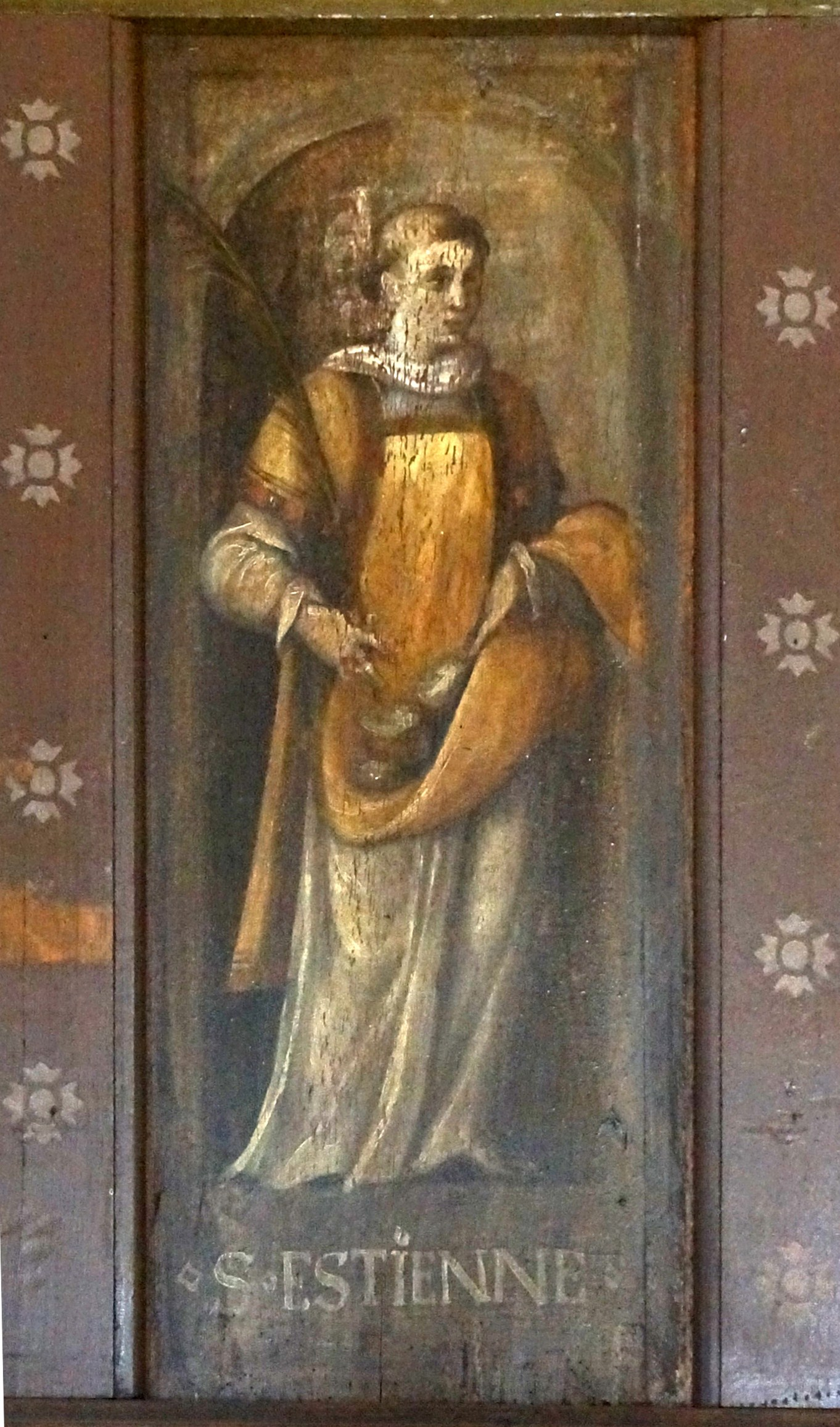
Estienne

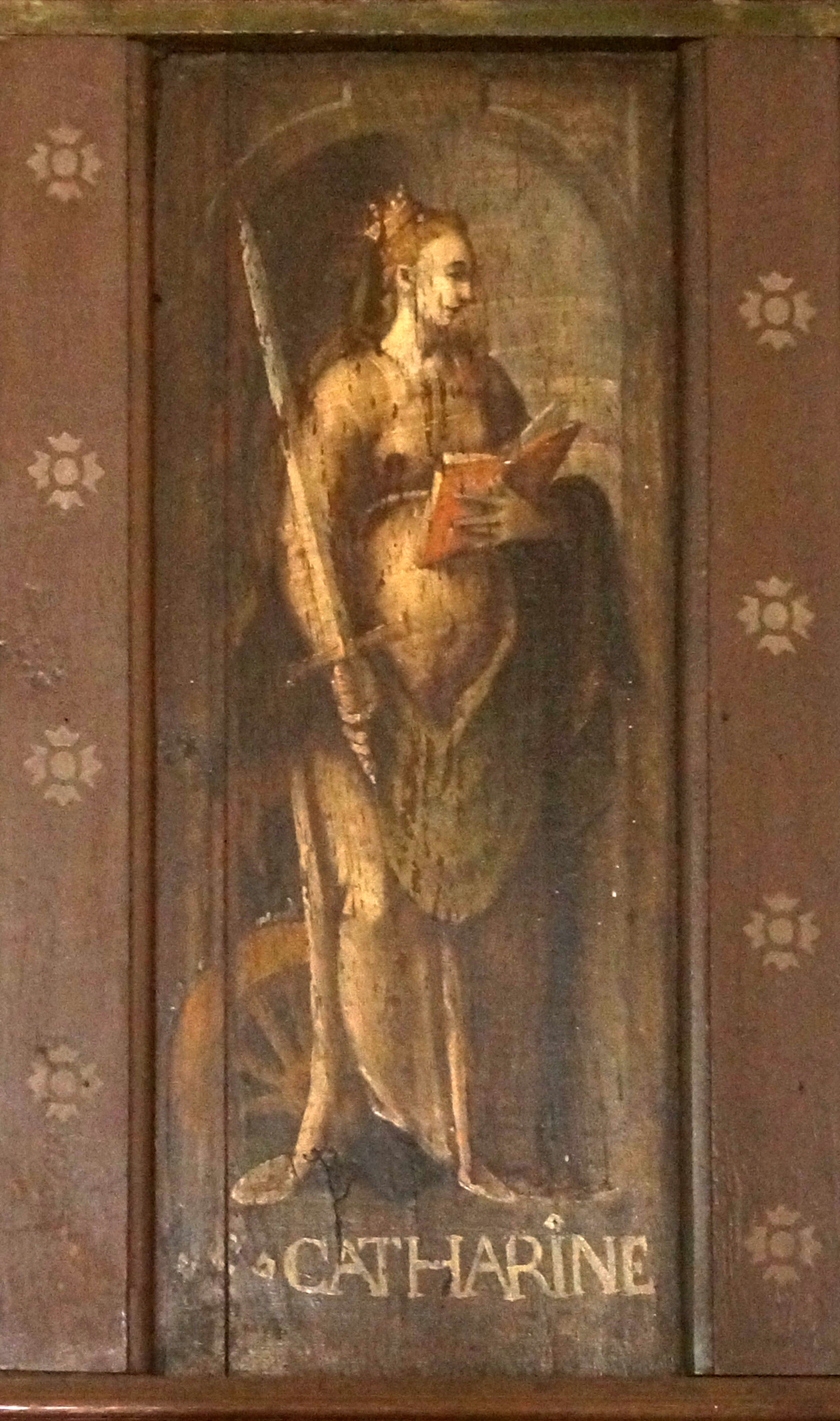
Catherine

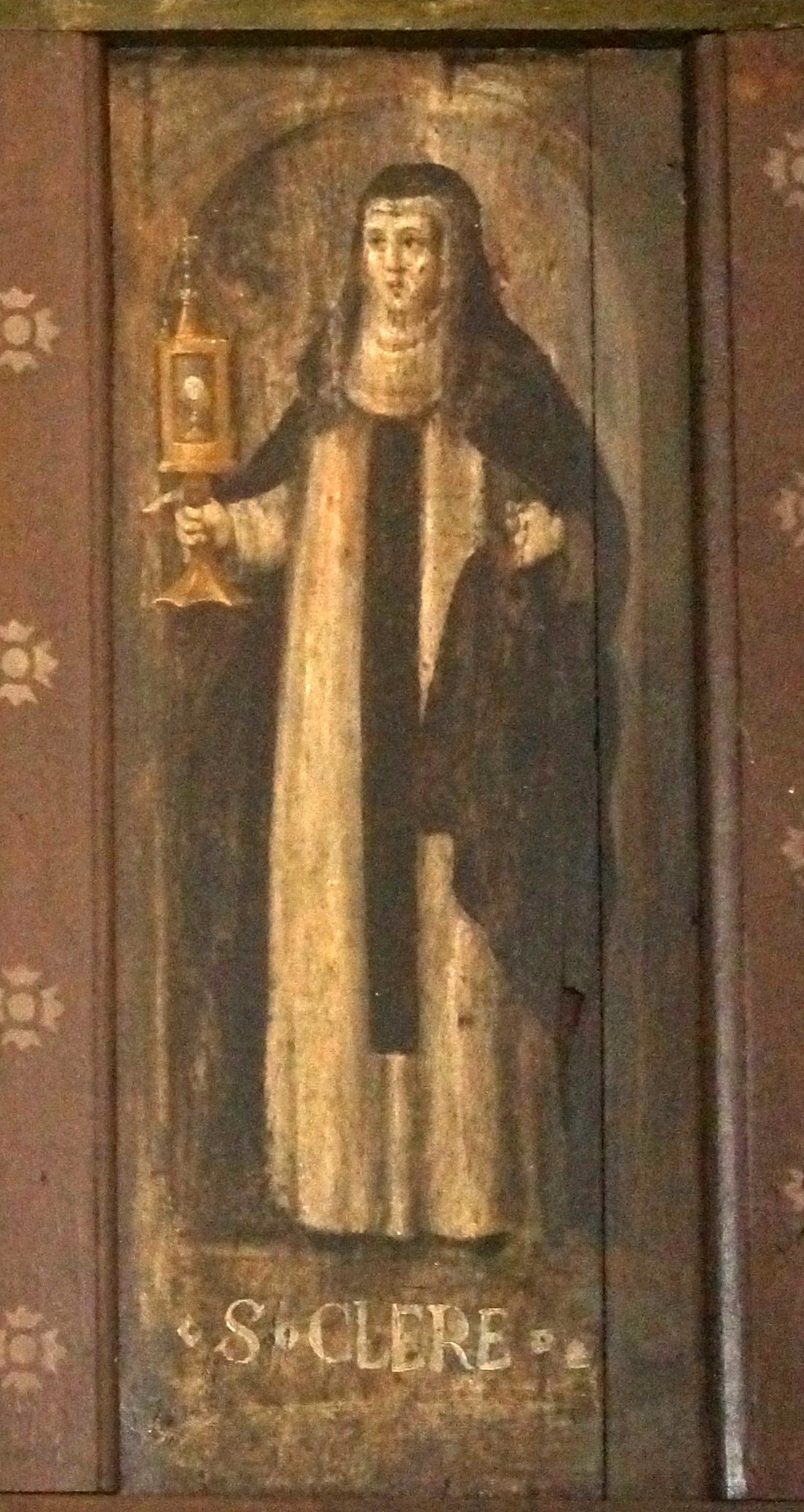
Clere

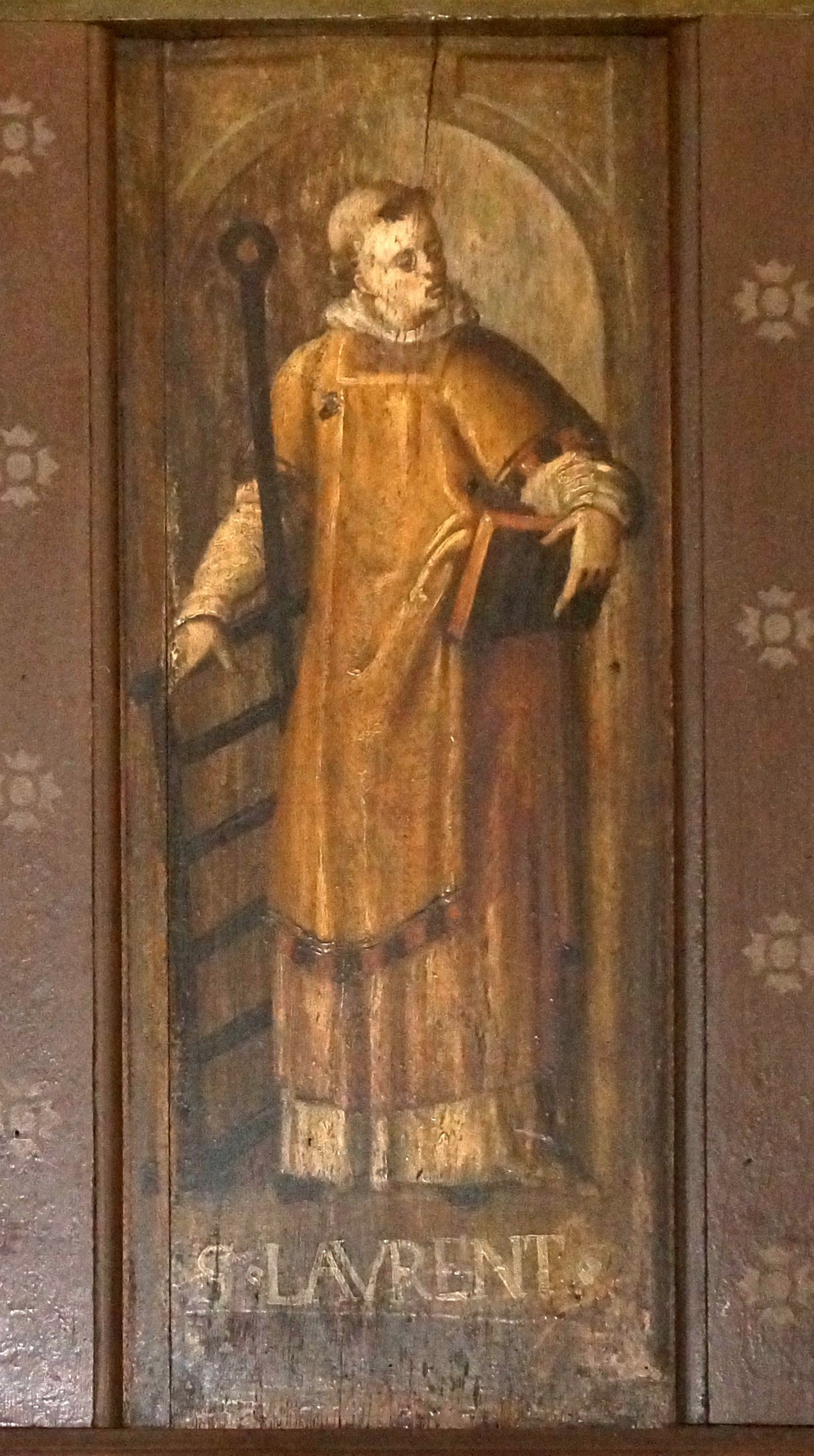
Laurent

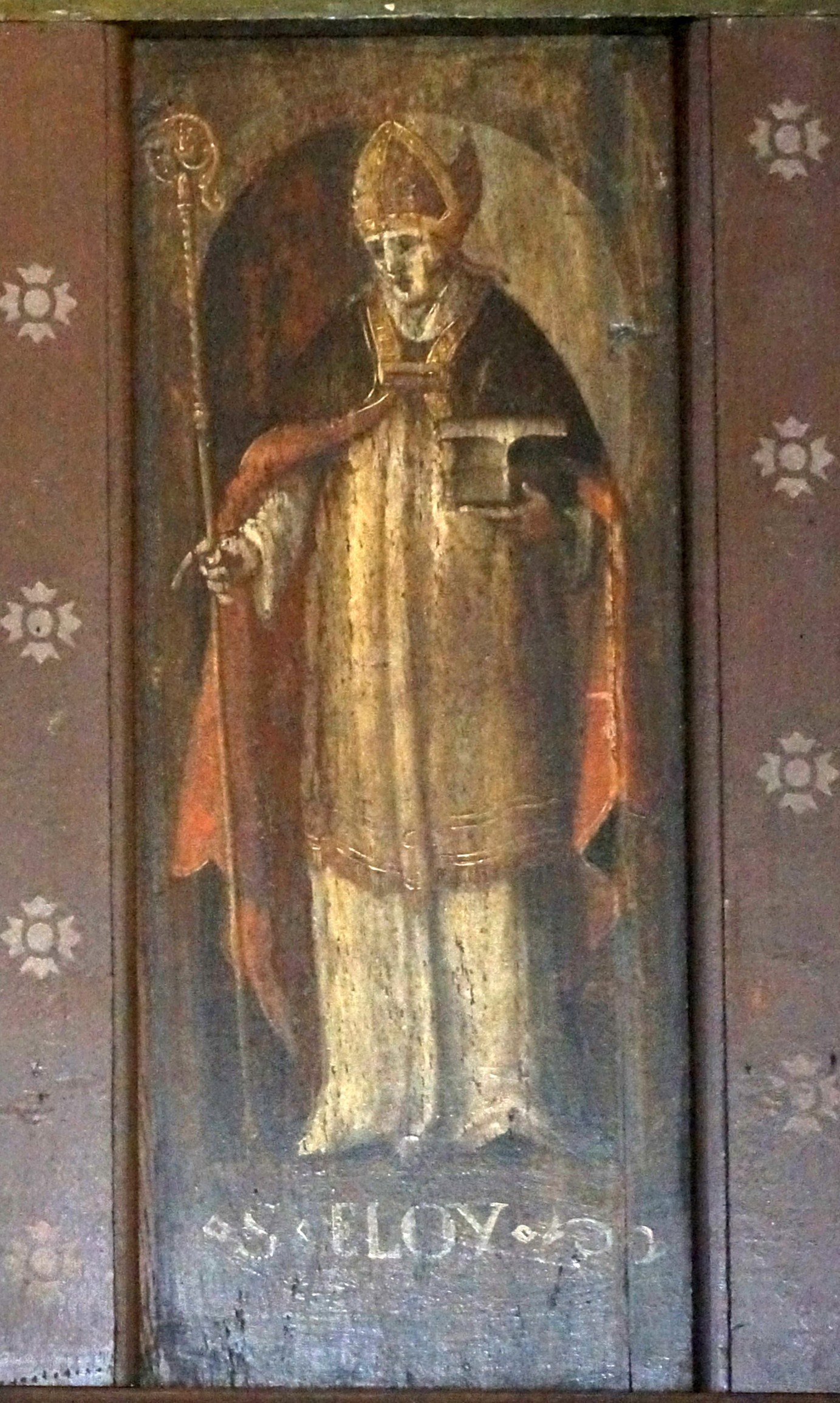
Eloy

== See also ==
- Communes of the Ardennes department
