= Ardennes Canal =

Canal in northern France

Canal des Ardennes
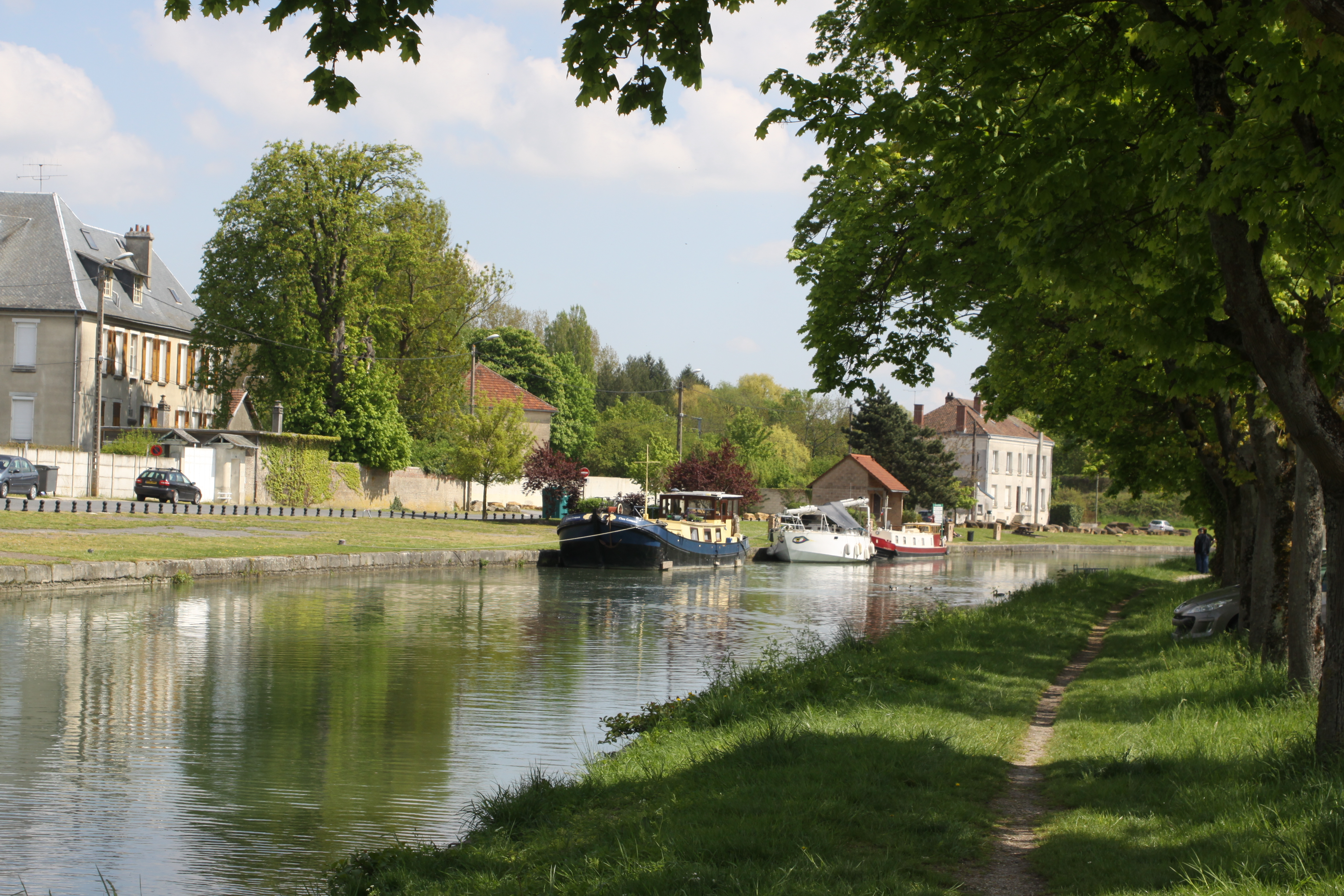
- Canal des Ardennes at Rethel

Specifications
- Length: 88 km (55 mi)
- Maximum boat length: 38.50 m (126.3 ft)
- Maximum boat beam: 5.05 m (16.6 ft)
- Locks: 44
- Maximum height above sea level: 151.3 m (496 ft)
- Minimum height above sea level: 60.55 m (198.7 ft)
- Navigation authority: VNF

History
- Date approved: 1820
- Construction began: 1823-1827
- Date of first use: 1831
- Date completed: 1835

Geography
- Start point: Vieux-lès-Asfeld
- End point: Pont-a-Bar (Dom-le-Mesnil)
- Beginning coordinates: 49.4489°N 4.0953°E
- Ending coordinates: 49.6936°N 4.83°E
- Branch(es): Canal de Vouziers
- Connects to: Canal de la Meuse (river Meuse), Canal latéral à l'Aisne

The Canal des Ardennes (French pronunciation: [kanal de.z‿aʁdɛn], literally Ardennes Canal) is a summit level canal built to the Freycinet gauge between the river valleys of the Aisne and the Meuse.

== Physical Characteristics ==
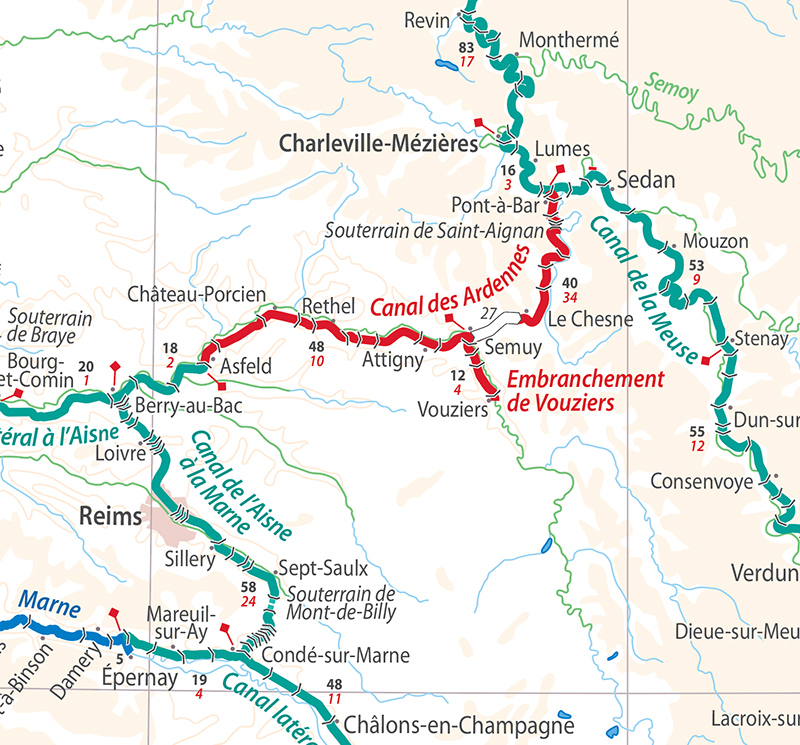
Location of Canal des Ardennes in relation to the other waterways of northeast France (from the European Waterways Map and Directory by David Edwards-May, 5th ed., publ. Transmanche, 2014)

The Canal des Ardennes is 87.779 km long and has 44 locks (37 on the Aisne side and 7 on the Meuse side) with a tunnel in Saint-Aignan. As originally built it was 5.5 km longer, entering the Aisne further downstream, but this section was bypassed by the Canal latéral à l'Aisne in 1841.

The canal connects the village of Pont-à-Bar (in the commune of Dom-le-Mesnil) to the junction with the lateral canal downstream of Vieux-lès-Asfeld. The first part of the canal is 39 km long and crosses the threshold between the valleys of the Meuse and the Aisne by following the Bar Valley, with a short cut through a tunnel at Saint-Aignan. This section of the canal up to the summit level is supplied with water from the Lac de Bairon, with water pumped from the Meuse. After the summit is reached the canal quickly drops down to the Aisne through a series of 27 locks in just 9 km. From Semuy the canal closely follows the course of the Aisne. In places it even follows the old winding river bed, but mostly runs straight through new cuts. On the Aisne side the canal is fed directly by the river Aisne through diversion weirs at Vouziers, Rilly, Givry, Biermes, and Asfeld.

On the Aisne side the Vouziers Branch, 12.066 kilometres long, rises 9 m (following the course of the river Aisne) through 4 locks to the town of Vouziers.

The canal has two separate sections and two series of locks, as if it were made up of two distinct canals. The first is the portion from the Meuse to the Aisne river at the junction with the Vouziers Branch (Pont-à-Bar to Semuy, 39 km). The second is the entire length parallel to the Aisne beginning at Vouziers and continuing parallel to the Aisne to Vieux-lès-Asfeld (61 km).

- Altitude at Vieux-lès-Asfeld: 60.55 metres.
- Altitude at Pont-à-Bar: 151.30 metres.
- Altitude at the summit level: 165 metres.
- Average lock height: 2.68 metres.
  - Aisne side: 2.70 metres.
  - Meuse side: 2.57 metres.

== History ==
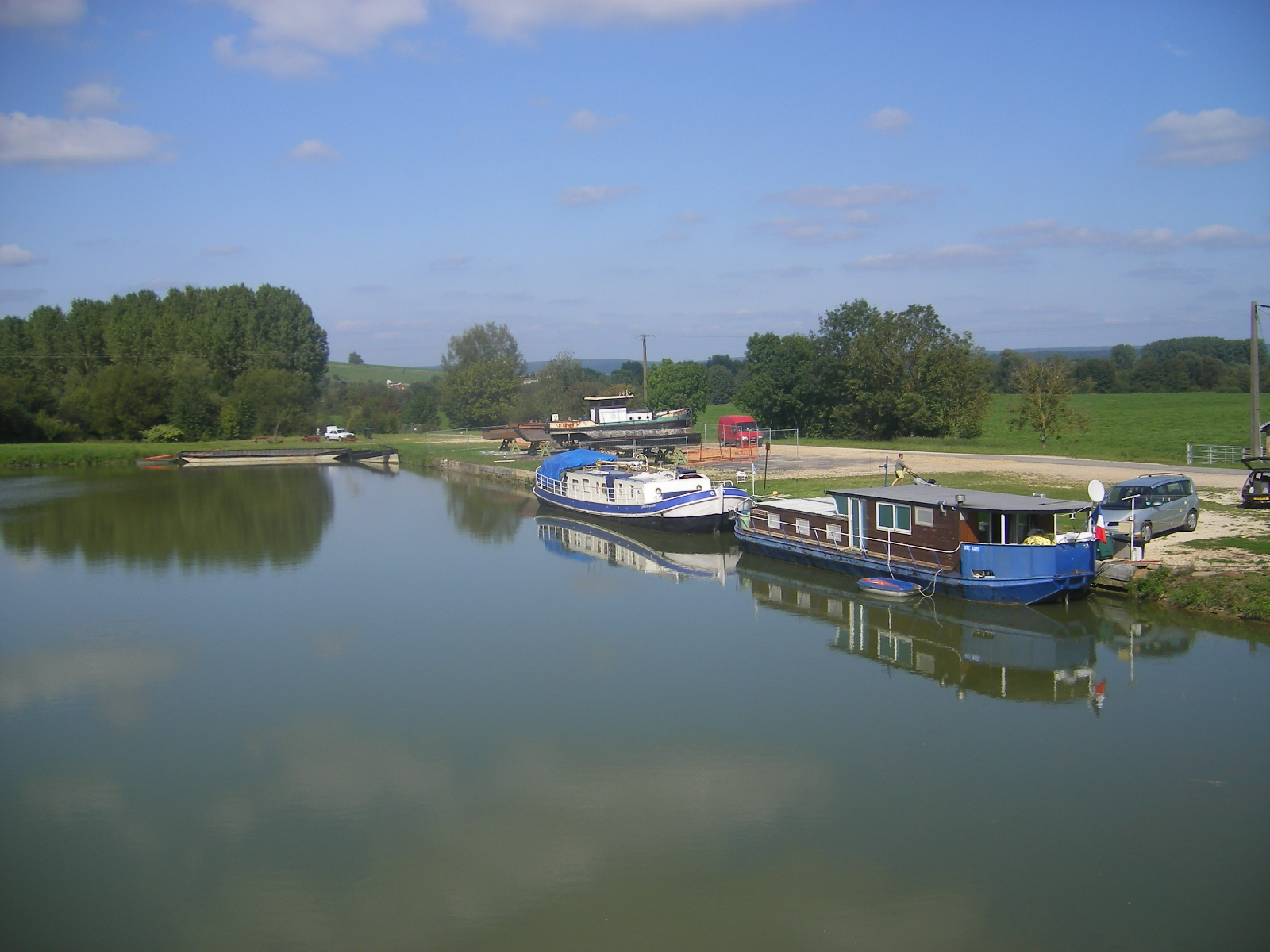
The Canal des Ardennes at Pont-a-Bar

The first canal projects in the region date from 1684 under the Louvois ministry and consisted of using and extending the course of the Bar which was then navigable. Various proposals were made over the decades and, in letters patent of June 1776 – almost a century later – the Prince of Conti was granted the privilege of its construction and operation. The prince died shortly after and nothing was done. After the French Revolution of 1789 the National Constituent Assembly relaunched the project but found fault with previous studies and the project did not proceed.

In "Year VIII" (1800), the local general councilors reminded the government of the project. The prefect Joseph Frain supported and argues for the canal, on the basis of a new route, in a report on 4 October 1800 to the Interior Minister, Lucien Bonaparte. The subsequent Interior Minister, the scientist Jean-Antoine Chaptal, agreed to undertake construction but granted only very limited funds. Work began slowly It became more important during the Bourbon Restoration with the launch in 1820 of a loan to finance the project.

The opening of the canal took place between 1827 and 1835 with modernization between 1842 and 1846. The Vouziers Branch was opened to shipping in 1836. For the part parallel to the Aisner downstream of Lock No. 26 at Rilly initially, until the dams were built, these parts of the navigable canal were connected by a series of artificial reaches.

From 1842 to 1845 improvements were being made, in particular through the creation of the reservoir and the artificial Lake Bairon.

=== Appearance of a Weed ===
The plant Matricaria discoidea (Pineapple weed, wild Chamomile), a native of North America, appeared in 1861 along the Canal des Ardennes and then from 1880 to 1895 in the North of France. It spread so rapidly that it displaced the native Tripleurospermum inodorum "to seem as native as he".

== Ports ==
- The most important port is Rethel
- There are Marinas or stops in: Rethel, Attigny, Semuy, Vouziers, and Le Chesne

== Sources ==
By date of Publication

- J. Dutens, History of inland navigation in France, vol. 1, Paris, A. Sautelet & Cie and Alexander Mesnier, 1829, 651 p., pp. 536–550 (in French)
- Jean-Baptiste Victor Vifquain, Waterways in Belgium, Historical Considerations followed by various proposals aimed at improving and extending navigation, Brussels, Em Devroye, 1842, 497 pp., p. 122-128 (in French)
- Ernest Grangez, Precise history and statistics on the navigable waterways of France and part of Belgium, Imprimerie Cantrale Chaix Napoleon & Cie, 1855, 796 p., p. 44-51 (in French)
- Pierre Berthot, Treatise on roads, rivers and canals, vol. 3, Paris, Fanchon and Artus, 1898, 959 p., pp. 747–748 (in French)
- Gilles Demuth and Jean Tulard (preface), Ardennes under the First Empire: Prefect Frain (1800-1814), Revue Historique Ardennaise, Vol. XVII, 1982, pp. 133–248 (in French)

== See also ==
Media related to Canal des Ardennes at Wikimedia Commons

- List of canals in France

=== External links ===
- Dictionary of Rivers and Canals in Project Babel: the Canal des Ardennes and the Canal de Vouziers (in French)
- Canal des Ardennes navigation guide; places, ports and moorings on the canal, by the author of Inland Waterways of France, 8th ed., 2010, Imray
- Navigation details for 80 French rivers and canals (French waterways website section)
