= Saint-Aignan, Ardennes =

Saint-Aignan
- Commune
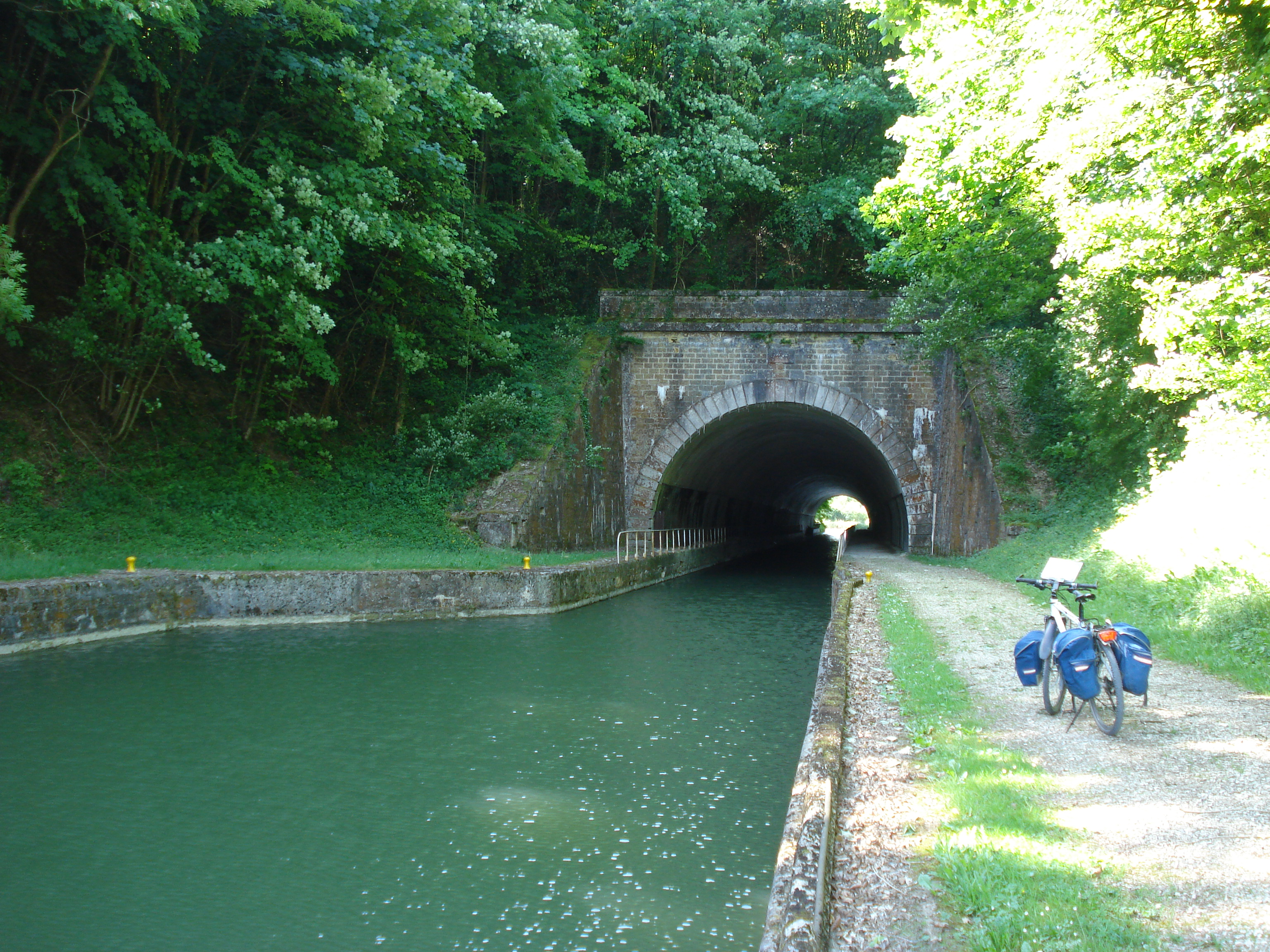
- Canal des Ardennes

- Coat of arms
- Location of Saint-Aignan
- Location within France Location within Grand Est
- Coordinates: 49°39′12″N 4°50′50″E
- Country: France
- Region: Grand Est
- Department: Ardennes
- Arrondissement: Sedan
- Canton: Sedan-1
- Intercommunality: CA Ardenne Métropole

Government
  - Mayor (2023–2026): Delphine Leonard
- Area^{1}: 7.74 km^{2} (2.99 sq mi)
- Elevation: 175 m (574 ft)
- Population (2023): 152
  - Density: 19.6/km^{2} (50.9/sq mi)
- Time zone: UTC+01:00 (CET)
  - Summer (DST): UTC+02:00 (CEST)
- INSEE/Postal code: 08377 /08350
- ^{1} French Land Register data, which excludes lakes, ponds, glaciers > 1 km^{2} (0.386 sq mi or 247 acres) and river estuaries.

Saint-Aignan (French pronunciation: [sɛ̃.t‿ɛɲɑ̃]) is a commune in the Ardennes department in northern France.

== Population ==
Historical population
Year	Pop.	±% p.a.
1968	178	—
1975	146	−2.79%
1982	145	−0.10%
1990	146	+0.09%
1999	150	+0.30%
2007	139	−0.95%
2012	141	+0.29%
2017	149	+1.11%
2023	152	+0.33%
Source: INSEE

== See also ==
- Communes of the Ardennes department
