= Bar (Ardennes river) =

River in Ardennes, France

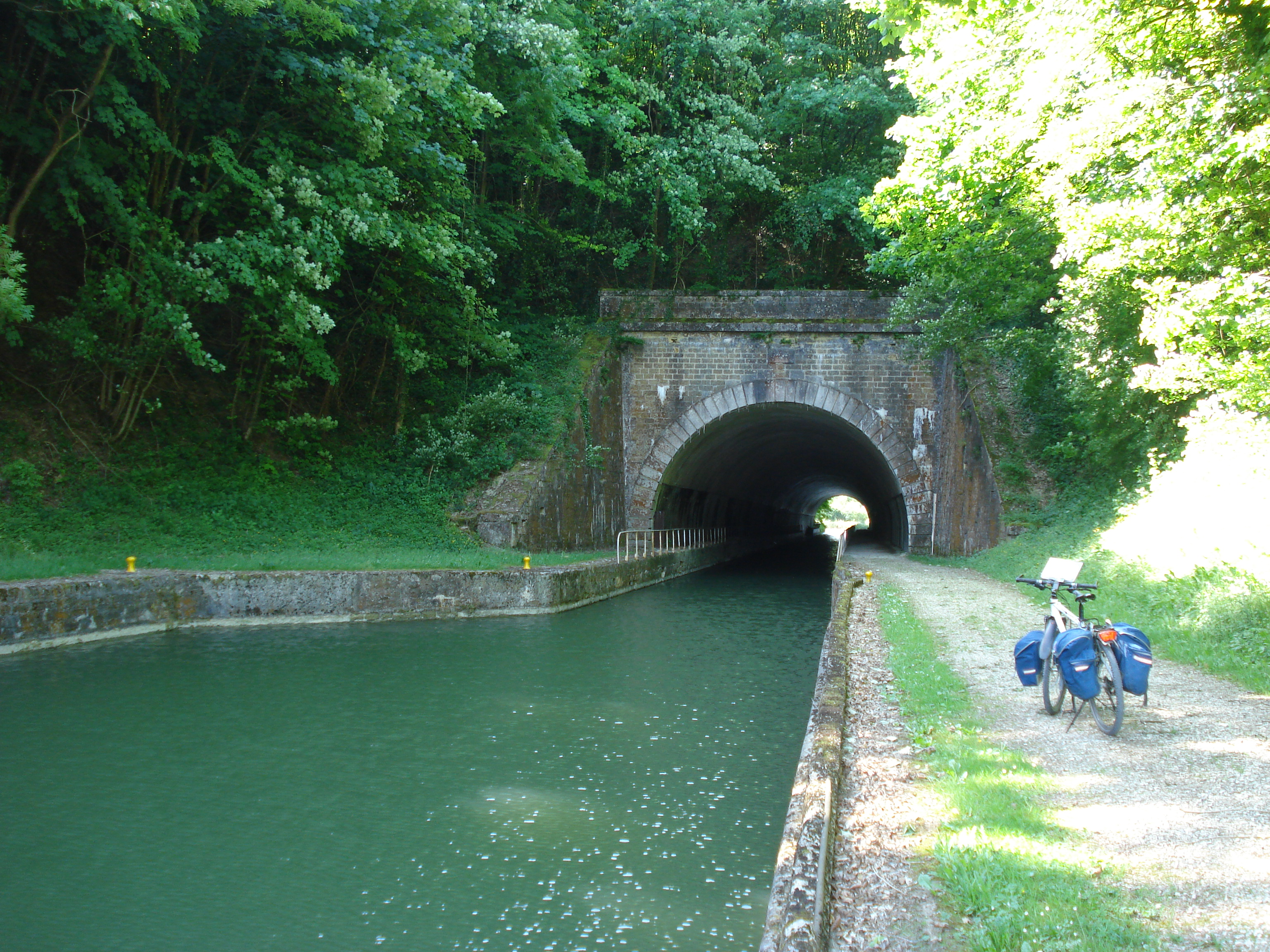

- Location within France Location within Grand Est

Location
- Country: France

Physical characteristics
- Mouth: Meuse
  - coordinates: 49°41′49″N 4°50′27″E
- Length: 62 km (39 mi)

Basin features
- Progression: Meuse→ North Sea

The Bar (French pronunciation: [baʁ]) is a river in the Ardennes department, northern France, left tributary of the river Meuse. It is 62 km (39 mi) long. Its source is near Buzancy, in the southern part of the Ardennes department. It flows through Brieulles-sur-Bar, Tannay, Chémery-sur-Bar and Cheveuges. It flows into the Meuse in Vrigne-Meuse, west of Sedan. For much of its length the river flows parallel to the Canal des Ardennes.
