= Brieulles-sur-Bar =

- Commune
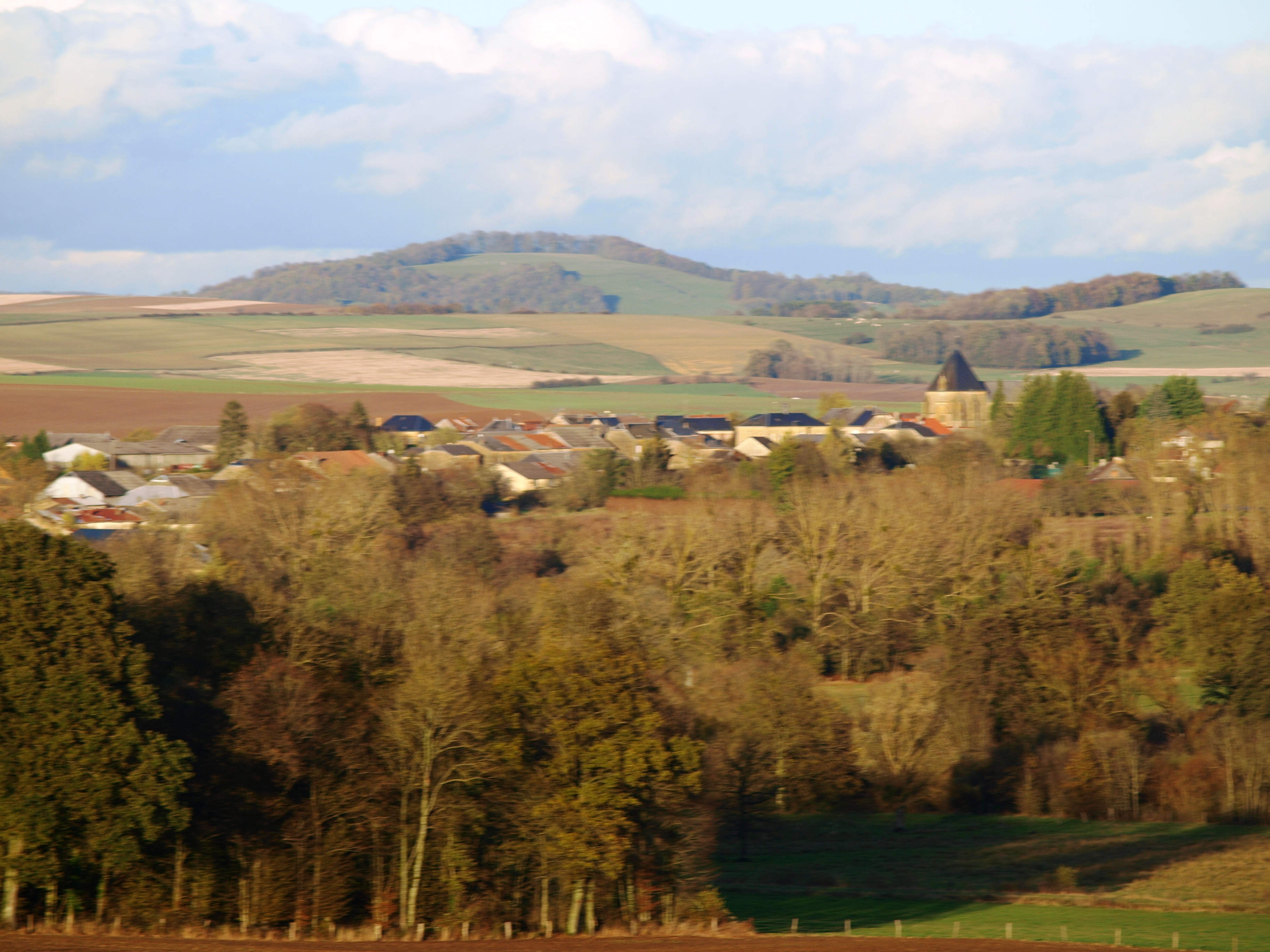
- A general view of Brieulles-sur-Bar

- Coat of arms
- Location of Brieulles-sur-Bar
- Location within France Location within Grand Est
- Coordinates: 49°28′40″N 4°51′15″E
- Country: France
- Region: Grand Est
- Department: Ardennes
- Arrondissement: Vouziers
- Canton: Vouziers
- Intercommunality: Argonne Ardennaise

Government
  - Mayor (2020–2026): Alain Sembeni
- Area^{1}: 13.23 km^{2} (5.11 sq mi)
- Elevation: 185 m (607 ft)
- Highest elevation: 246 m (807 ft)
- Lowest elevation: 162 m (531 ft)
- Population (2023): 224
  - Density: 16.9/km^{2} (43.9/sq mi)
- Time zone: UTC+01:00 (CET)
  - Summer (DST): UTC+02:00 (CEST)
- INSEE/Postal code: 08085 /08240
- ^{1} French Land Register data, which excludes lakes, ponds, glaciers > 1 km^{2} (0.386 sq mi or 247 acres) and river estuaries.

Brieulles-sur-Bar (French pronunciation: [bʁijœl syʁ baʁ], literally Brieulles on Bar) is a commune in the Ardennes department in northern France.

== Population ==
Historical population
| Year | Pop. | ±% p.a. |
|---|---|---|
| 1968 | 239 | — |
| 1975 | 196 | −2.79% |
| 1982 | 196 | +0.00% |
| 1990 | 175 | −1.41% |
| 1999 | 202 | +1.61% |
| 2007 | 219 | +1.02% |
| 2012 | 182 | −3.63% |
| 2017 | 217 | +3.58% |
| 2023 | 224 | +0.53% |
Source: INSEE

== See also ==
- Communes of the Ardennes department
- List of medieval bridges in France
