= Semuy =

- Commune
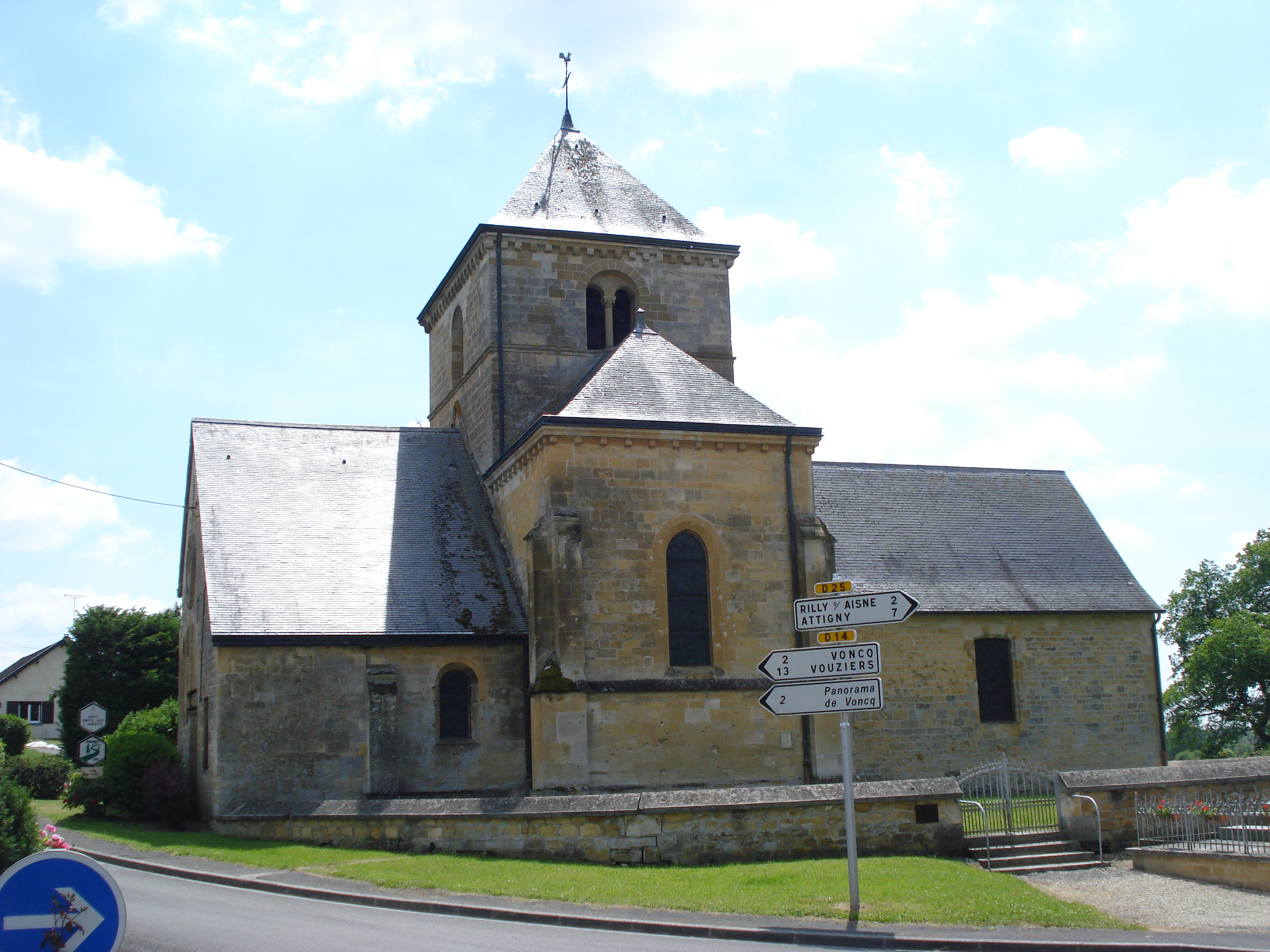
- The church in Semuy
- Location of Semuy
- Location within France Location within Grand Est
- Coordinates: 49°29′18″N 4°39′32″E
- Country: France
- Region: Grand Est
- Department: Ardennes
- Arrondissement: Vouziers
- Canton: Attigny
- Intercommunality: Crêtes Préardennaises

Government
  - Mayor (2020–2026): Jean Frankart
- Area^{1}: 3.97 km^{2} (1.53 sq mi)
- Elevation: 88 m (289 ft)
- Highest elevation: 162 m (531 ft)
- Lowest elevation: 82 m (269 ft)
- Population (2023): 87
  - Density: 22/km^{2} (57/sq mi)
- Time zone: UTC+01:00 (CET)
  - Summer (DST): UTC+02:00 (CEST)
- INSEE/Postal code: 08411 /08130
- ^{1} French Land Register data, which excludes lakes, ponds, glaciers > 1 km^{2} (0.386 sq mi or 247 acres) and river estuaries.

Semuy is a commune in the Ardennes department in northern France.

== Population ==
Historical population
Year	Pop.	±% p.a.
1968	150	—
1975	153	+0.28%
1982	145	−0.76%
1990	104	−4.07%
1999	100	−0.43%
2007	95	−0.64%
2012	84	−2.43%
2017	90	+1.39%
2023	87	−0.56%
Source: INSEE

== See also ==
- Communes of the Ardennes department
