= Vieux-lès-Asfeld =

- Commune
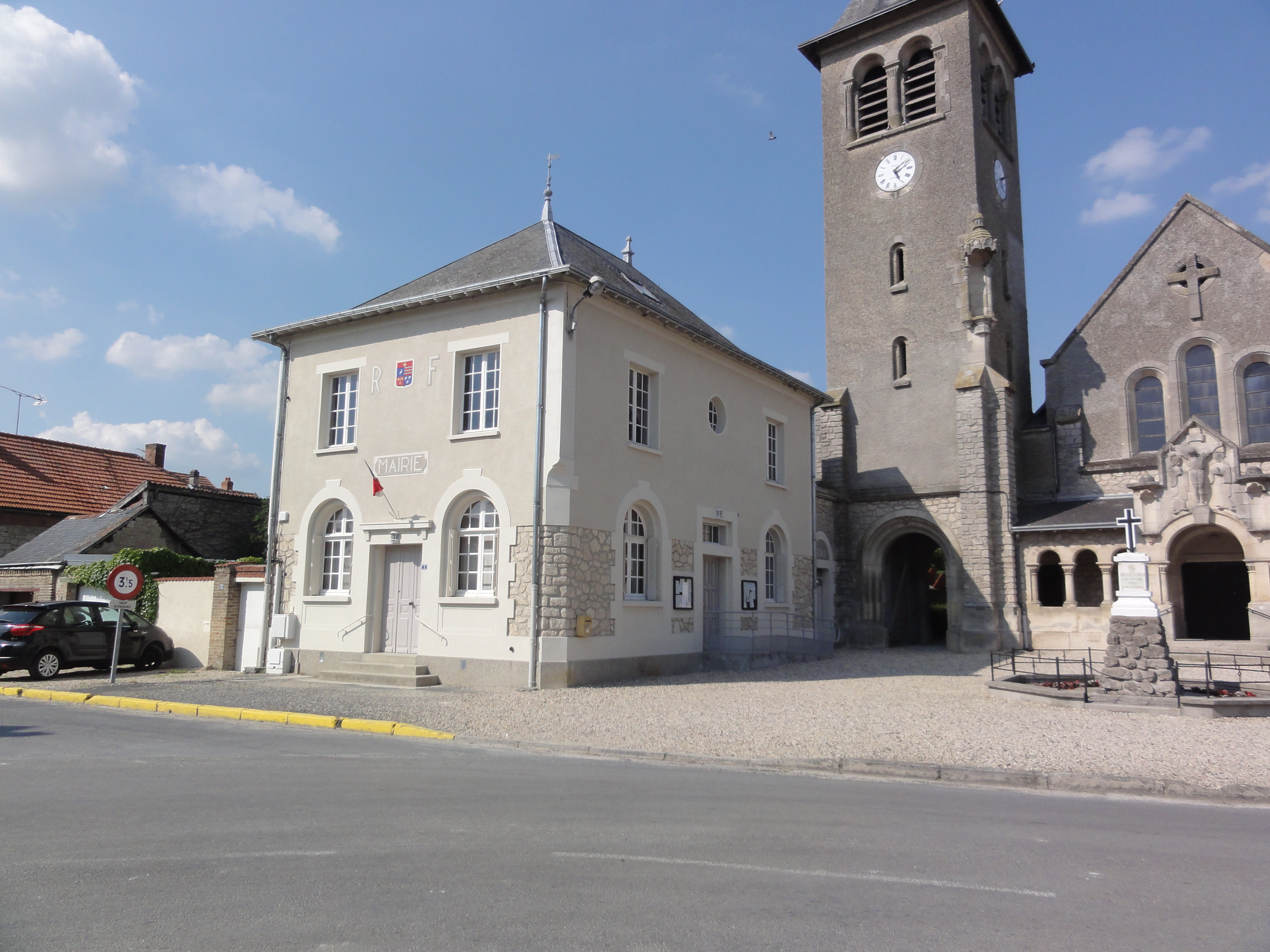
- Town hall and church

- Coat of arms
- Location of Vieux-lès-Asfeld
- Location within France Location within Grand Est
- Coordinates: 49°27′30″N 4°06′15″E
- Country: France
- Region: Grand Est
- Department: Ardennes
- Arrondissement: Rethel
- Canton: Château-Porcien
- Intercommunality: Pays Rethélois

Government
  - Mayor (2020–2026): Emmanuel Brochet
- Area^{1}: 6.66 km^{2} (2.57 sq mi)
- Elevation: 63 m (207 ft)
- Population (2023): 294
  - Density: 44.1/km^{2} (114/sq mi)
- Time zone: UTC+01:00 (CET)
  - Summer (DST): UTC+02:00 (CEST)
- INSEE/Postal code: 08473 /08190
- ^{1} French Land Register data, which excludes lakes, ponds, glaciers > 1 km^{2} (0.386 sq mi or 247 acres) and river estuaries.

Vieux-lès-Asfeld (French pronunciation: [vjø lɛ.z‿asfɛld], literally Vieux near Asfeld) is a commune in the Ardennes department in northern France.

== Population ==
Historical population
Year	Pop.	±% p.a.
1968	264	—
1975	254	−0.55%
1982	241	−0.75%
1990	272	+1.52%
1999	266	−0.25%
2007	260	−0.28%
2012	299	+2.83%
2017	314	+0.98%
2023	294	−1.09%
Source: INSEE

== See also ==
- Communes of the Ardennes department
