= Vrigne-Meuse =

- Commune
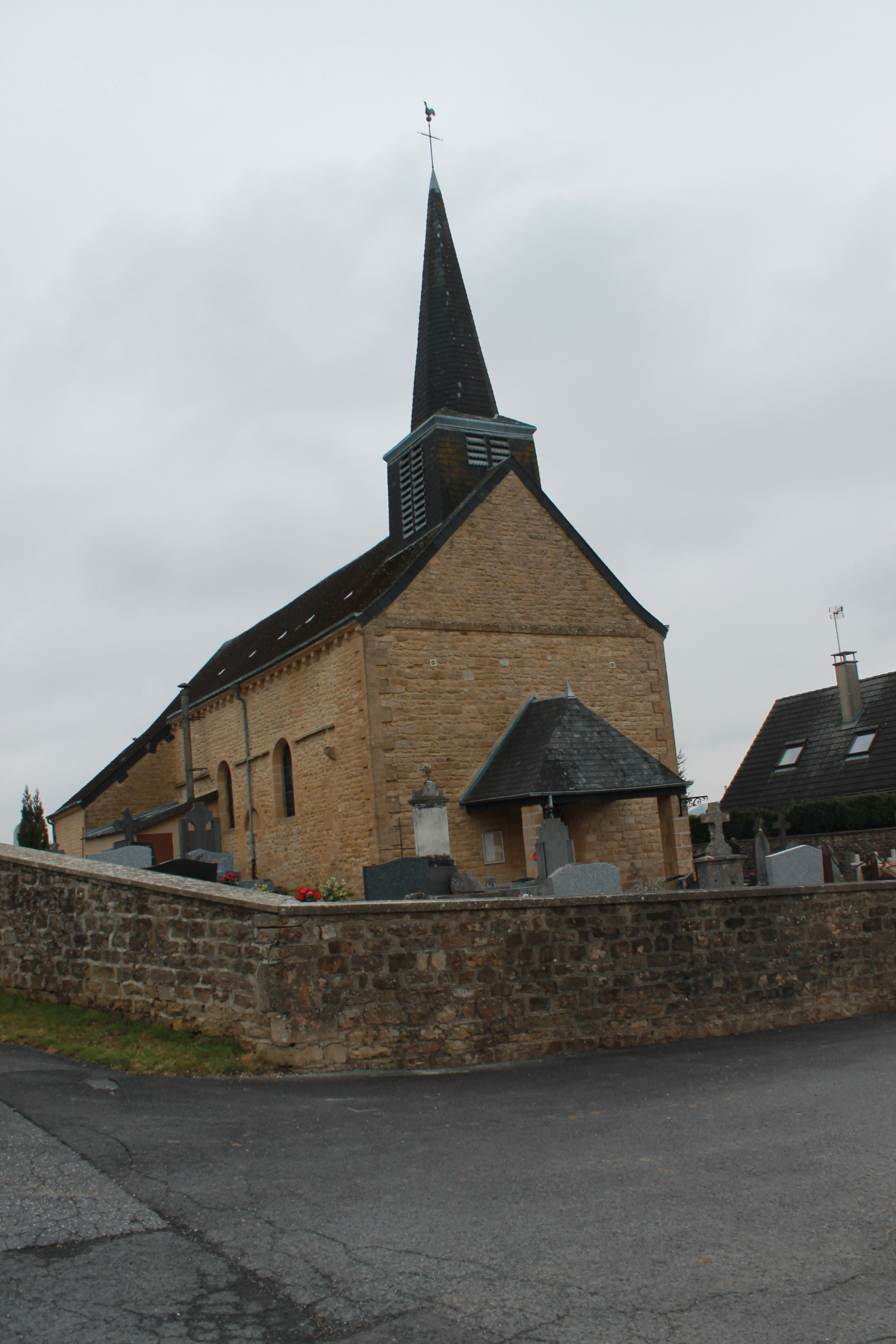
- The church in Vrigne-Meuse

- Coat of arms
- Location of Vrigne-Meuse
- Location within France Location within Grand Est
- Coordinates: 49°42′12″N 4°50′48″E
- Country: France
- Region: Grand Est
- Department: Ardennes
- Arrondissement: Charleville-Mézières
- Canton: Nouvion-sur-Meuse
- Intercommunality: Ardenne Métropole

Government
  - Mayor (2020–2026): Yann Grégoire
- Area^{1}: 4.44 km^{2} (1.71 sq mi)
- Elevation: 151 m (495 ft)
- Highest elevation: 243 m (797 ft)
- Lowest elevation: 146 m (479 ft)
- Population (2023): 331
  - Density: 74.5/km^{2} (193/sq mi)
- Time zone: UTC+01:00 (CET)
  - Summer (DST): UTC+02:00 (CEST)
- INSEE/Postal code: 08492 /08350
- ^{1} French Land Register data, which excludes lakes, ponds, glaciers > 1 km^{2} (0.386 sq mi or 247 acres) and river estuaries.

Vrigne-Meuse (French pronunciation: [vʁiɲ møz]) is a commune in the Ardennes department in northern France.

== History ==
In November 1918, the Battle of Vrigne-Meuse was the last battle of World War I.

== Population ==
Historical population
Year	Pop.	±% p.a.
1968	178	—
1975	183	+0.40%
1982	207	+1.78%
1990	187	−1.26%
1999	191	+0.24%
2007	218	+1.67%
2012	280	+5.13%
2017	300	+1.39%
2023	331	+1.65%
Source: INSEE

== See also ==
- Communes of the Ardennes department
