= Dom-le-Mesnil =

- Commune
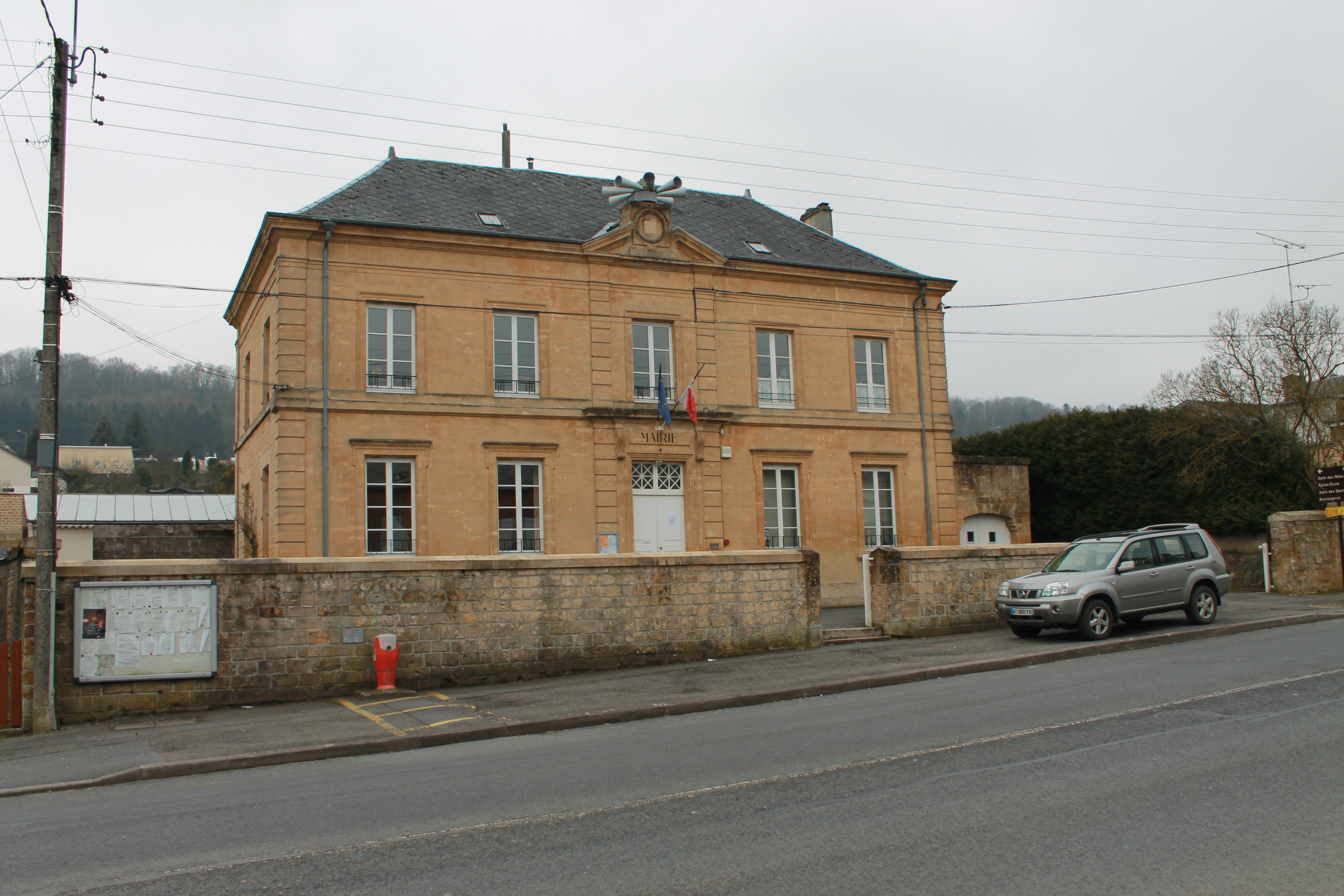
- Town hall

- Coat of arms
- Location of Dom-le-Mesnil
- Location within France Location within Grand Est
- Coordinates: 49°41′25″N 4°48′28″E
- Country: France
- Region: Grand Est
- Department: Ardennes
- Arrondissement: Charleville-Mézières
- Canton: Nouvion-sur-Meuse
- Intercommunality: CA Ardenne Métropole

Government
  - Mayor (2020–2026): Christophe Marot
- Area^{1}: 7.99 km^{2} (3.08 sq mi)
- Elevation: 160 m (520 ft)
- Highest elevation: 297 m (974 ft)
- Lowest elevation: 146 m (479 ft)
- Population (2023): 1,048
  - Density: 131/km^{2} (340/sq mi)
- Time zone: UTC+01:00 (CET)
  - Summer (DST): UTC+02:00 (CEST)
- INSEE/Postal code: 08140 /08160
- ^{1} French Land Register data, which excludes lakes, ponds, glaciers > 1 km^{2} (0.386 sq mi or 247 acres) and river estuaries.

Dom-le-Mesnil (French pronunciation: [dɔ̃ lə menil]) is a commune in the Ardennes department in northern France.

== Population ==
Historical population
Year	Pop.	±% p.a.
1968	979	—
1975	901	−1.18%
1982	927	+0.41%
1990	926	−0.01%
1999	1,047	+1.37%
2007	1,154	+1.22%
2012	1,061	−1.67%
2017	1,087	+0.49%
2023	1,048	−0.61%
Source: INSEE

== See also ==
- Communes of the Ardennes department
