= Hôtel de Ville, Paris =

Town hall of Paris, France

Hôtel de Ville
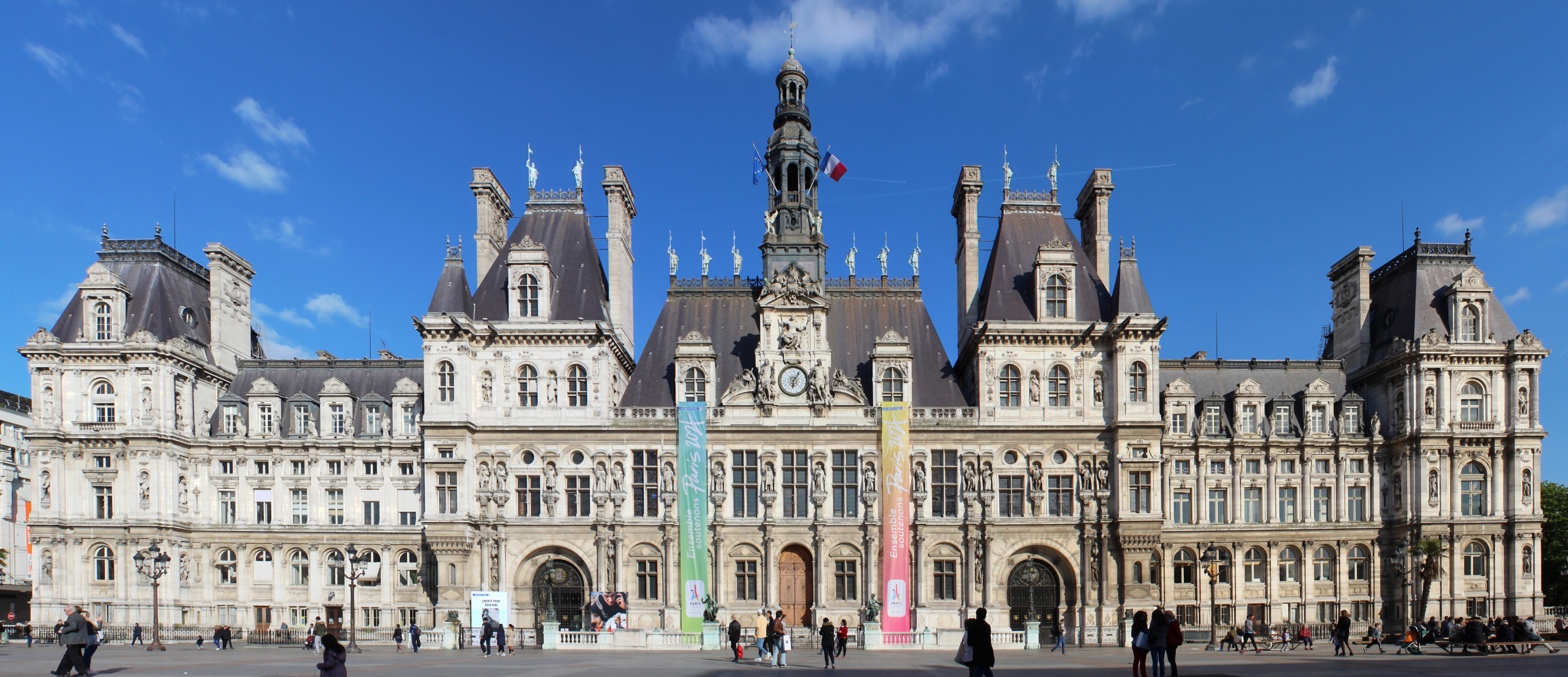
- Main frontage of the Hôtel de Ville in April 2017

General information
- Type: City hall
- Architectural style: Renaissance Revival
- Location: Paris, France
- Coordinates: 48.8564°N 2.3525°E
- Completed: 1357; 1533 (expansion); 1892 (reconstruction)

Height
- Height: 50 metres (160 ft)

Design and construction
- Architects: Théodore Ballu, Édouard Deperthes

Monument historique
- Official name: Hôtel de ville
- Type: Inscrit
- Designated: 1975
- Reference no.: PA00086319

The Hôtel de Ville (French: [otɛl də vil]; French for 'City Hall') is the city hall of Paris, France, standing on the Place de l'Hôtel-de-Ville – Esplanade de la Libération in the 4th arrondissement. The south wing was originally constructed by Francis I beginning in 1535 until 1551. The north wing was built by Henry IV and Louis XIII between 1605 and 1628. It was burned by the Paris Commune, along with all the city archives that it contained, during the Semaine Sanglante, the Commune's final days, in May 1871.

The outside was rebuilt following the original design, but larger, between 1874 and 1882, while the inside was considerably modified. It has been the headquarters of the municipality of Paris since 1357. It serves multiple functions, housing the local government council, since 1977 the mayors of Paris and their cabinets, and also serves as a venue for large receptions. It was designated a monument historique by the French government in 1975.

== History ==
=== The original building ===
In July 1357, Étienne Marcel, provost of the merchants (i.e. mayor) of Paris, bought the so-called maison aux piliers ('House of Pillars') in the name of the municipality on the gently sloping shingle beach which served as a river port for unloading wheat and wood and later merged into a square, the Place de Grève ('Strand Square'), a place where Parisians often gathered, particularly for public executions. Ever since 1357, the City of Paris's administration has been located on the same location where the Hôtel de Ville stands today. Before 1357, the city administration was located in the so-called parloir aux bourgeois ('Parlour of Burgesses') near the Châtelet.

In 1533, King Francis I decided to endow Paris with a city hall which would be worthy of his capital, then the largest city of Europe and Christendom. He appointed two architects: Italian Dominique de Cortone, nicknamed Boccador because of his red beard, and Frenchman Pierre Chambiges. The House of Pillars was torn down and Boccador, steeped in the spirit of the Renaissance, drew up the plans of a building which was at the same time tall, spacious, full of light and refined. Building work was not finished until 1628 during the reign of Louis XIII.

During the next two centuries, no changes were made to the edifice which was the stage for several famous events during the French Revolution. On 14 July 1789, the last provost of the merchants Jacques de Flesselles was murdered by an angry crowd. On 27 July 1794, Maximilien Robespierre attempted to commit suicide following a coup and was arrested along with his followers.

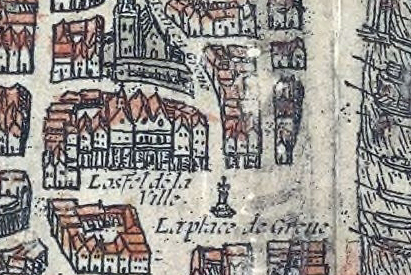
Former Hôtel de Ville, begun in 1533 (plan by Braun and Hogenberg, c. 1530)

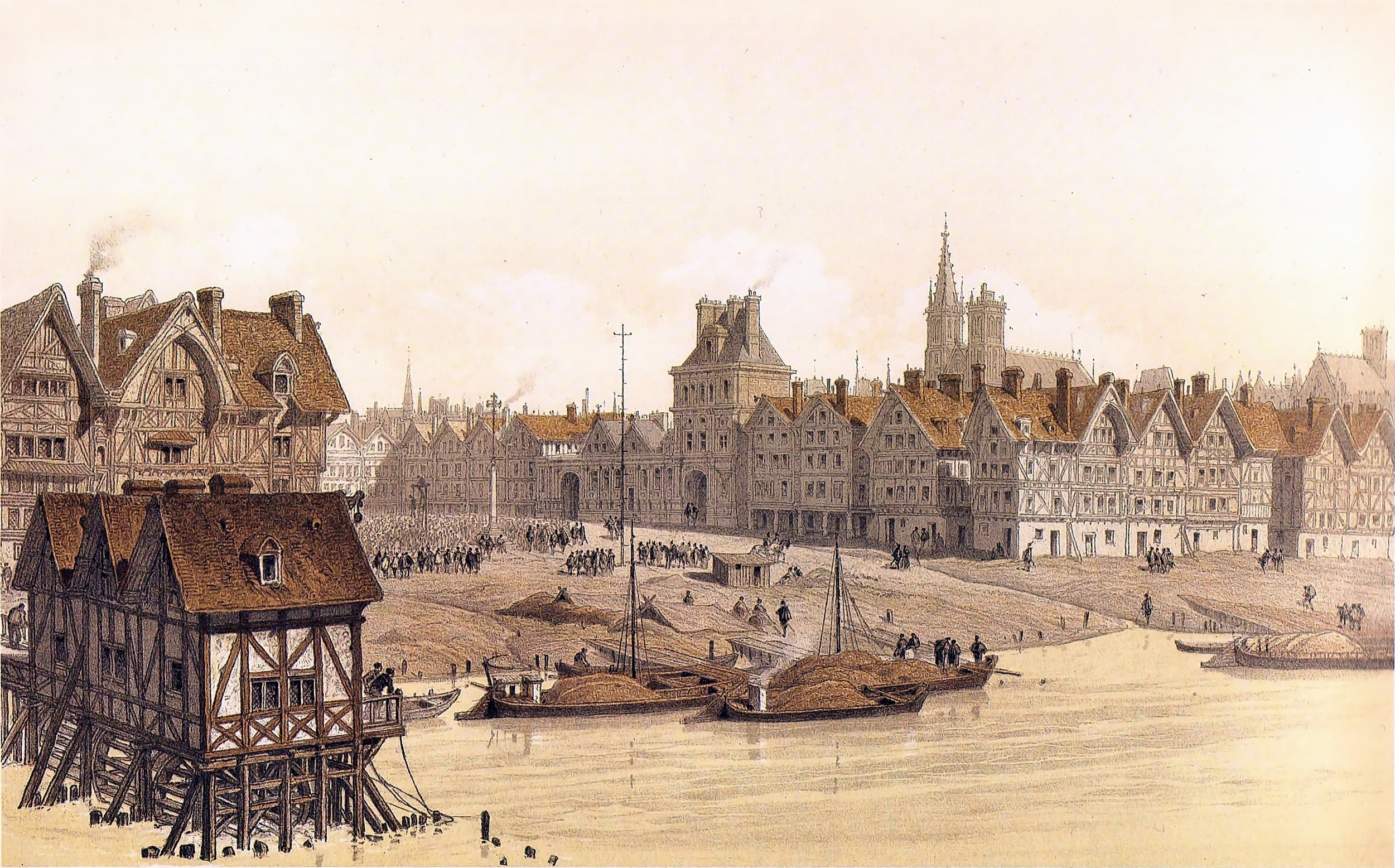
Engraving by Theodor Josef Hubert Hoffbauer (1885) showing how he envisioned the Hôtel de Ville in 1583

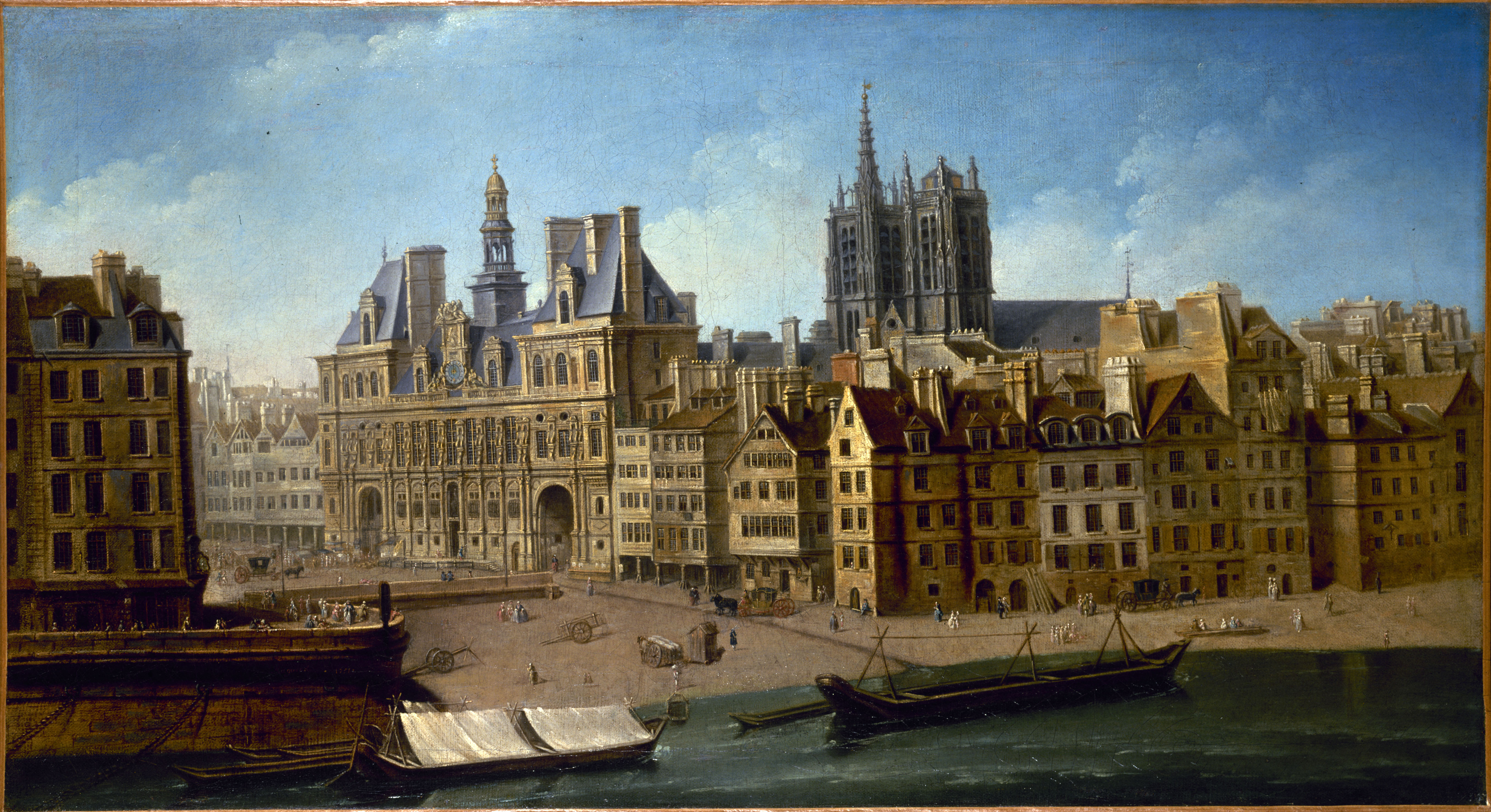
The Hôtel de Ville and the Place de Grève, Nicolas-Jean-Baptiste Raguenet, c. 1753

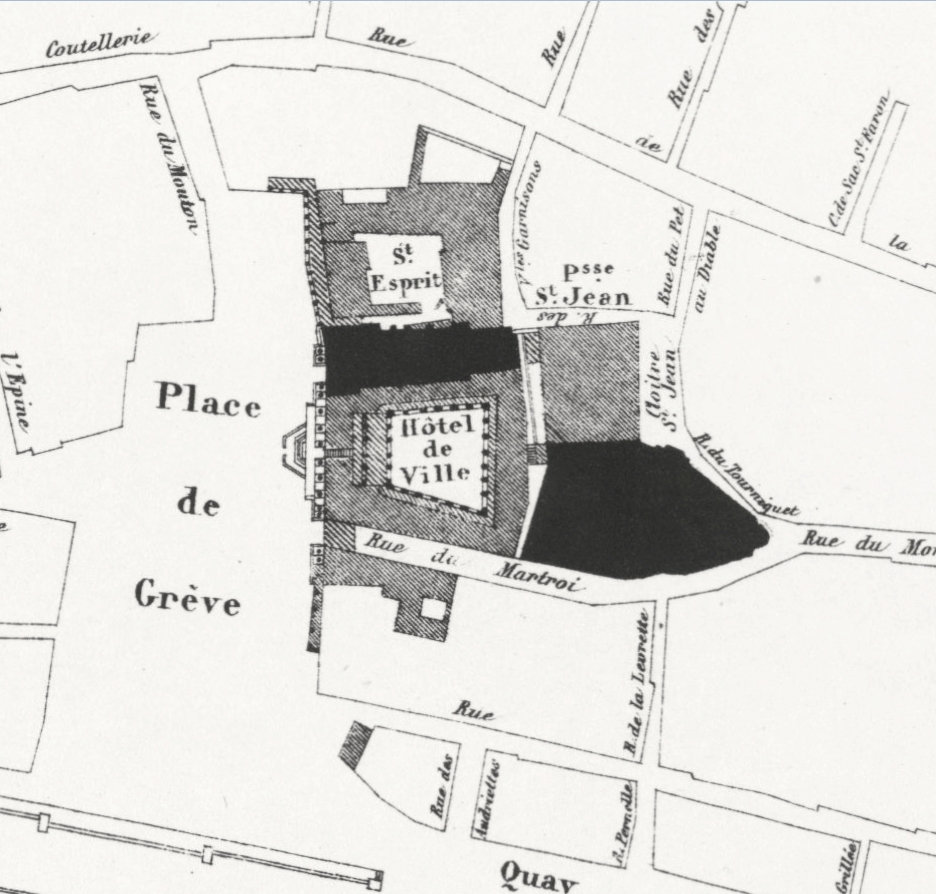
The Hôtel de Ville on the Verniquet atlas, 1780s

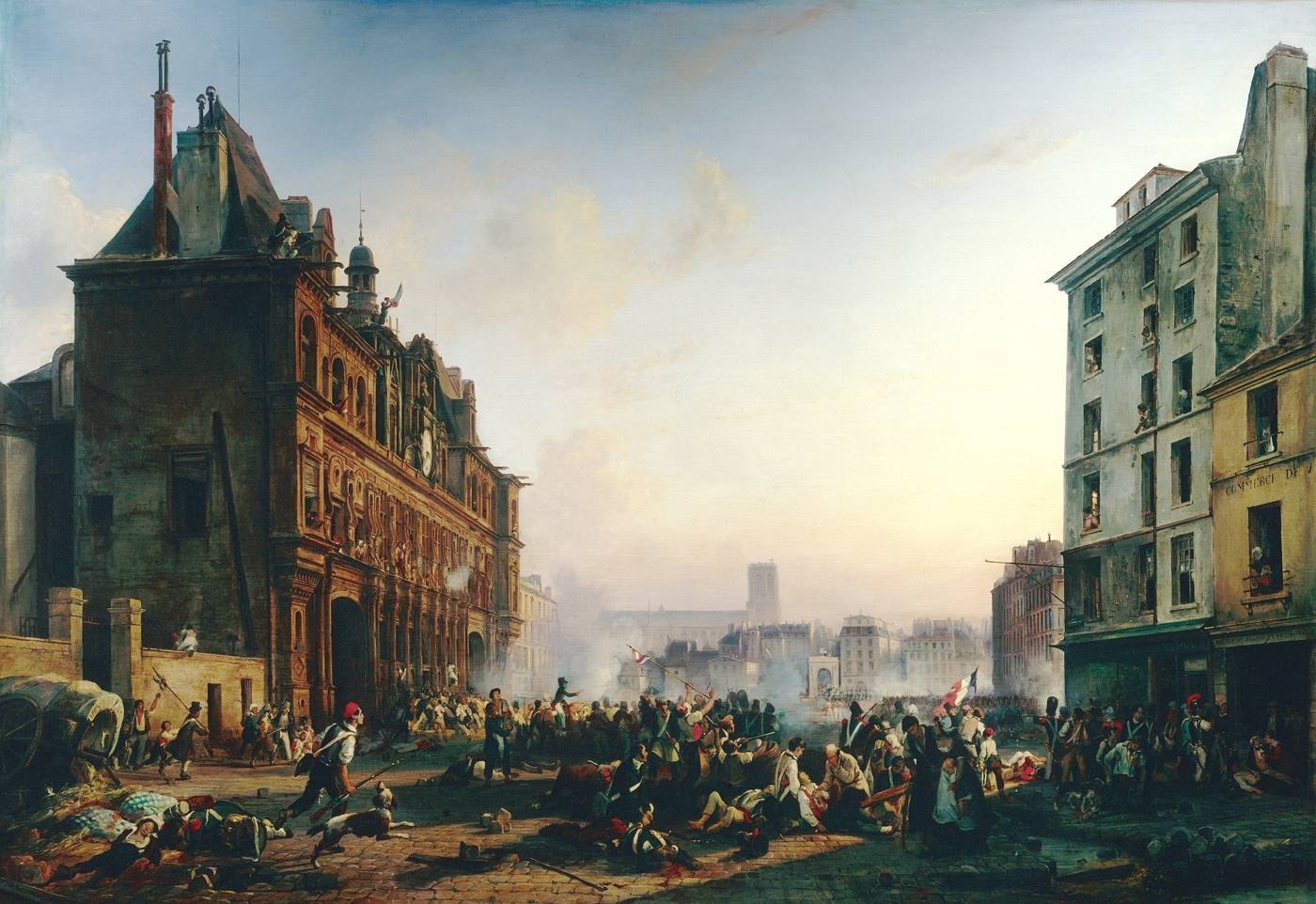
Events at the Hôtel de Ville (left) during the July Revolution. The Attack on the City Hall of Paris by Joseph Beaume. Two wings were built a few years later.

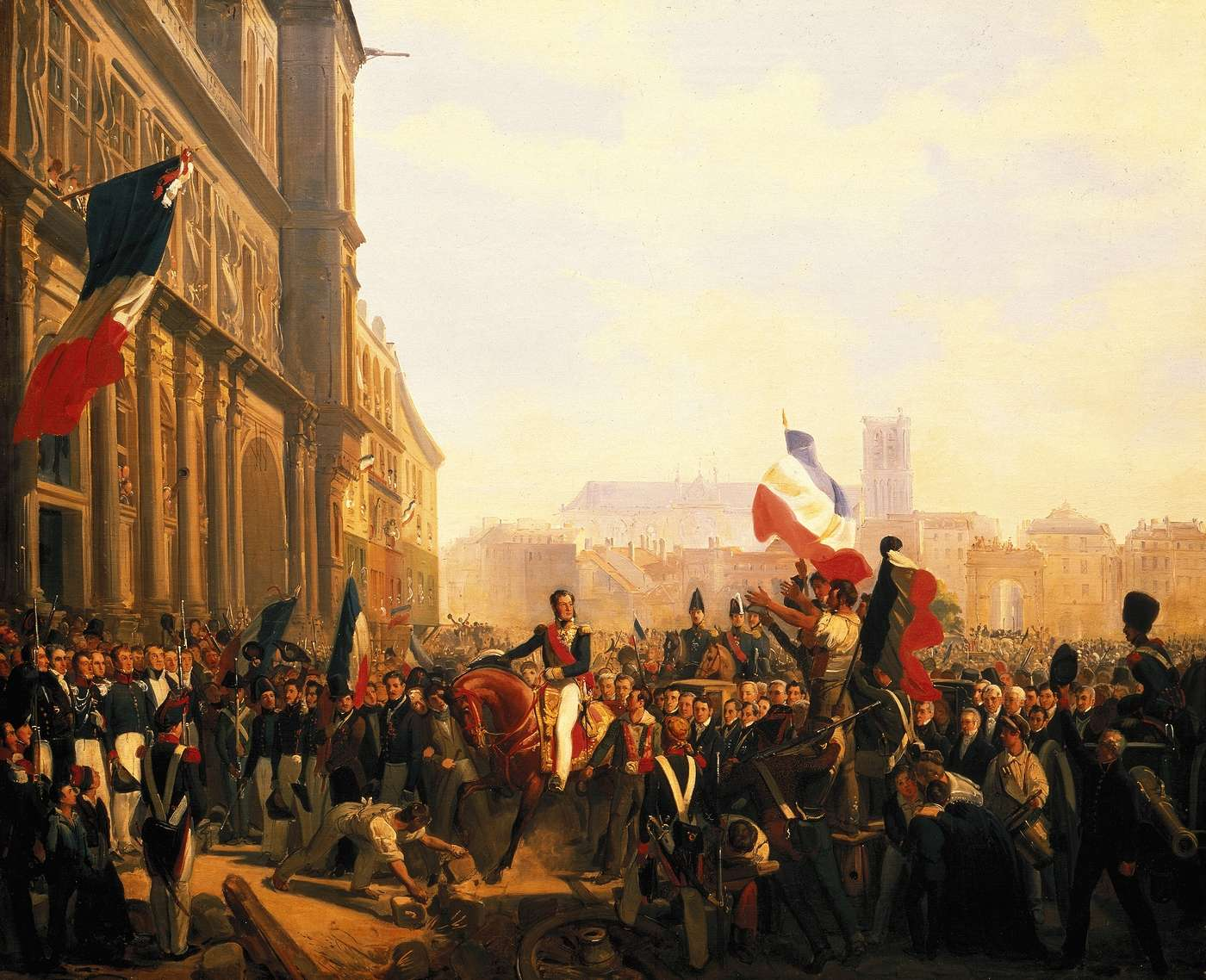
The Arrival of the Duke of Orleans at the Hôtel de Ville by Charles-Philippe Larivière, 1837

=== 19th-century additions ===
From 1834, the Hôtel de Ville became the seat of the Paris municipal council. In 1835, on the initiative of Claude-Philibert Barthelot, comte de Rambuteau, préfet of the Seine département, two wings were added to the main building and were linked to the façade by a gallery, to provide more space for the expanded city government. The architects were Étienne-Hippolyte Godde and Jean-Baptiste Lesueur.

Under the Second Empire, the Hôtel de Ville was used by the new regime to showcase its power. In 1852, during the plebiscite in favor of Napoleon III, the Hôtel was decorated with the colors of the Emperor and the imperial proclamation was made there. It also became the seat of the Prefecture, in addition to hosting major celebrations such as the visit of Queen Victoria in 1855. To clear its access, Haussmann had nine streets razed to create the Avenue Victoria.

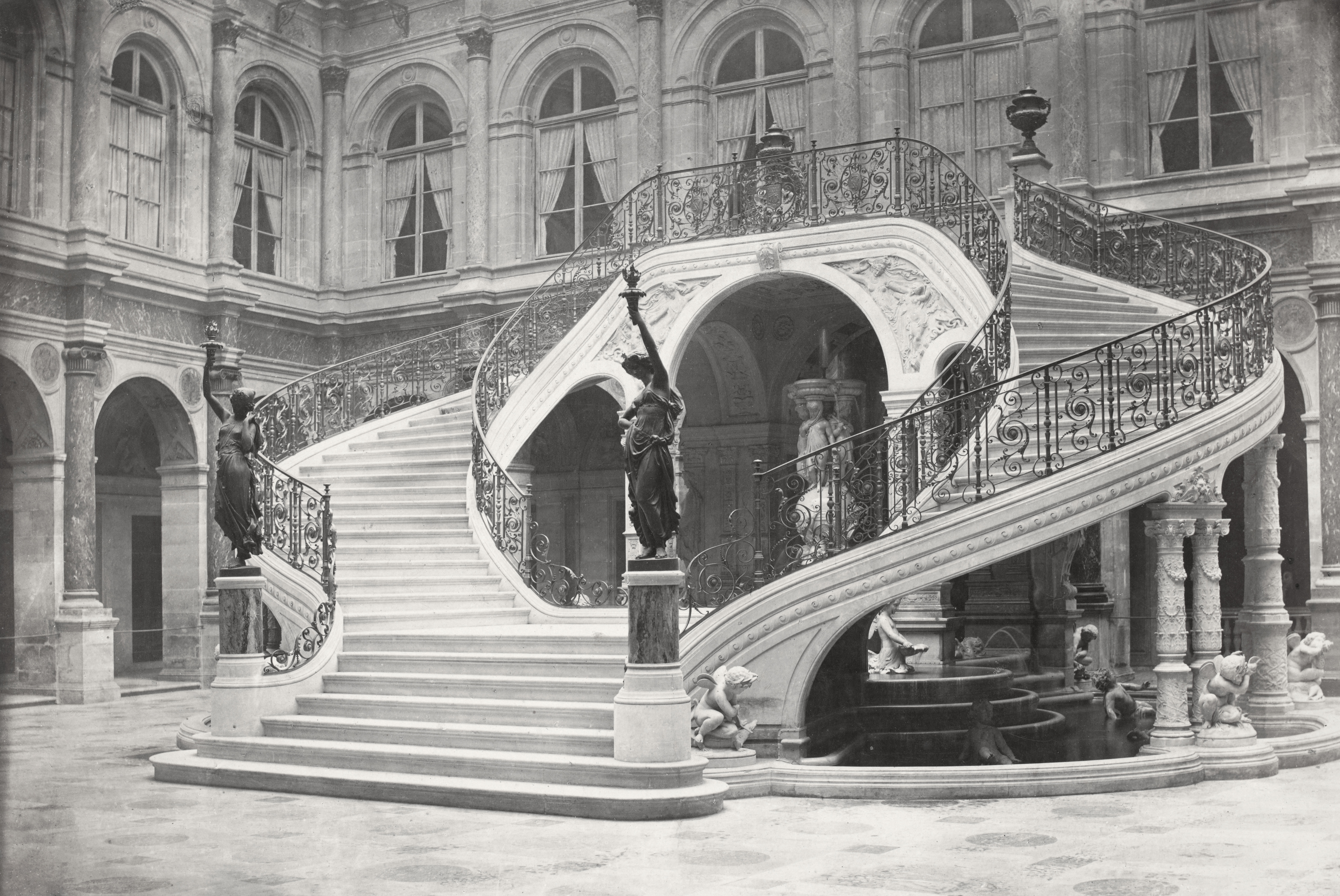
The old staircase, c. 1853

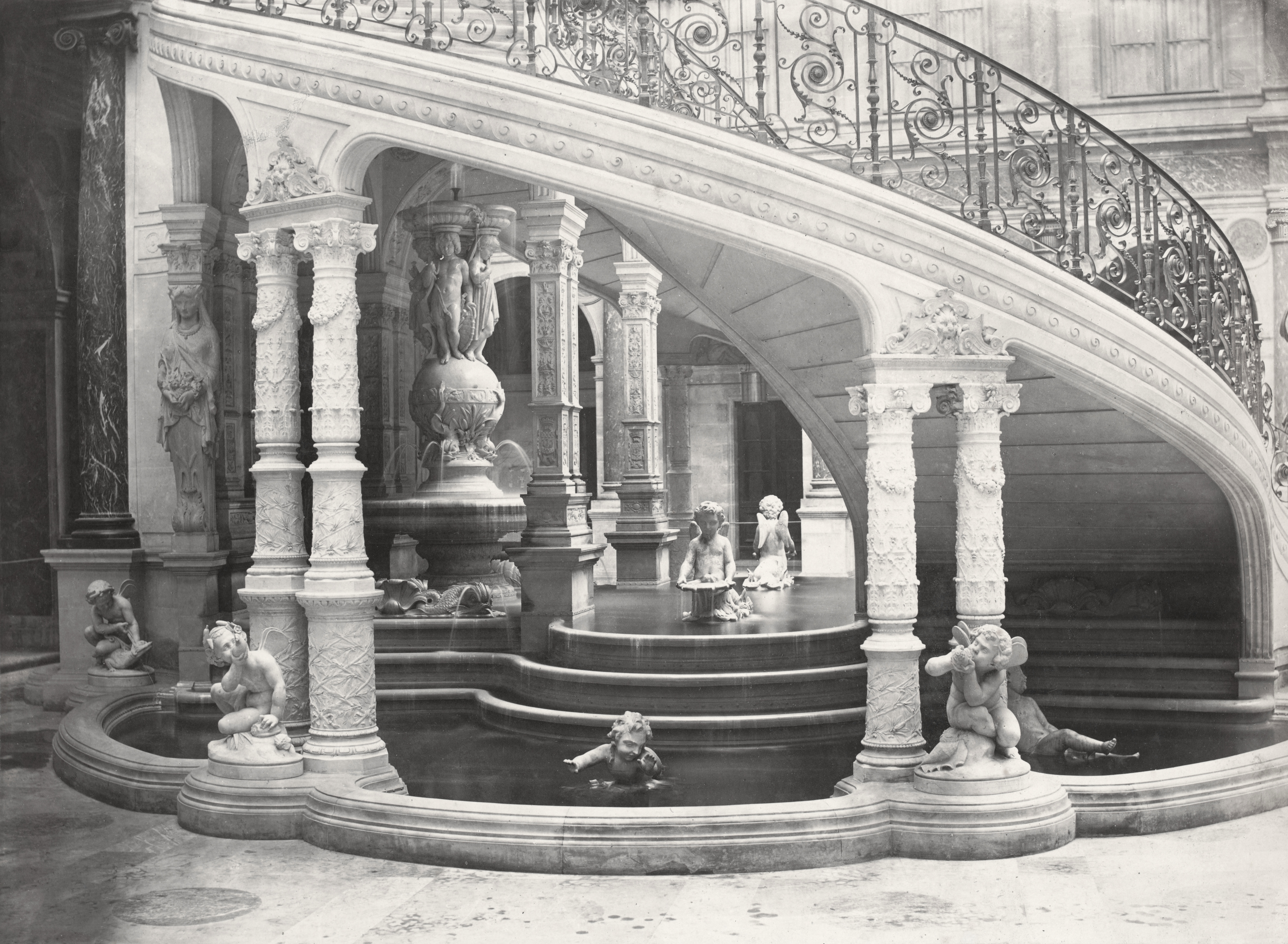
Detail of the old staircase, c. 1853

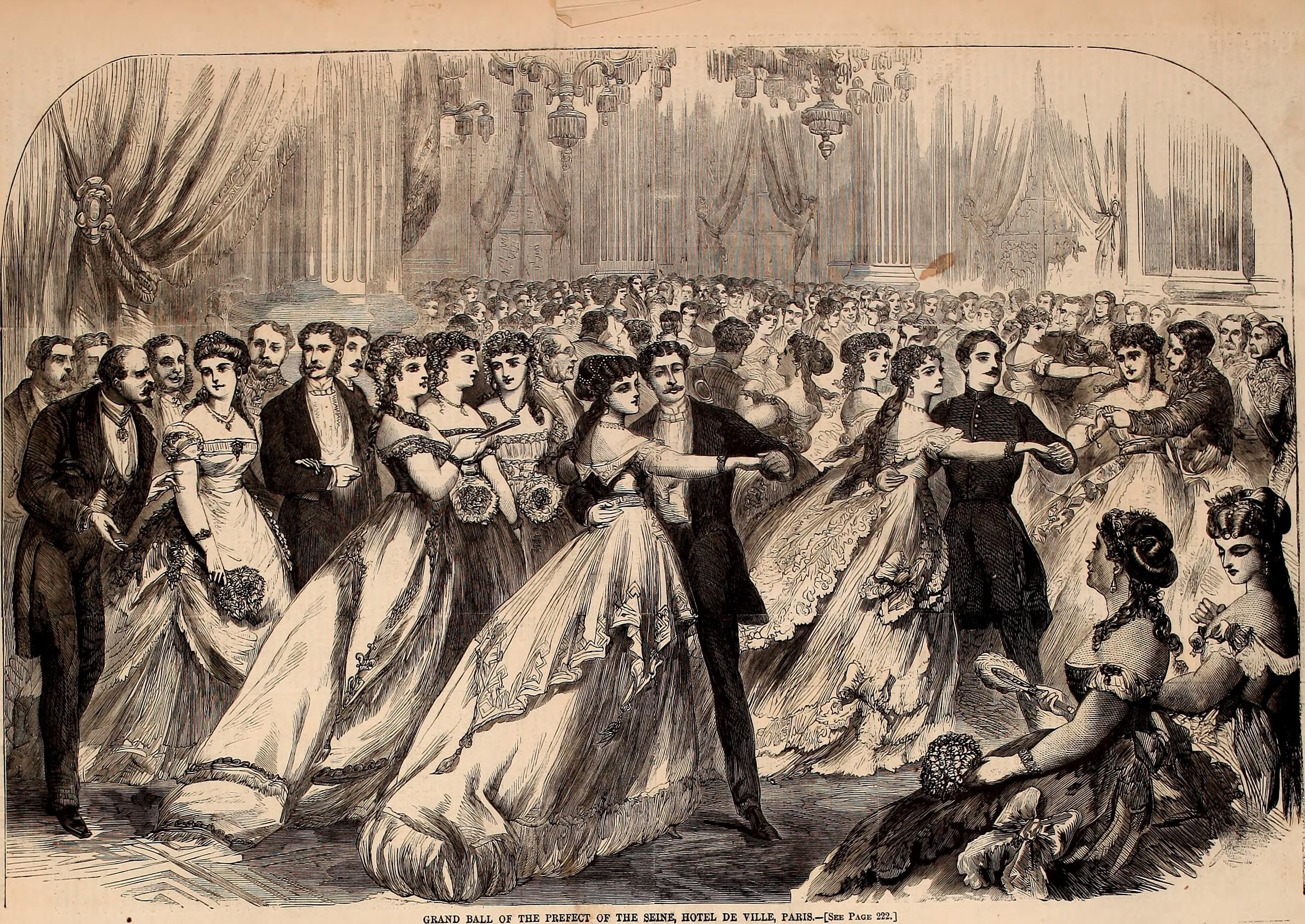
Grand ball of the Prefect of the Seine in 1857

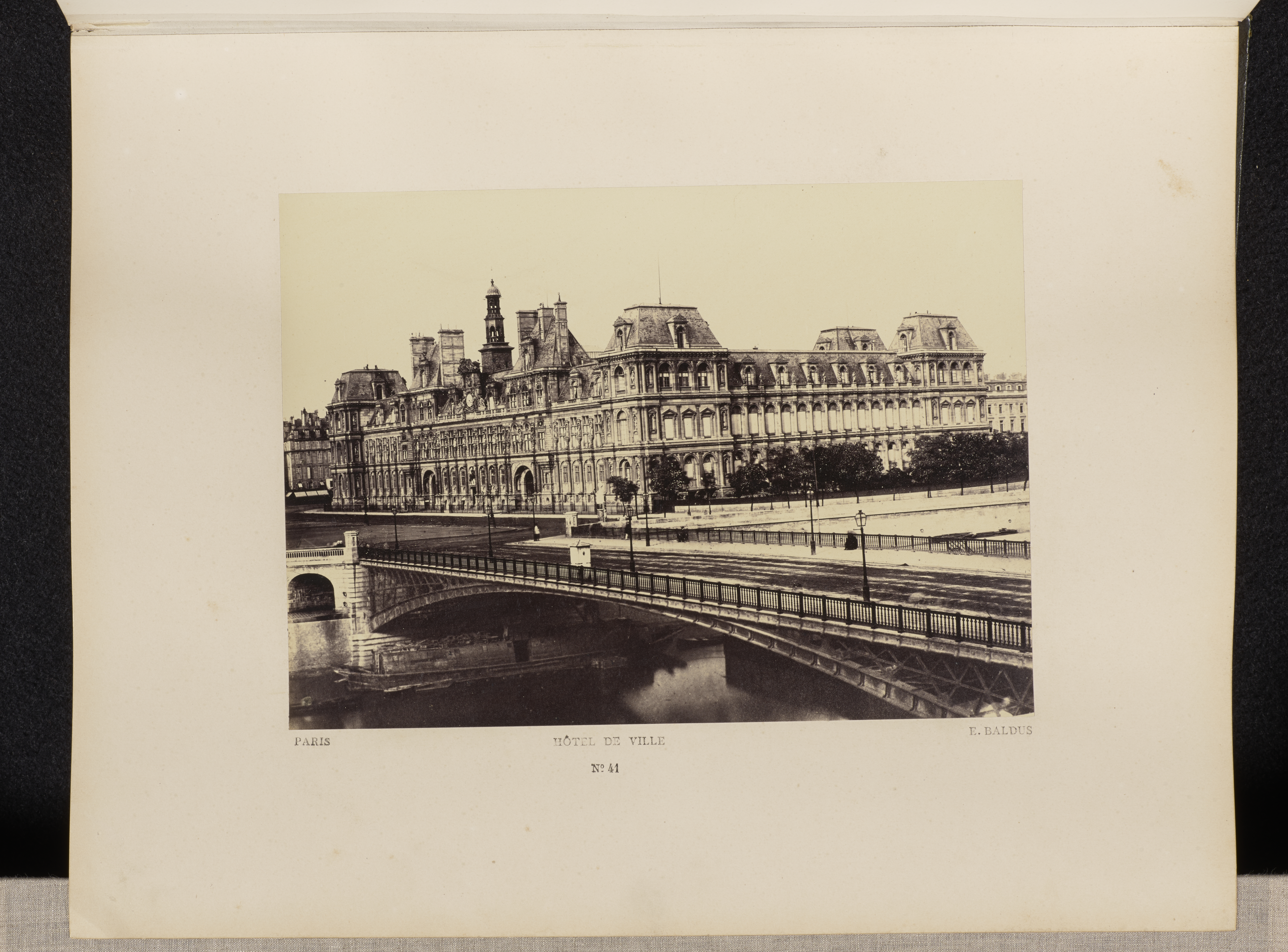
The Hôtel de Ville in the 1860s, photograph by Édouard Baldus

=== The Paris Commune ===
During the Franco-Prussian War, the building played a key role in several political events. On 30 October 1870, revolutionaries broke into the building and captured some of the members of the Government of National Defence, while making repeated demands for the establishment of a communard government. The existing government escaped via a tunnel built in 1807, which still connects the Hôtel de Ville with a nearby barracks. On 23 January 1871, crowds gathered outside the building to protest against speculated surrender to the Prussians, and were dispersed by soldiers firing from the building, who inflicted several casualties.

The Hôtel de Ville had been the headquarters of the French Revolution, and likewise, it was the headquarters of the Paris Commune. On 23 and 24 May 1871, when defeat became increasingly imminent and the French army approached the building, the Communards set fire to the Hôtel de Ville, along with other government buildings, destroying it and almost all of the city archives prior to 1860.

Already, early that morning, the Commune added to the flames one of the finest and most historic buildings of all Paris – the Hôtel de Ville itself. At 8 a.m. some fifteen members met there to discuss its immediate evacuation, and only Delescluze and one other had protested. In its despair, a scorched-earth policy had now become the retreating Communard's automatic response, and by 11 a.m. the Hôtel de Ville was a sea of flames.

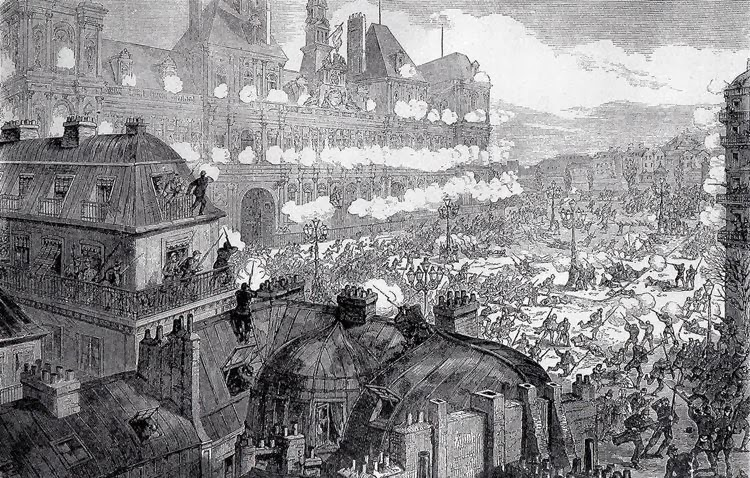
Uprising of 22 January 1871 at the Hôtel de Ville

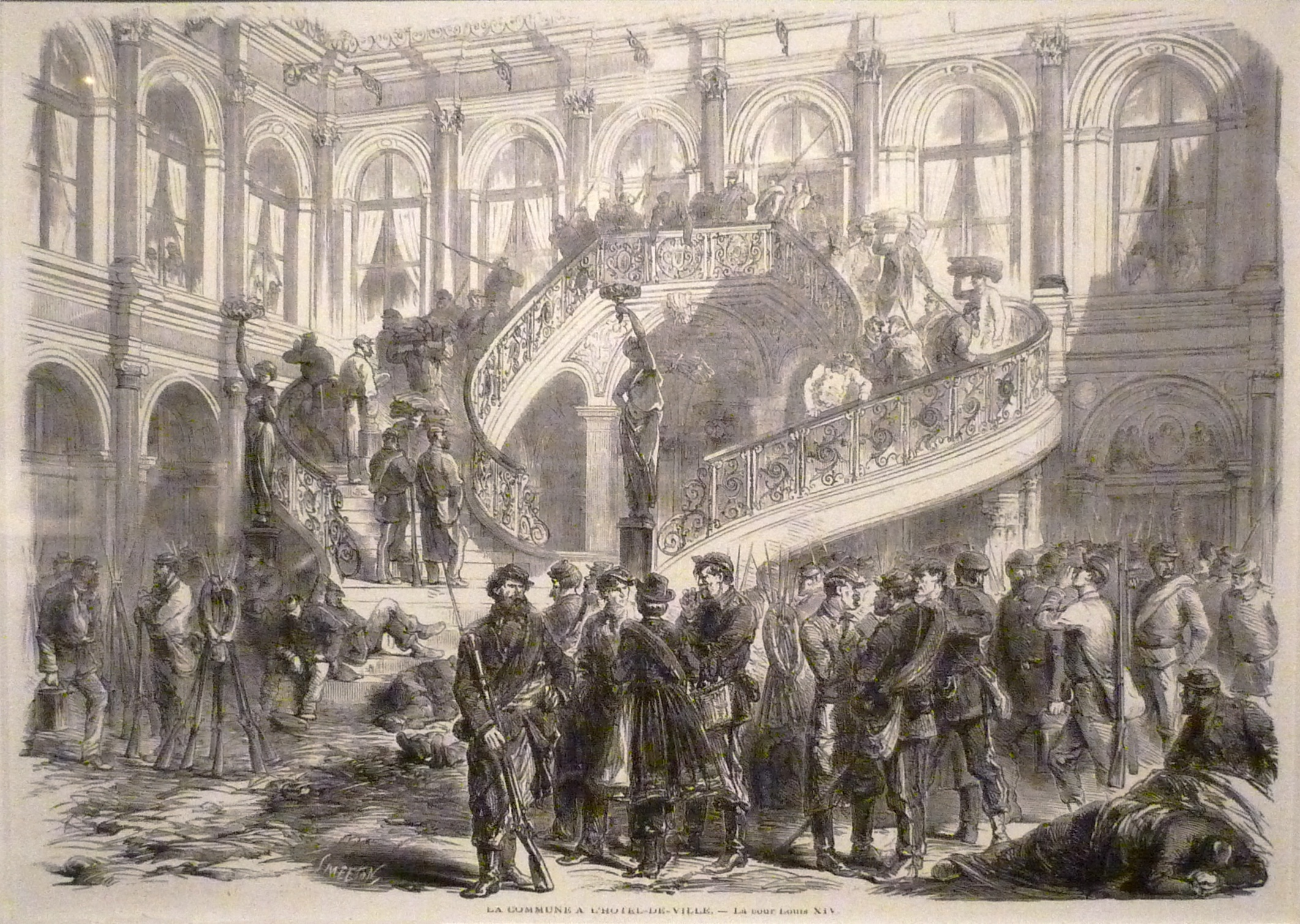
National Guards in the Louis XIV courtyard, engraving from L'Illustration, 1871

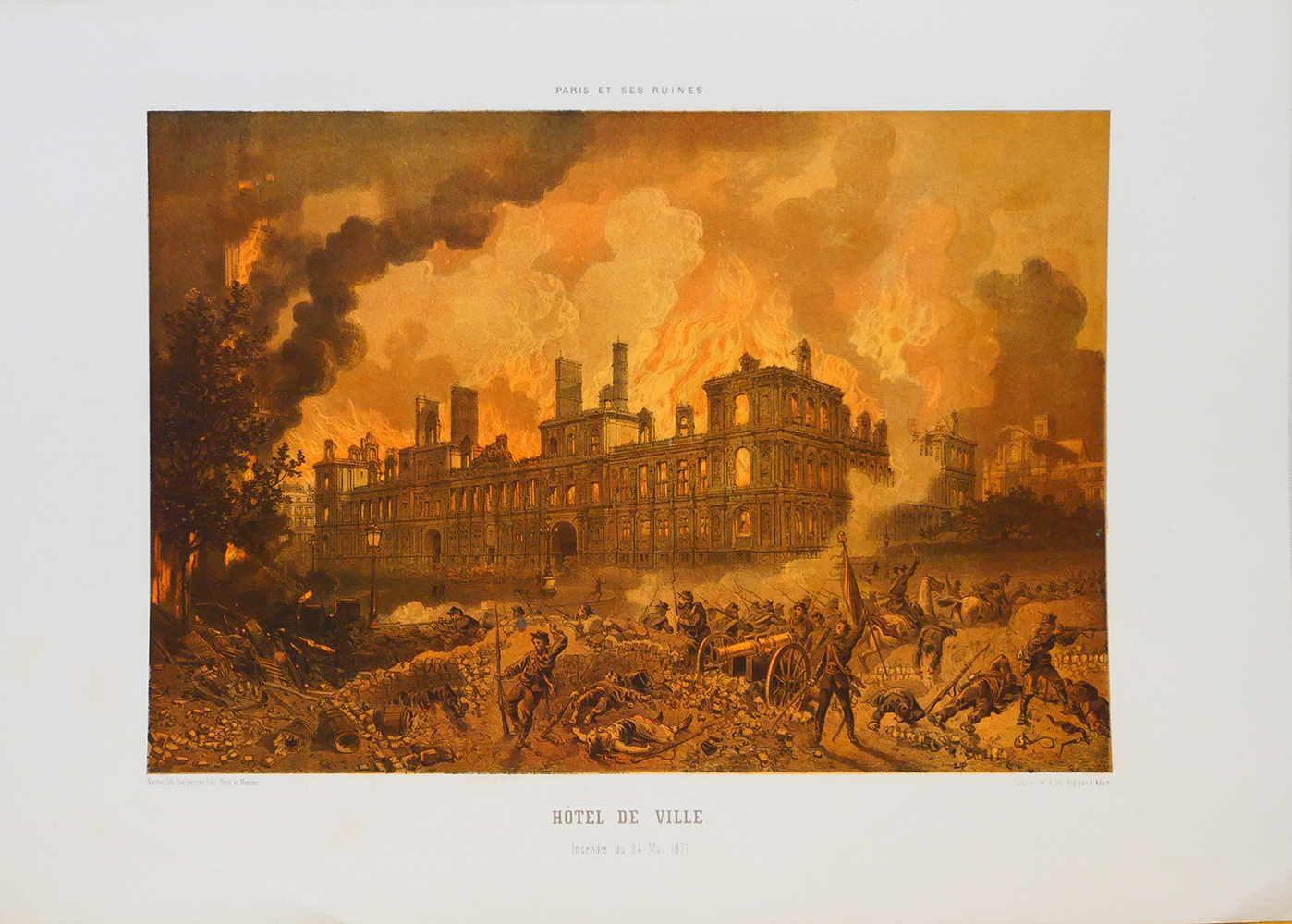
Burning of the Hôtel de Ville by Paris Commune, 23–24 May 1871

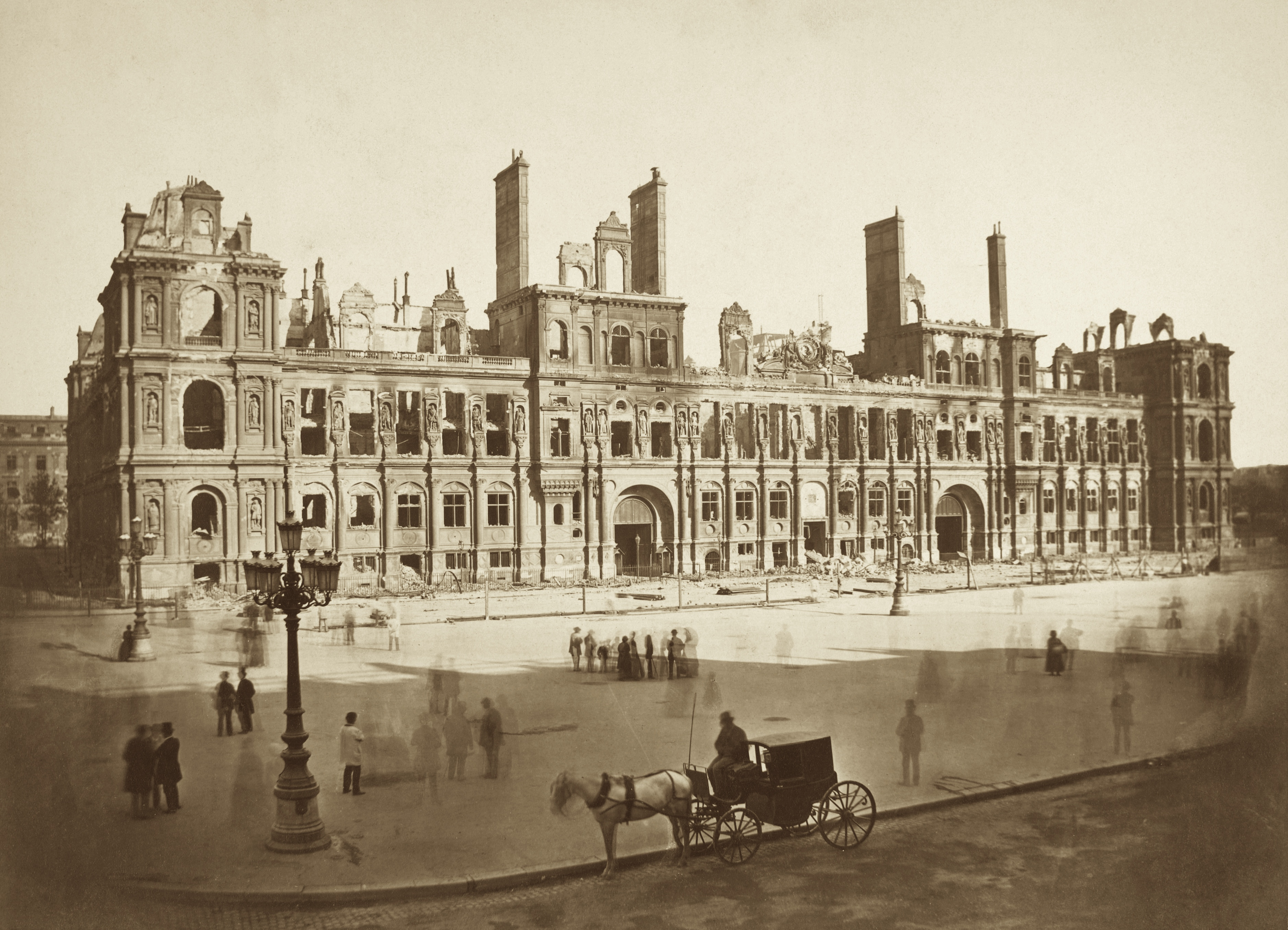
Hôtel de Ville after the Paris Commune, photograph by Auguste Hippolyte Collard, 1871

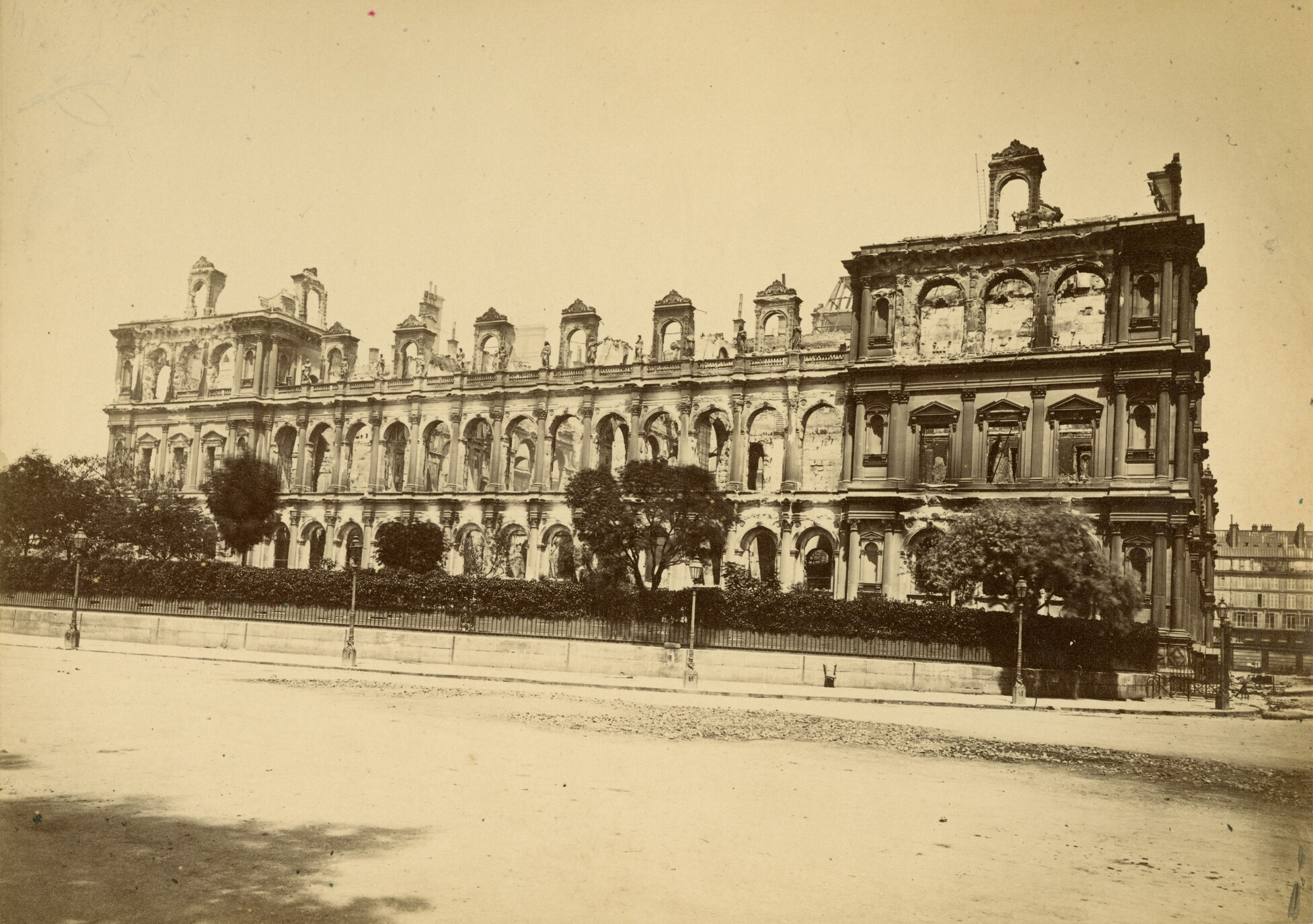
Hôtel de Ville with Commune damage, photograph by Alphonse Liebert, 1871

=== Reconstruction ===
Reconstruction of City Hall lasted from 1873 through 1892 (19 years) and was directed by architects Théodore Ballu and Édouard Deperthes, who had won the public competition for the building's reconstruction. The plan entailed the removal of the ruins, and the construction of a completely new building, with a central façade replicating the original 16th-century French Renaissance building. The side wings replicated those of the 1830-40s, but wider. The building was 50 metres (160 ft) high at its highest point.

Behind the façades, the interior was based on an entirely new design, with ceremonial rooms lavishly decorated in the 1880s style. Ballu also designed the Church of the Holy Trinity in the 9th arrondissement and the belfry of the town hall of the 1st arrondissement, opposite the Louvre's east façade. He also restored the Saint-Jacques Tower, a Gothic church tower in a square 150 metres (490 ft) to the west of the Hôtel de Ville.

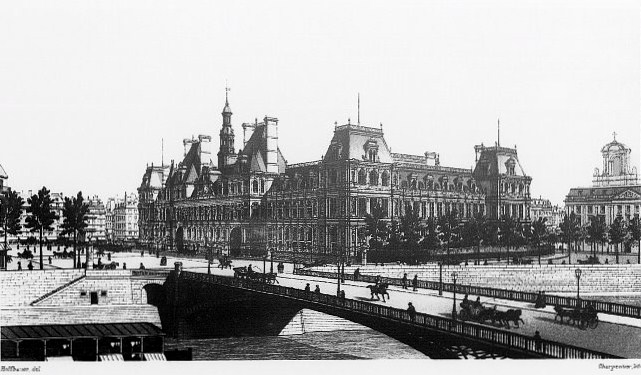
At turn of the century, rebuilt in the 1870s in its original French Renaissance style inspired by the Châteaux of the Loire Valley

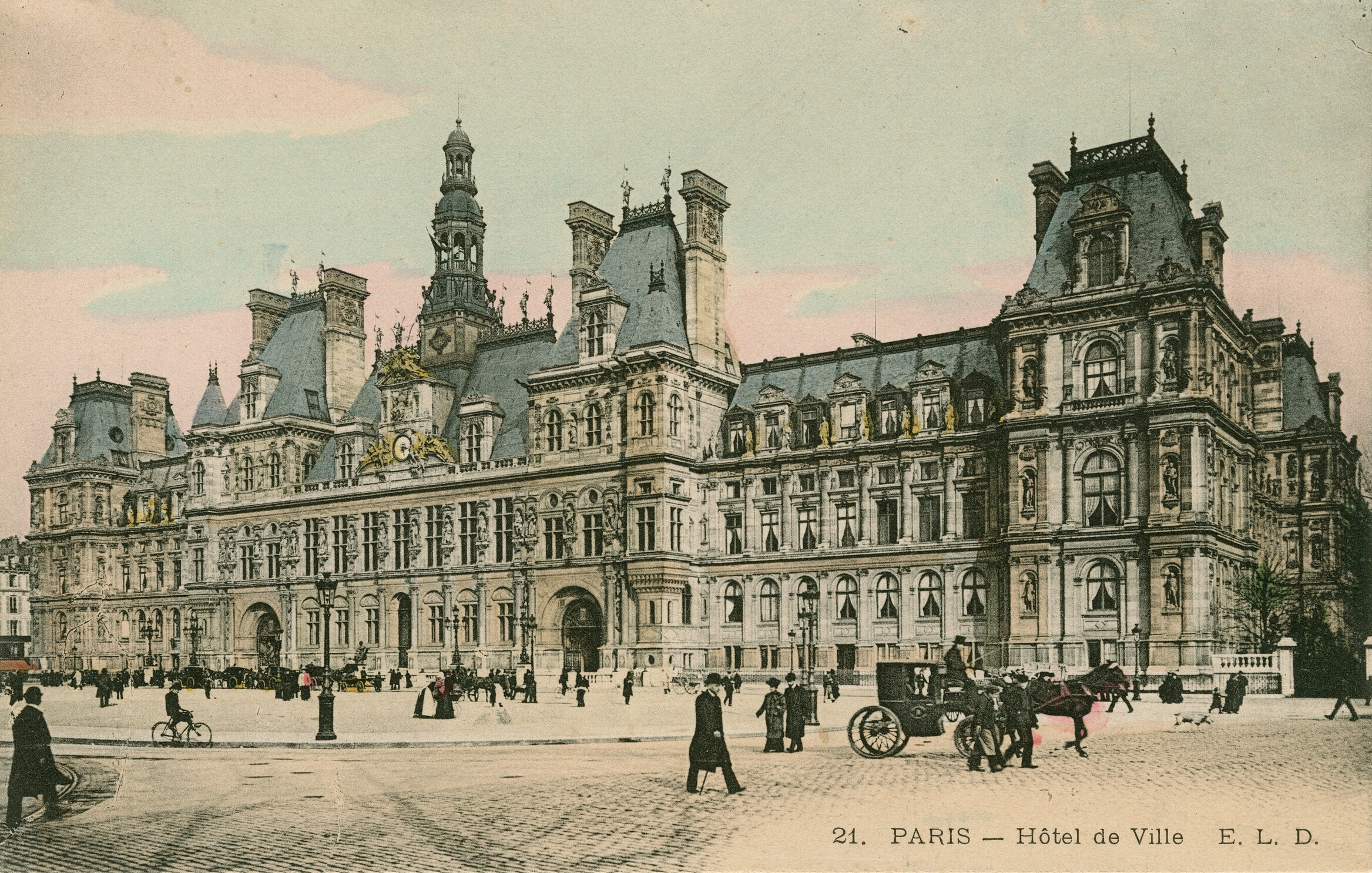
Colored postcard of the rebuilt Hôtel de Ville, late 19th century

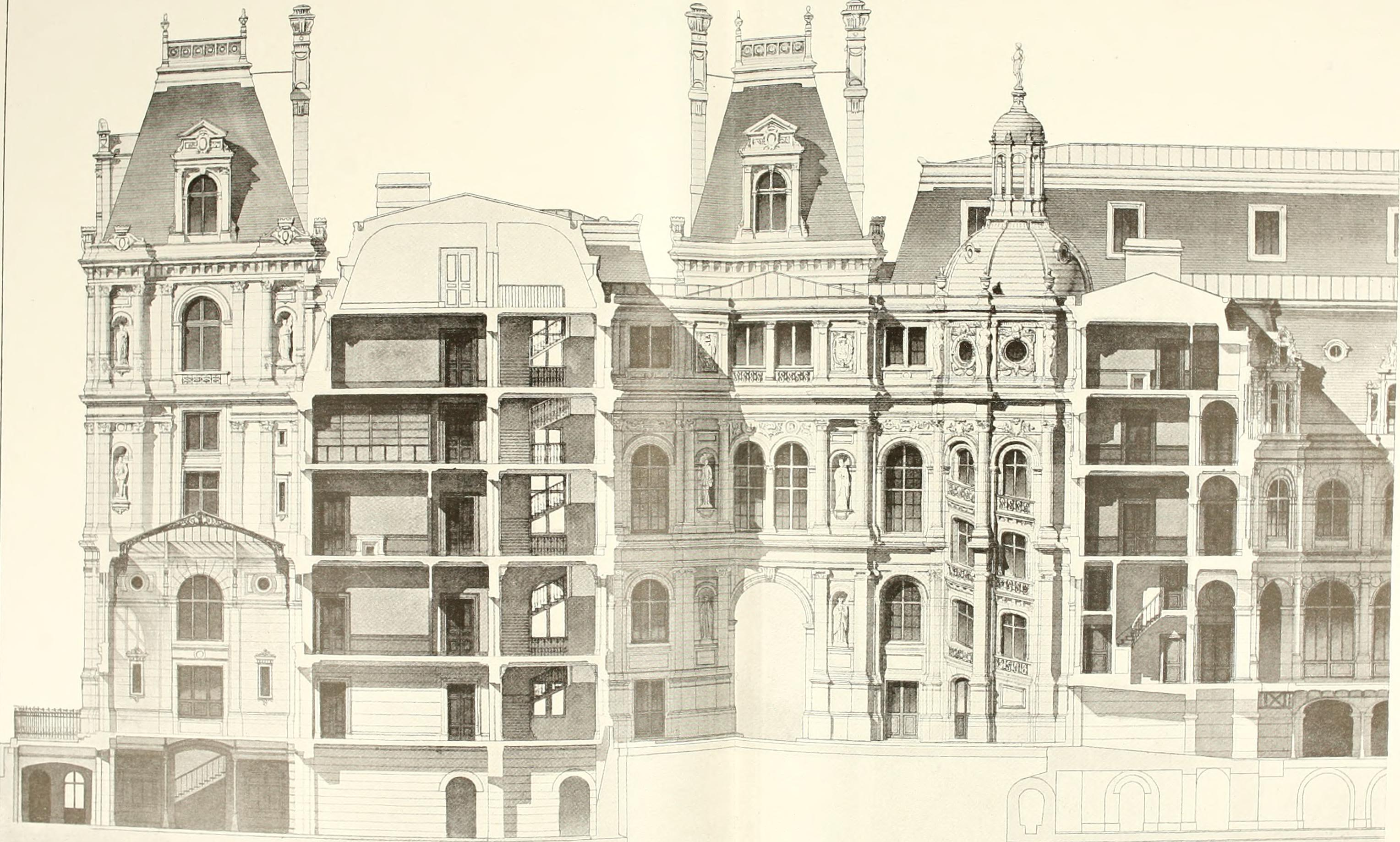
Cross section of the building, c. 1900

=== Later events ===
Since the French Revolution, the building has been the scene of a number of historical events, notably the proclamation of the French Third Republic in 1870.

Following the liberation of Paris by the French 2nd Armoured Division on 25 August 1944, the chairman of the Provisional Government of the French Republic, General Charles de Gaulle, gave a speech from a window of the town hall, in which he declared: "Paris! Paris outraged! Paris broken! Paris martyred! But Paris liberated!"

In 2002 the mayor, Bertrand Delanoë, a socialist and the city's first openly gay leader, was stabbed during the first all-night, citywide Nuit Blanche (literally, 'White Night') festival when the doors of the long-inaccessible building were thrown open to the public. But Delanoë recovered and did not lose his zeal for access, later converting the mayor's sumptuous private apartments into a crèche (day nursery) for the children of municipal workers.

During the 2024 Summer Olympics, the men's and women's marathons started at the Hôtel de Ville.

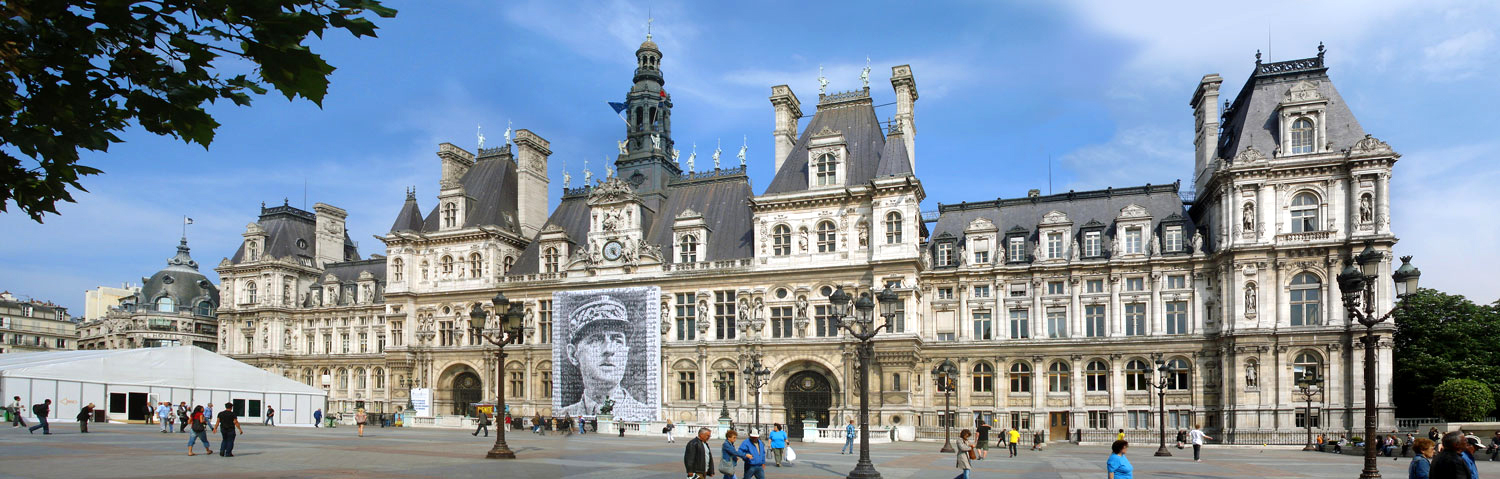
Hôtel de Ville of Paris, featuring a portrait of Charles de Gaulle

== Architecture ==
The main façade, 143 metres (469 ft) long and 18.8 metres (62 ft) high (26.8 metres (88 ft) for the corner pavilions and 50 metres (160 ft) for the bell tower), includes a central avant-corps corresponding to the old monument built during the Renaissance. It rises at its ends in two pavilions, each flanked by a square corbelled turret, through which two gates leading to the courtyards are pierced, closed by wrought iron gates, bearing the coat of arms of the City of Paris.

This central body and its two pavilions are enlarged on either side by a small wing set back six metres, ending with a corner pavilion. On the ground and first floors, each bay features semi-circular and rectangular windows topped by mezzanines, framed by pilasters and columns.

The next floor of the intermediate façade features an attic pierced with stone dormers that enclose a rectangular bay. The pavilion floor is different, with a central bay comprising a semicircular bay preceded by a balustraded balcony, and two side bays adorned with niches and statues. This floor is surmounted by a Mansard roof crowned by an open gallery with corner pedestals supporting flame vases.

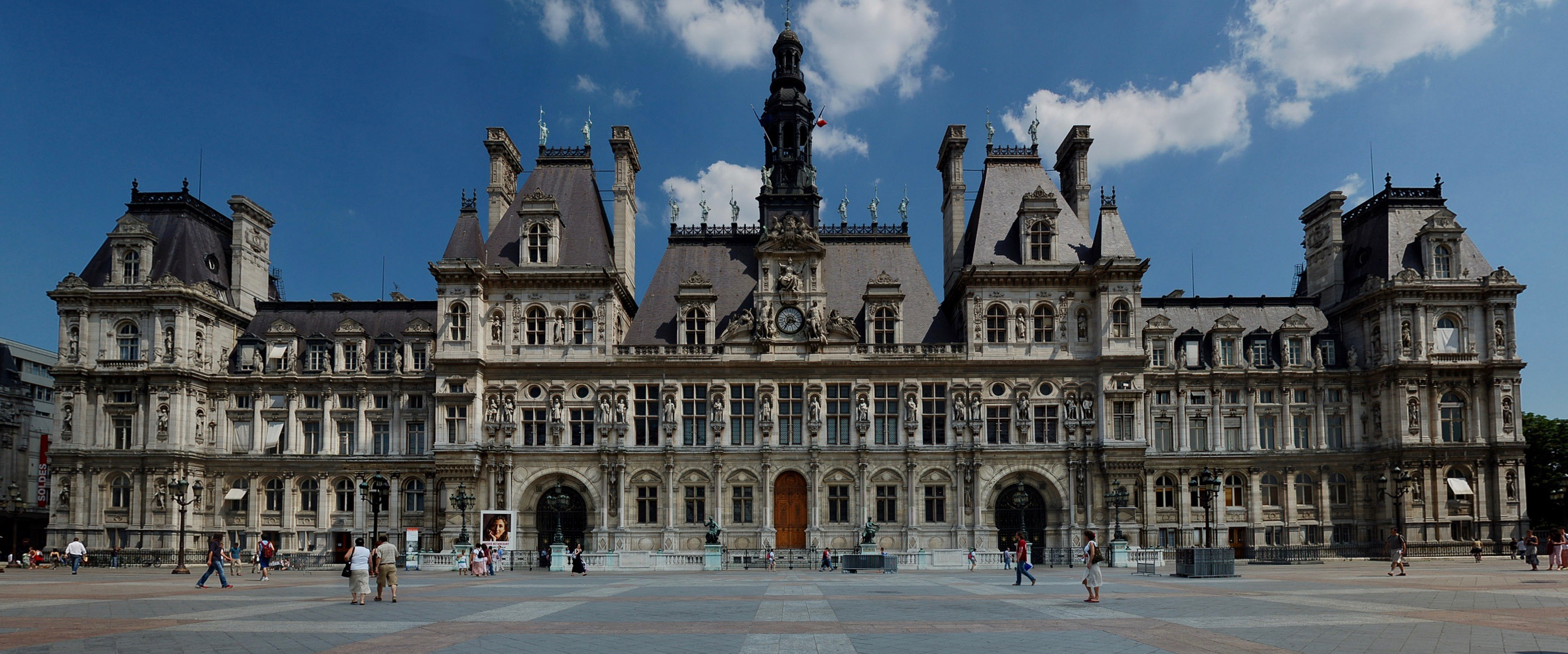
West (main) façade

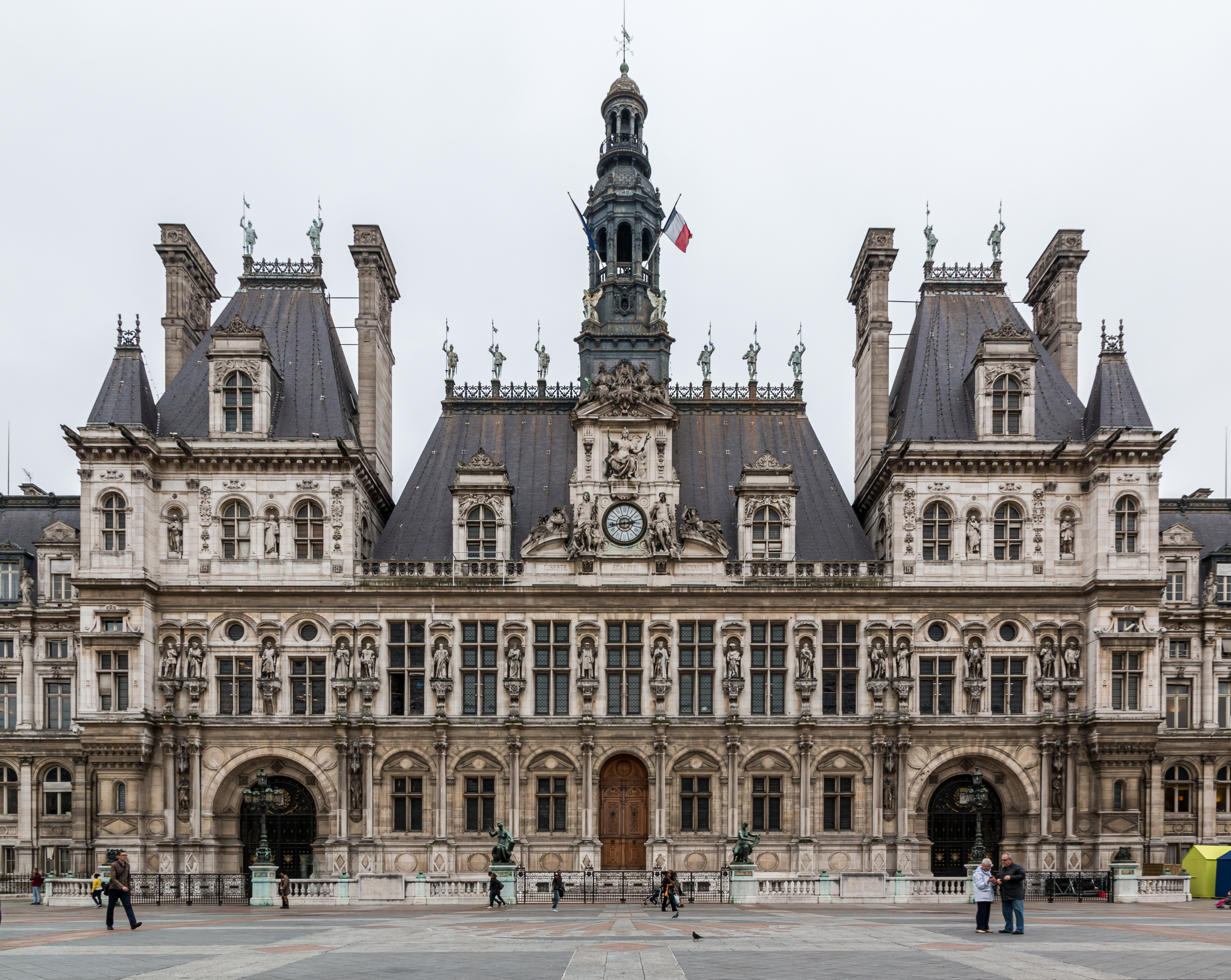
West façade (detail)

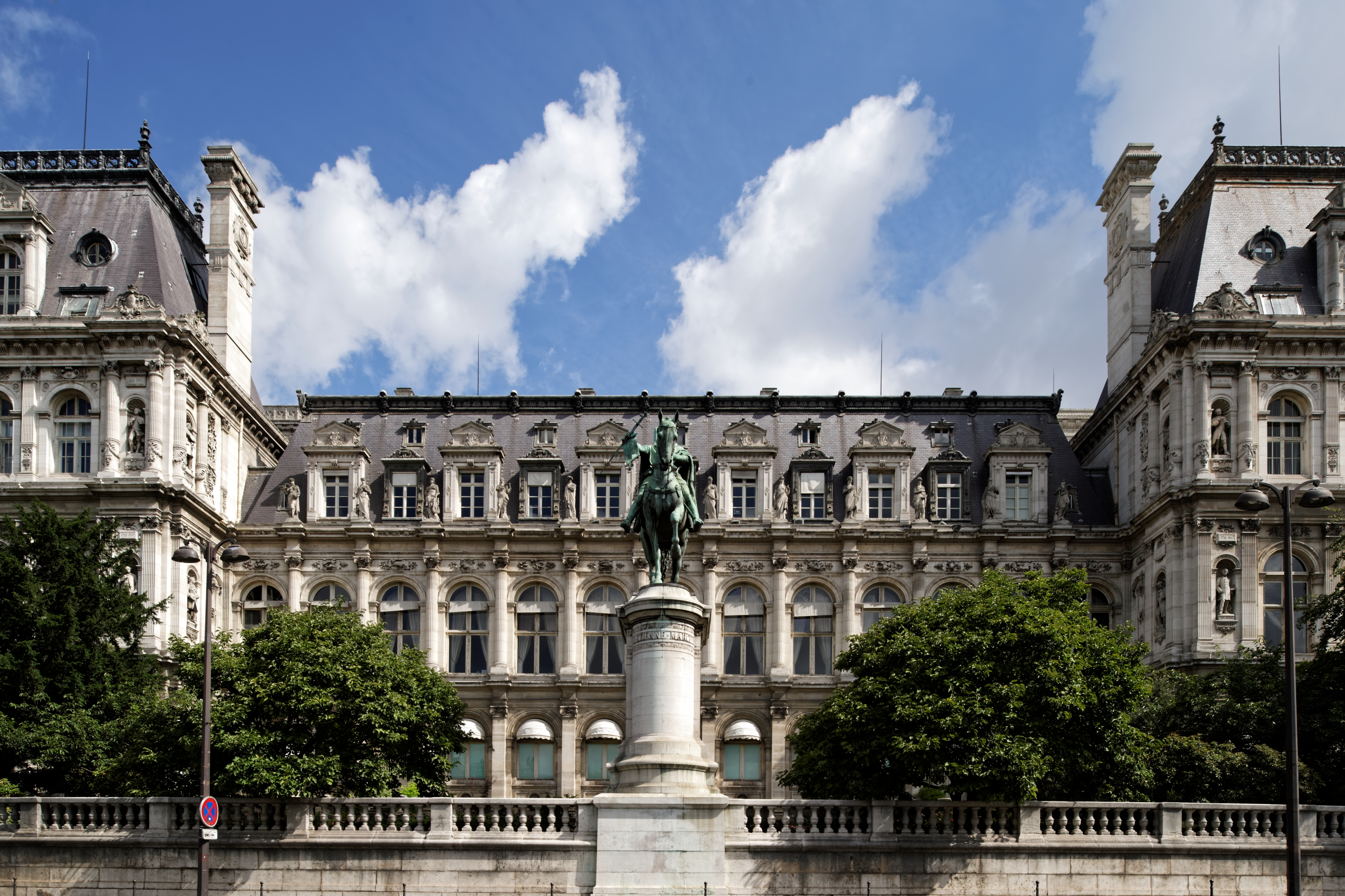
South façade

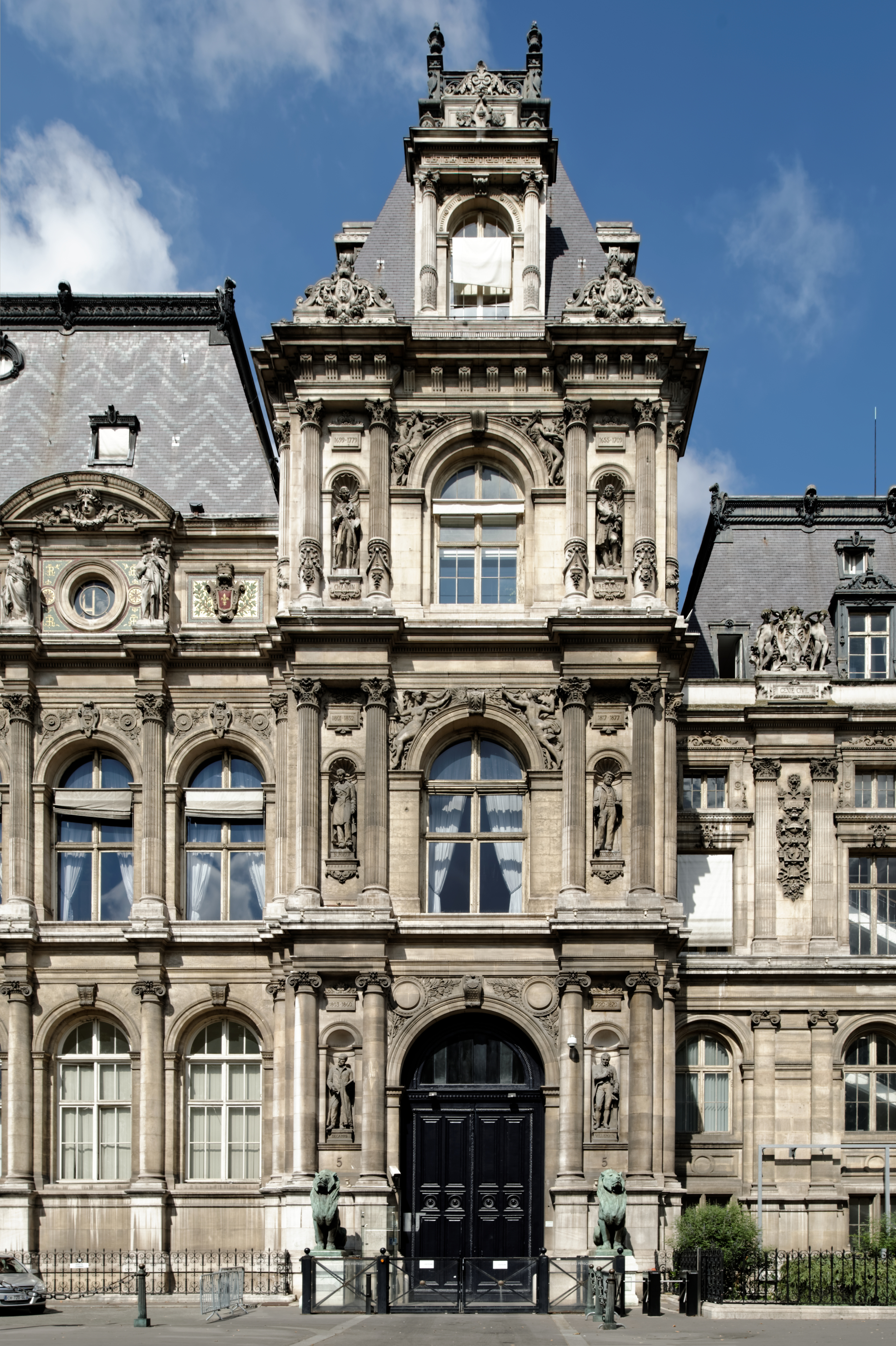
East façade (detail)

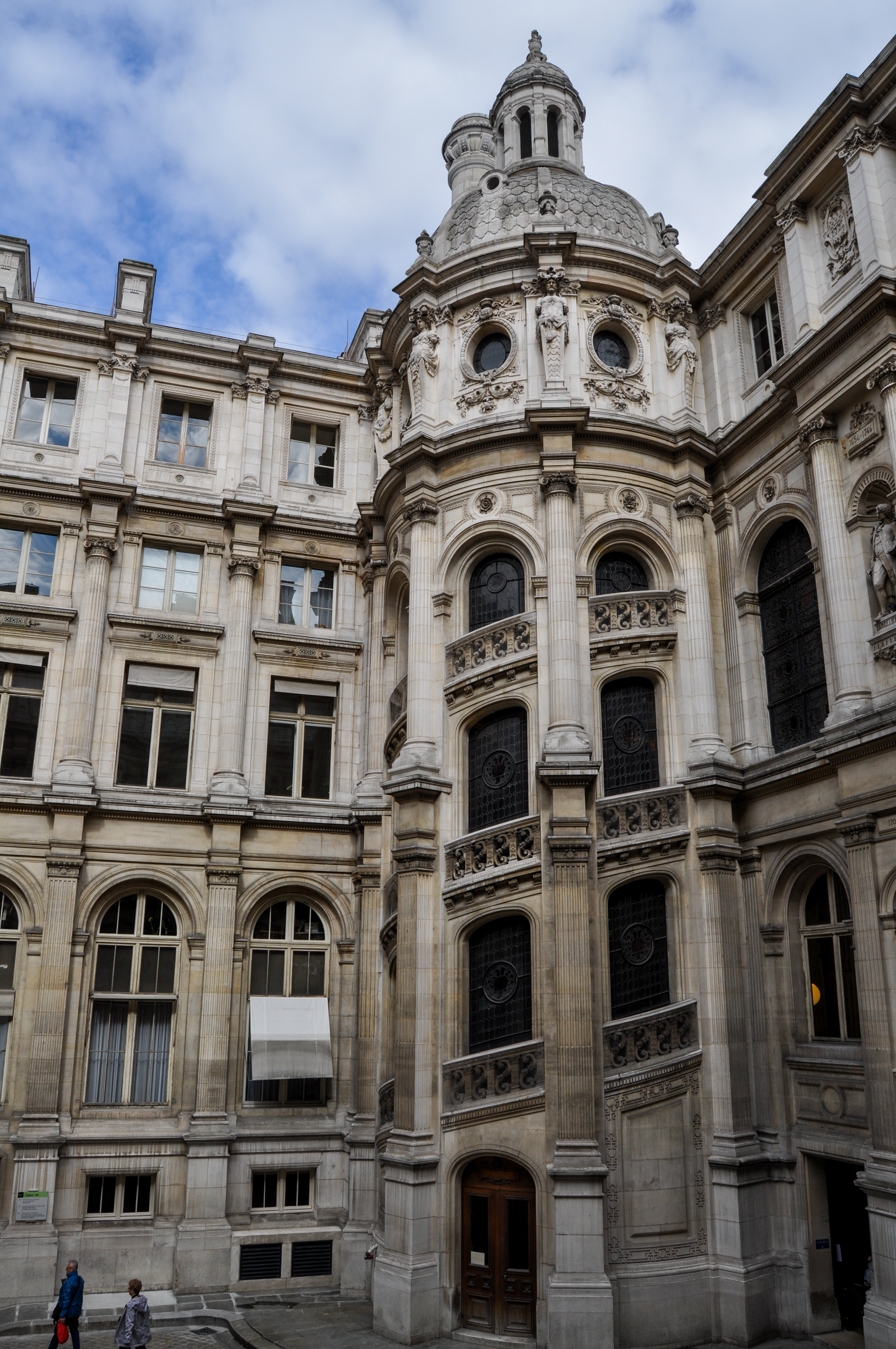
Courtyard with spiraled staircase

=== Statuary of the façades ===
The central ceremonial doors under the clock are flanked by allegorical figures of Art, by Laurent Marqueste, and Science, by Jules Blanchard. Some 230 other sculptors were commissioned to produce 338 individual figures of famous Parisians on each façade, along with lions and other sculptural features. The sculptors included prominent academicians like Ernest-Eugène Hiolle and Henri Chapu, but the most famous was Auguste Rodin. Rodin produced the figure of the 18th-century mathematician Jean le Rond d'Alembert, finished in 1882.

The statue on the garden wall on the south side is of Étienne Marcel, the most famous holder of the post of prévôt des marchands ('provost of the merchants') which predated the office of mayor. Marcel was lynched in 1358 by an angry mob after trying to assert the city's powers too energetically.

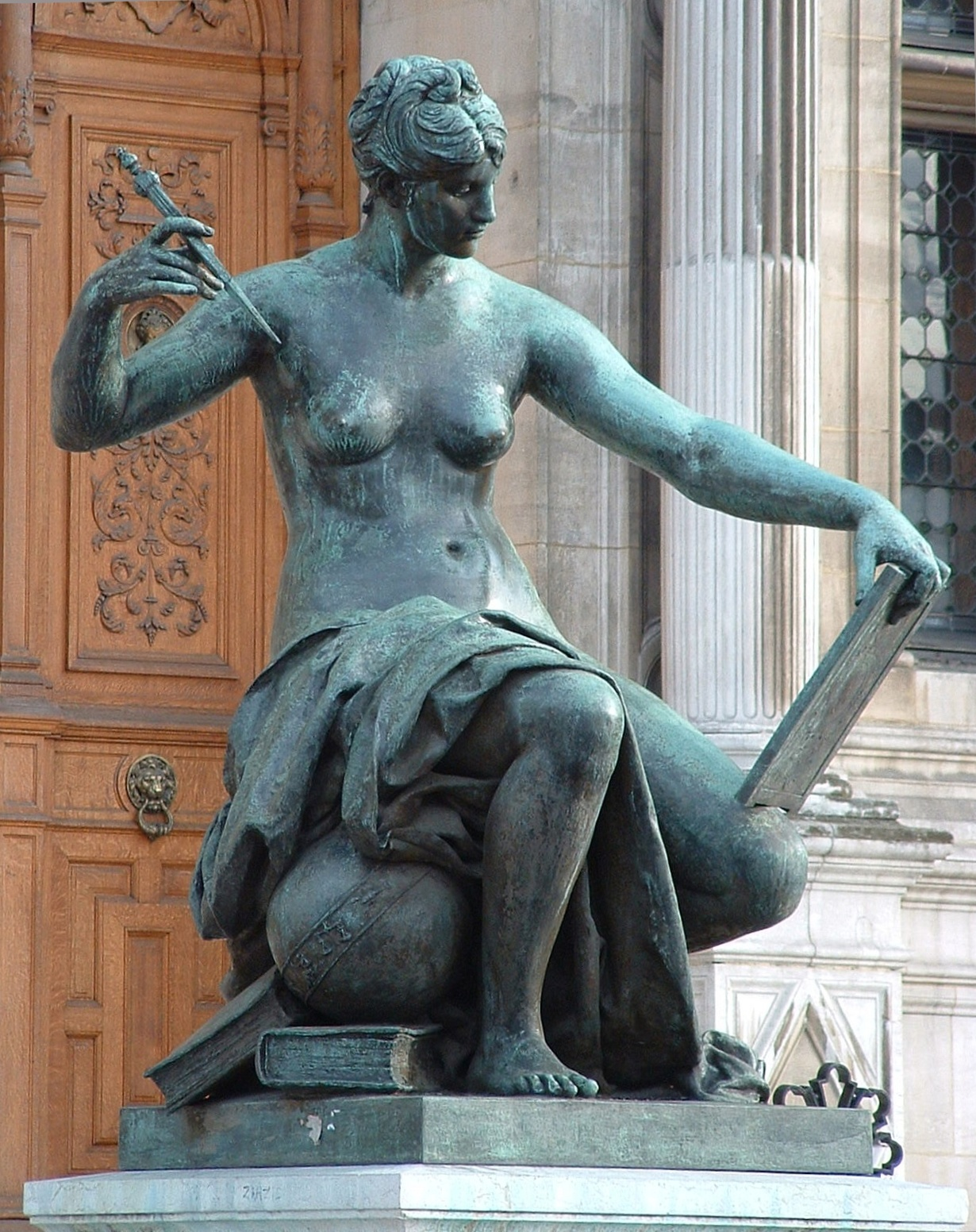
Science, by Jules Blanchard

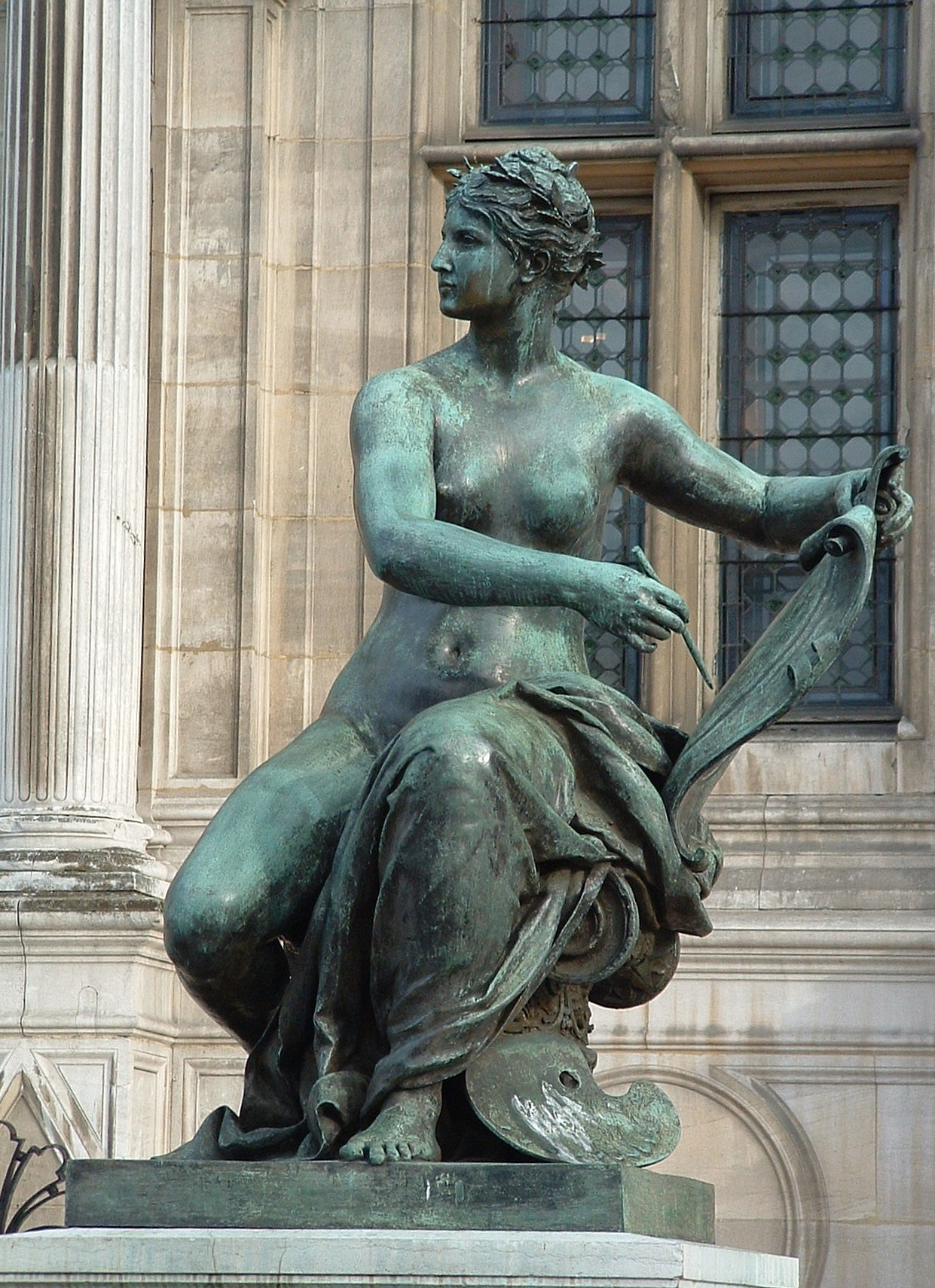
Art, by Laurent Marqueste

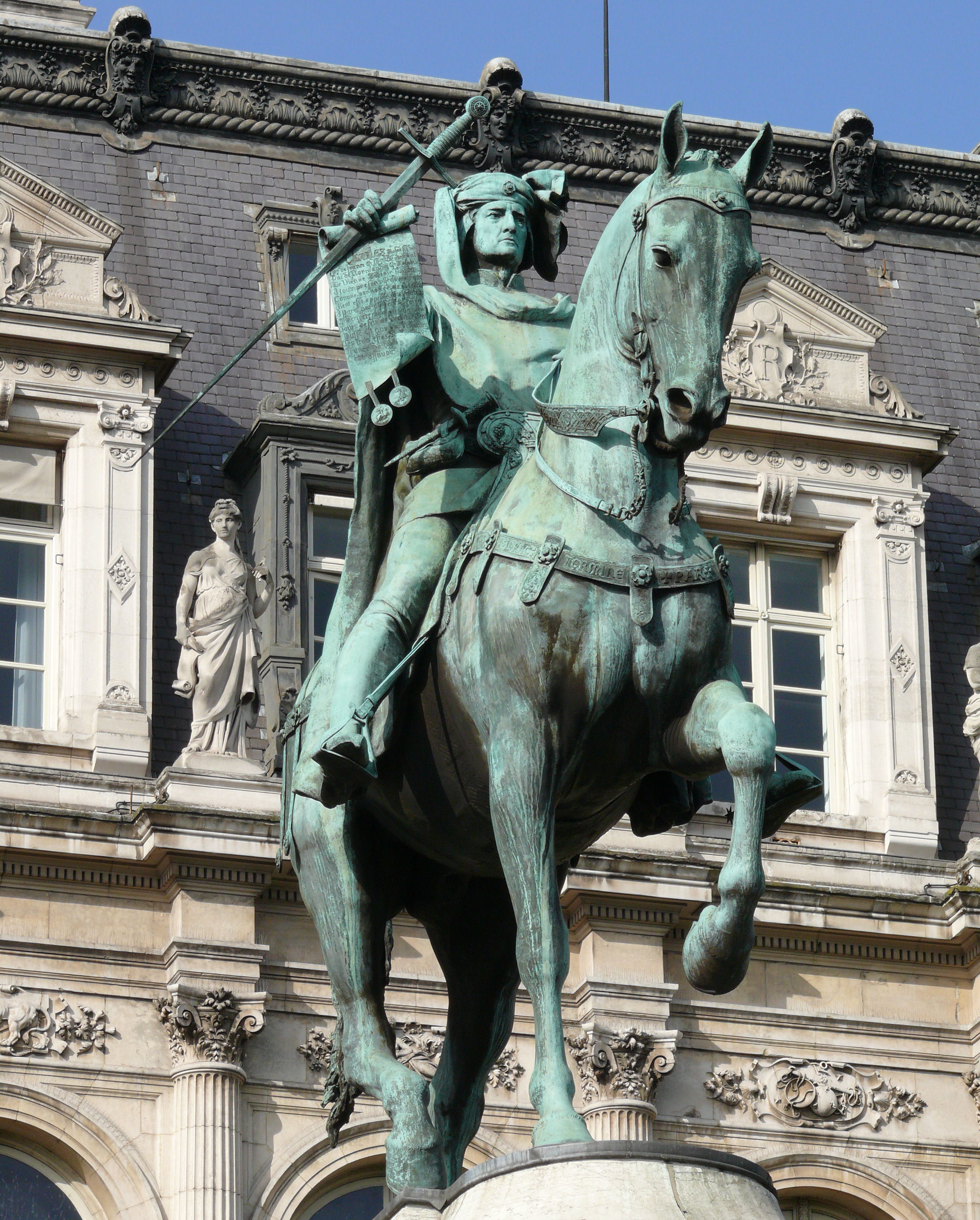
Statue of Etienne Marcel, facing the Seine

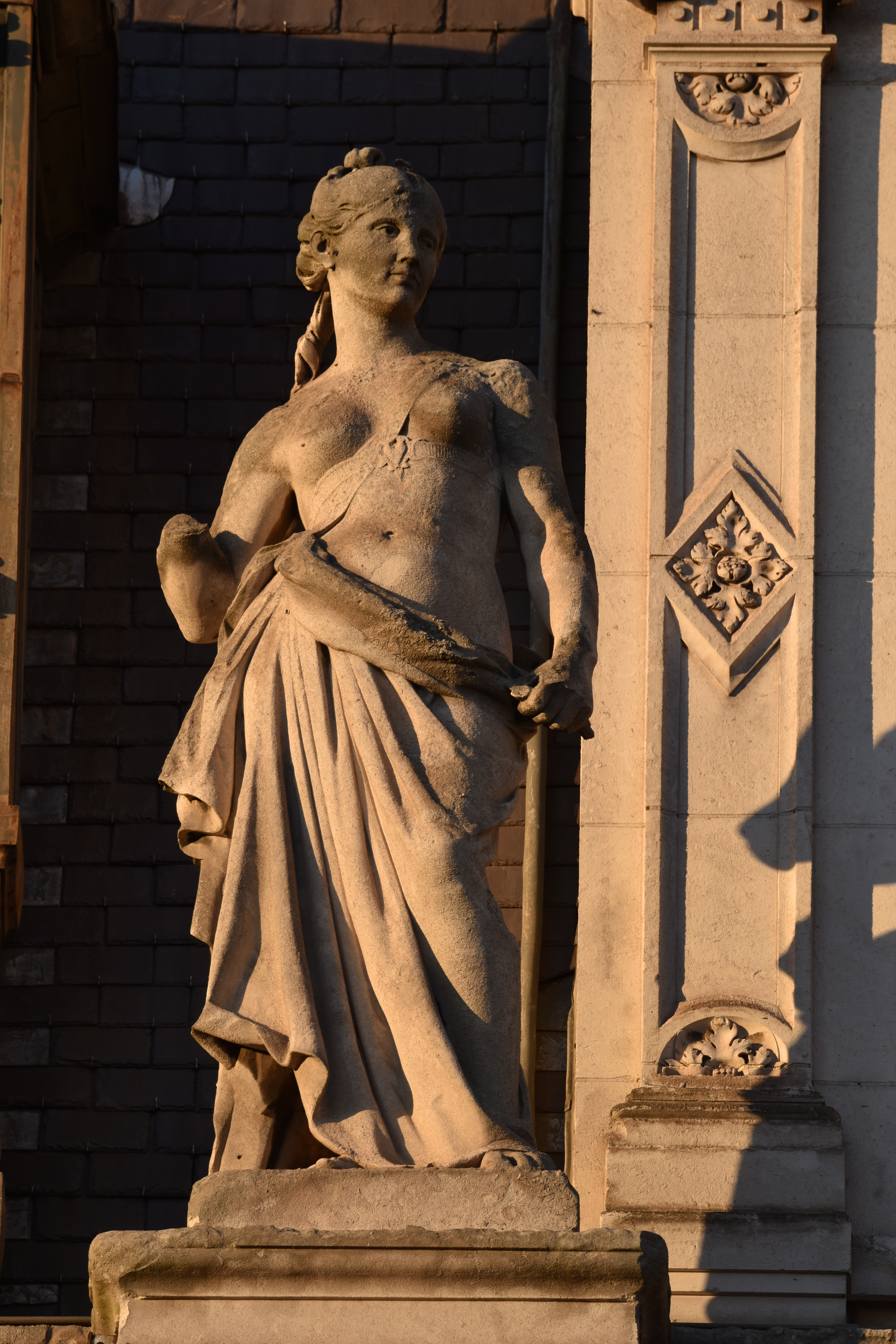
South façade architecture by Henri-Charles Maniglier

=== Interior statuary and paintings ===
==== Salon d'entrée Nord ====
The Salon d'entrée Nord included murals by Henri-Camille Danger. There is also a painting entitled Les Saisons by Puvis de Chavannes.

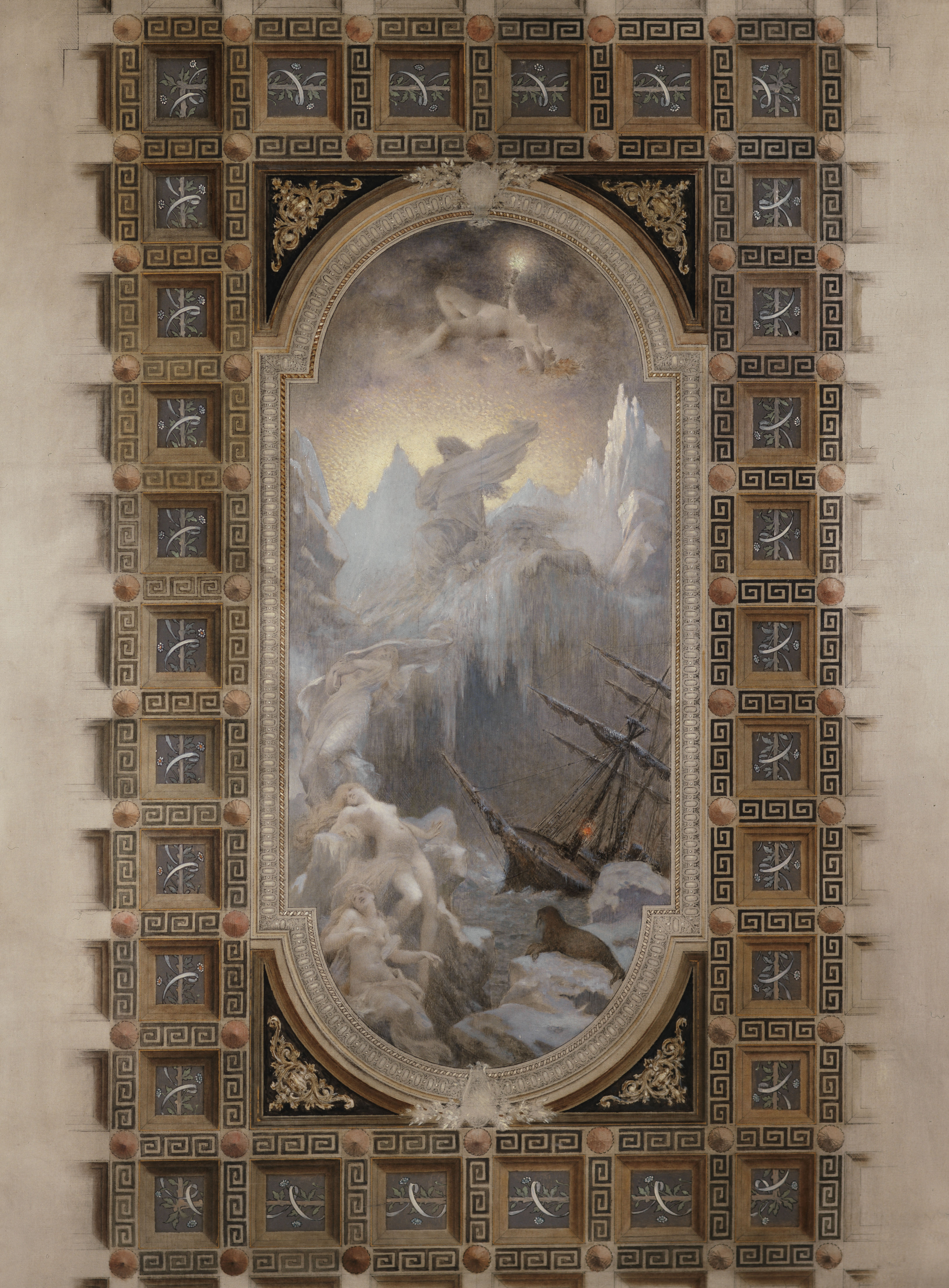
Henri-Camille Danger, North entrance lounge: L'Aurore boréale, 1892 (ceiling)

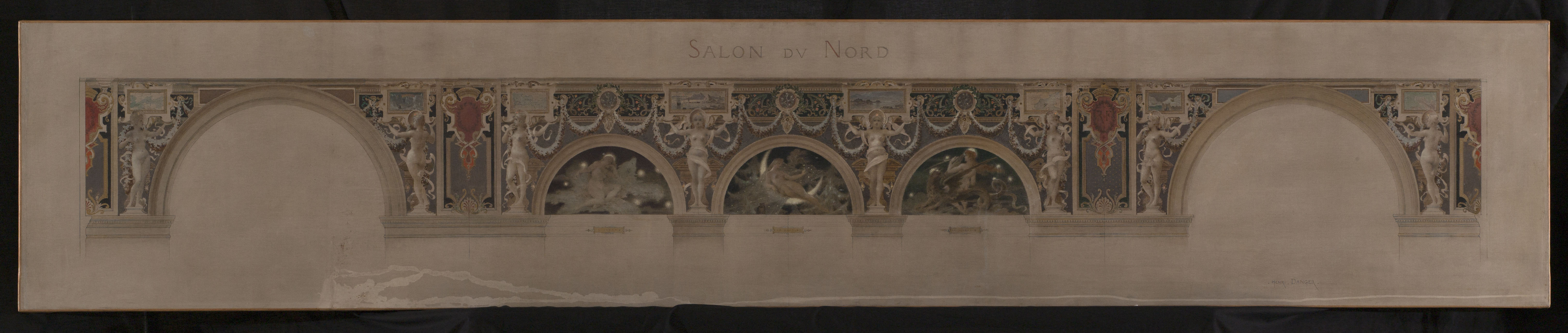
Henri-Camille Danger, sketch for the North entrance lounge. The night. The Dragon.

==== Salle des fêtes ====
The salle des fêtes (ballroom) was designed as a "republican" replica of the Hall of Mirrors at the Palace of Versailles, built two centuries earlier. The frescoes on the arches represent sixteen historical provinces of France. They are the work of four painters: Jean-Joseph Weerts, François-Émile Ehrmann, Paul Milliet and Ferdinand Humbert.

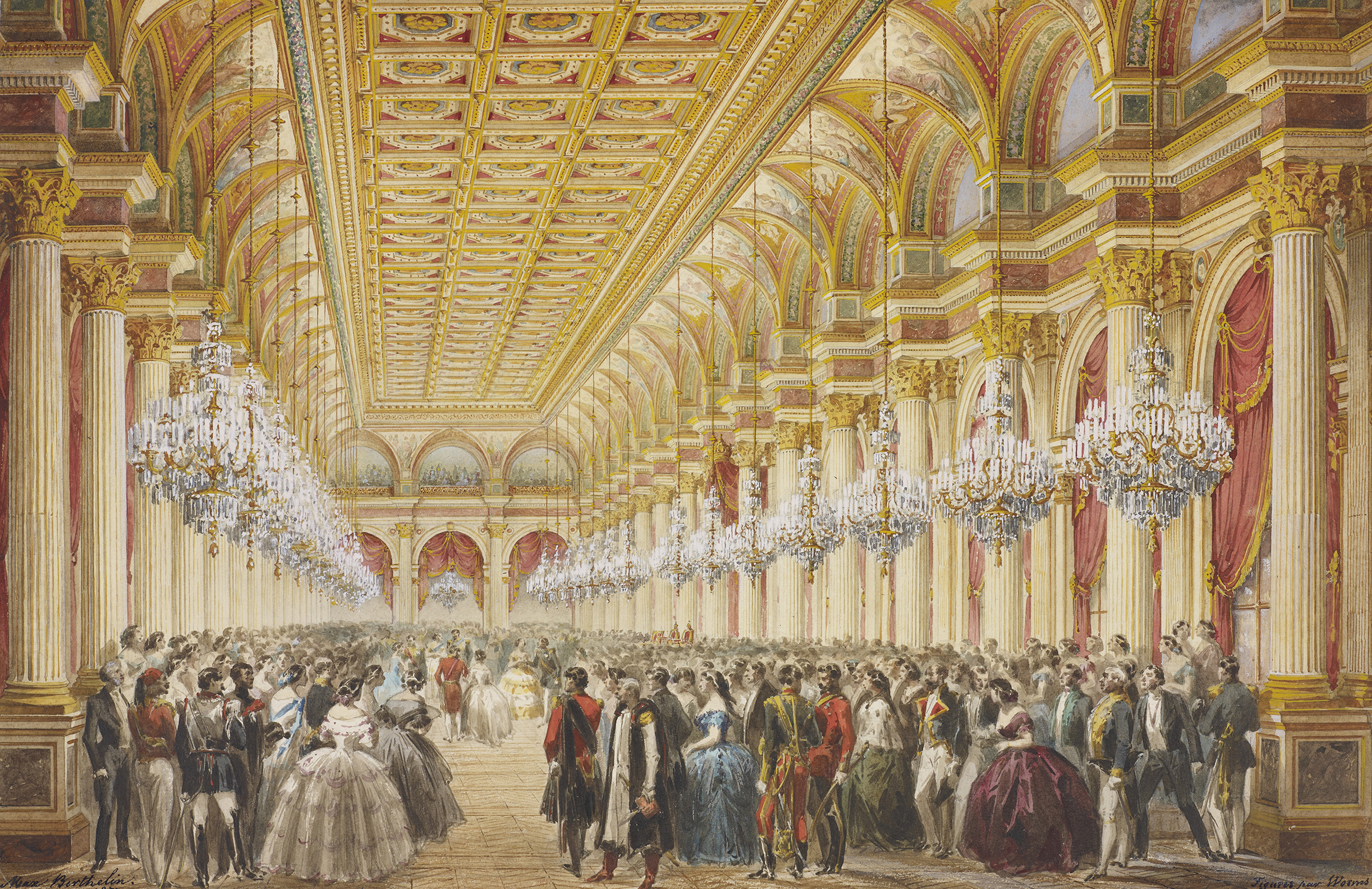
Max Berthelin, The salle des fêtes of the Hôtel de Ville of Paris for the visit of Queen Victoria on 23 August 1855

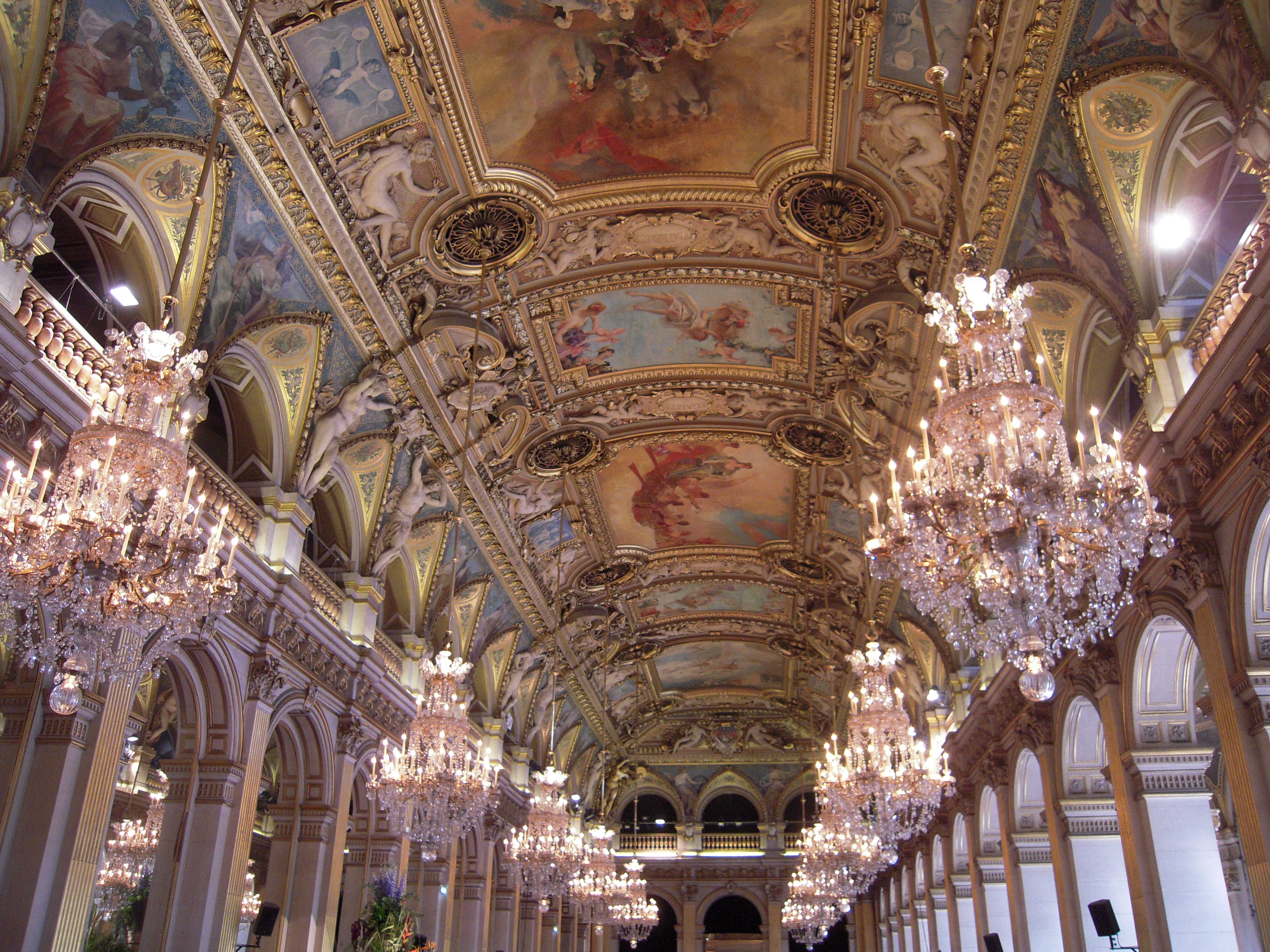
Ceiling of the salle des fêtes

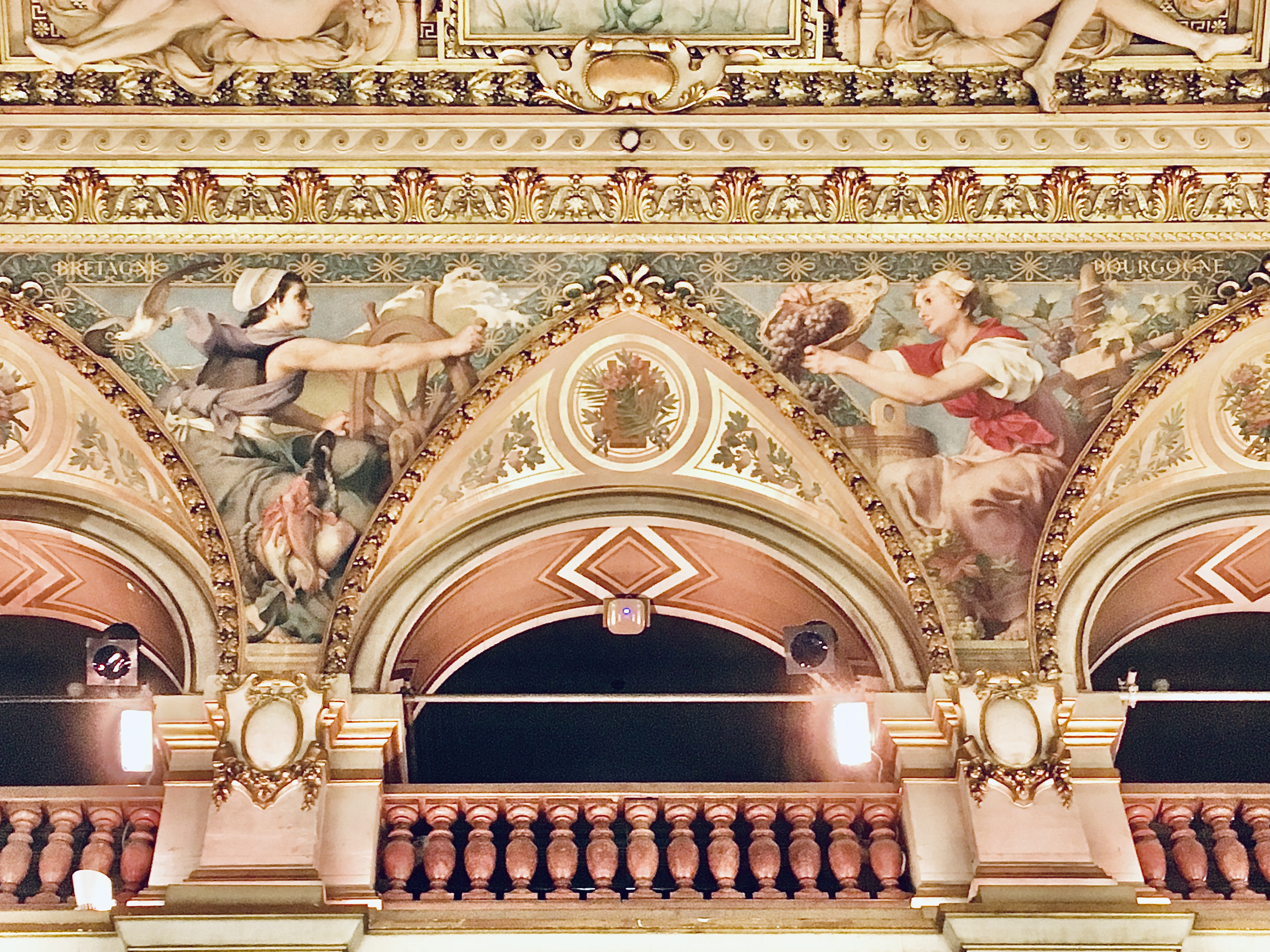
François-Émile Ehrmann, Brittany and Burgundy

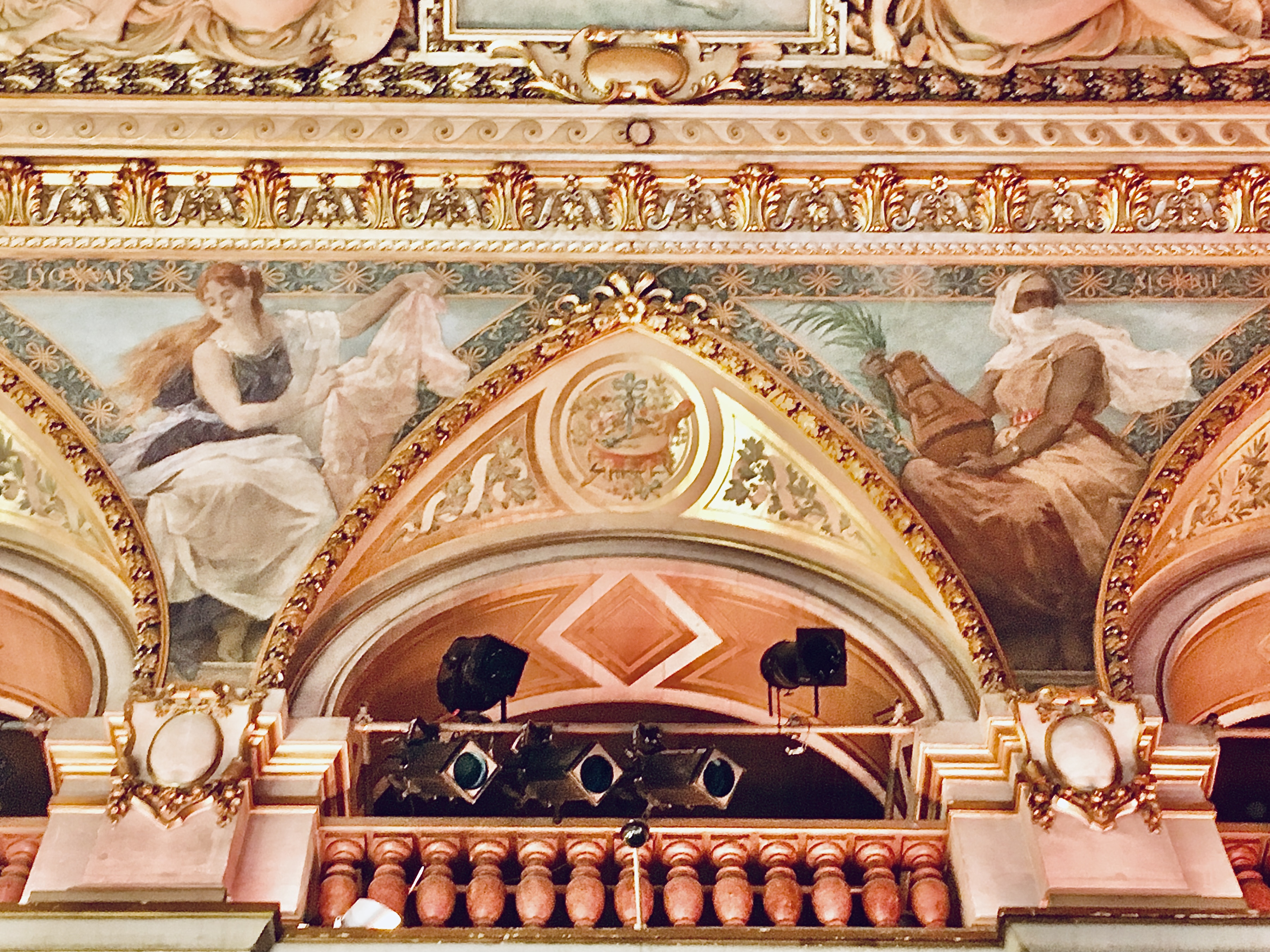
Ferdinand Humbert, Lyonnais and Algeria

==== Salle à manger d'honneur ====
The salle à manger d'honneur (formal dining room) features extensive use of carved oak. It also includes a series of statues.

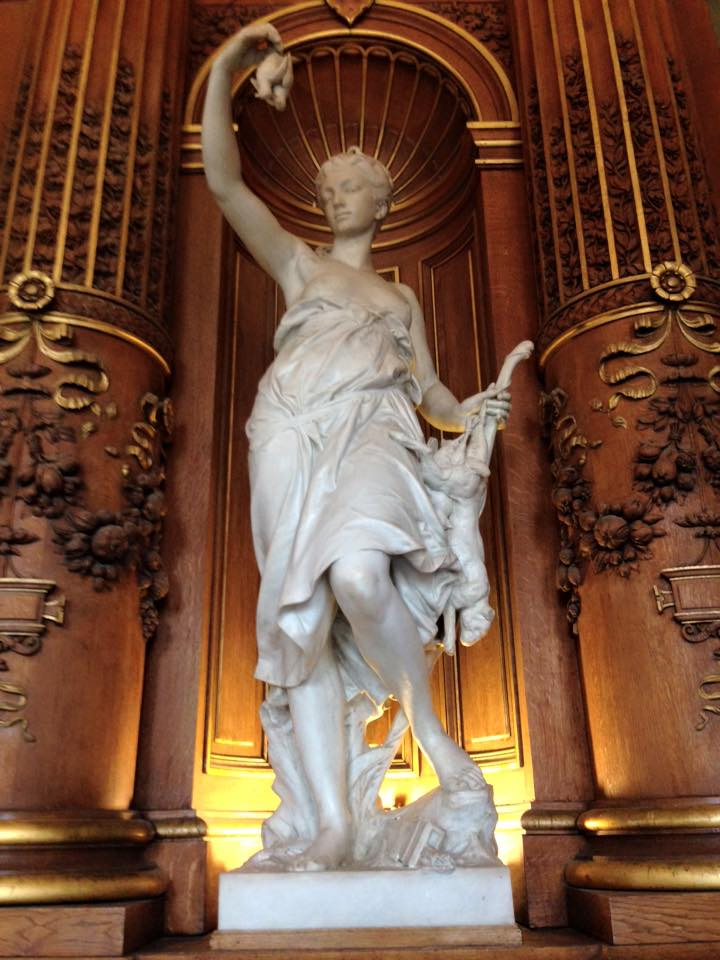
Louis-Ernest Barrias, Hunting (1889), grande salle à manger

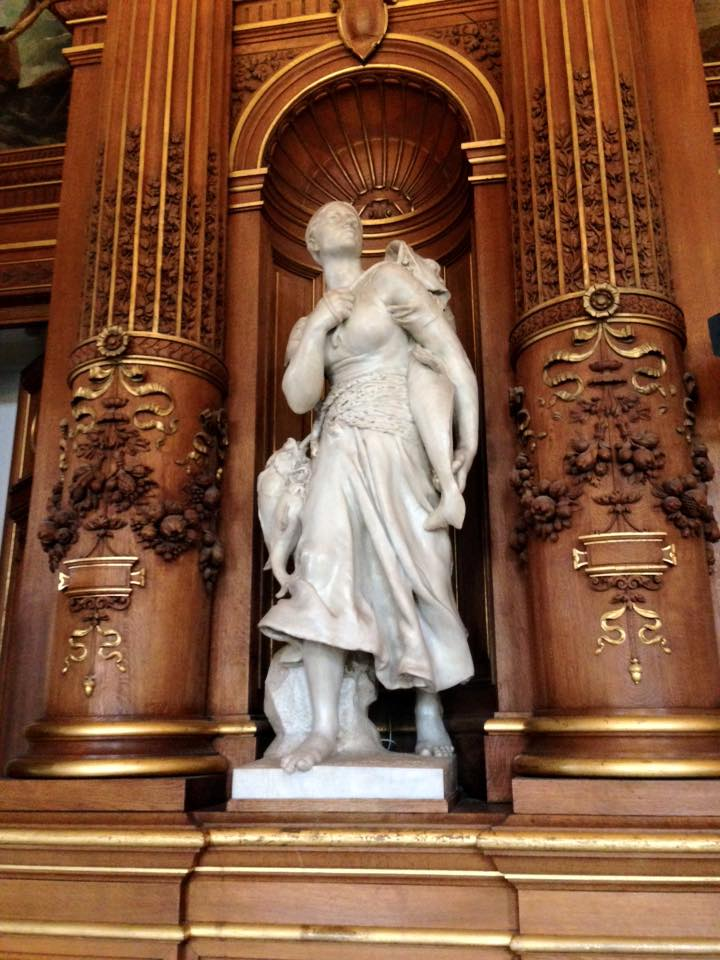
Alexandre Falguière, Fishing (c. 1880), grande salle à manger

==== Salon des Arcades ====
The Salon des Arcades is in three separate parts: the Salon des Arts, the Salon des Sciences and the Salon des Lettres.

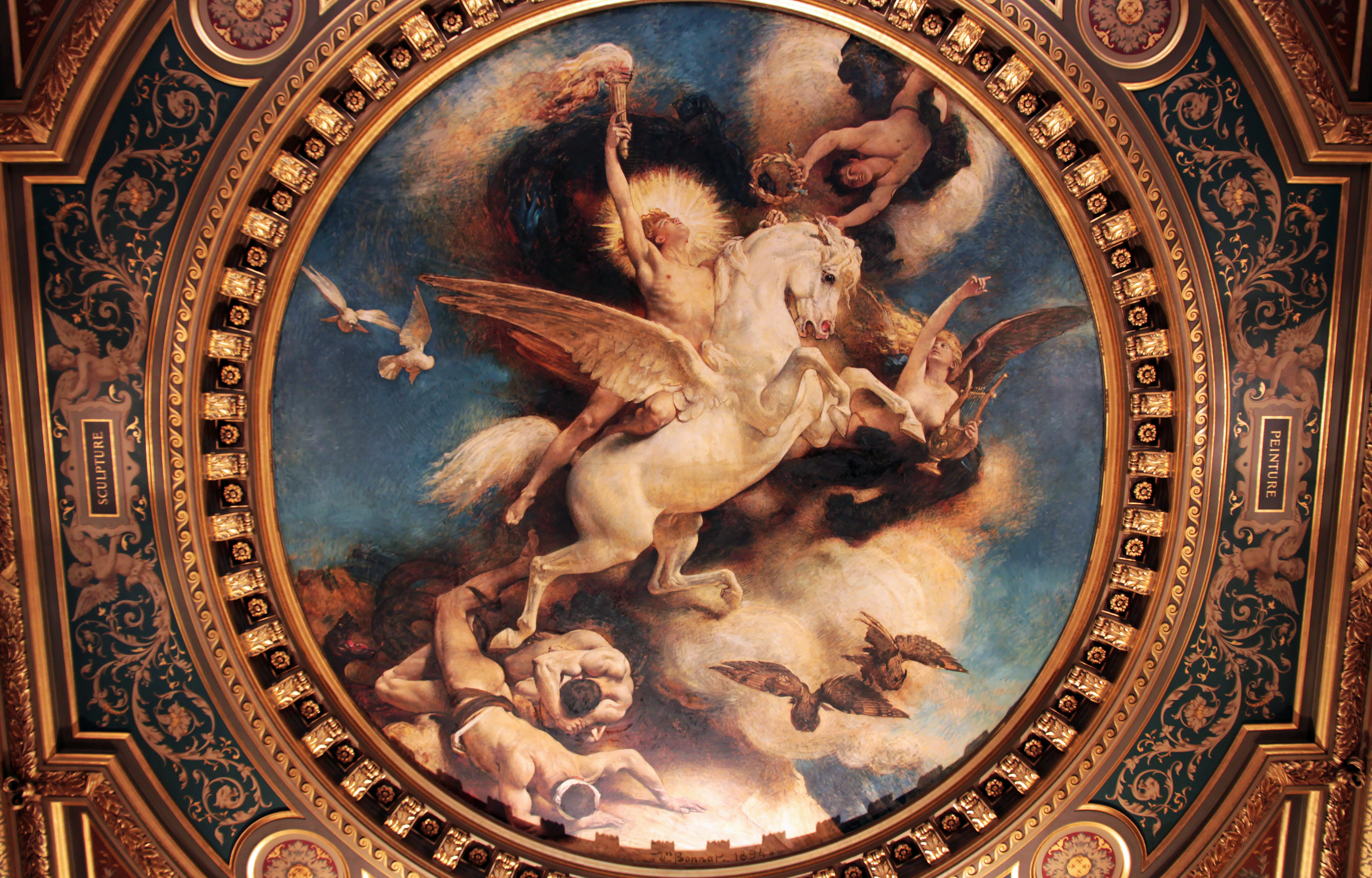
Léon Bonnat, Le Triomphe de l'Art (1894), salon des Arts

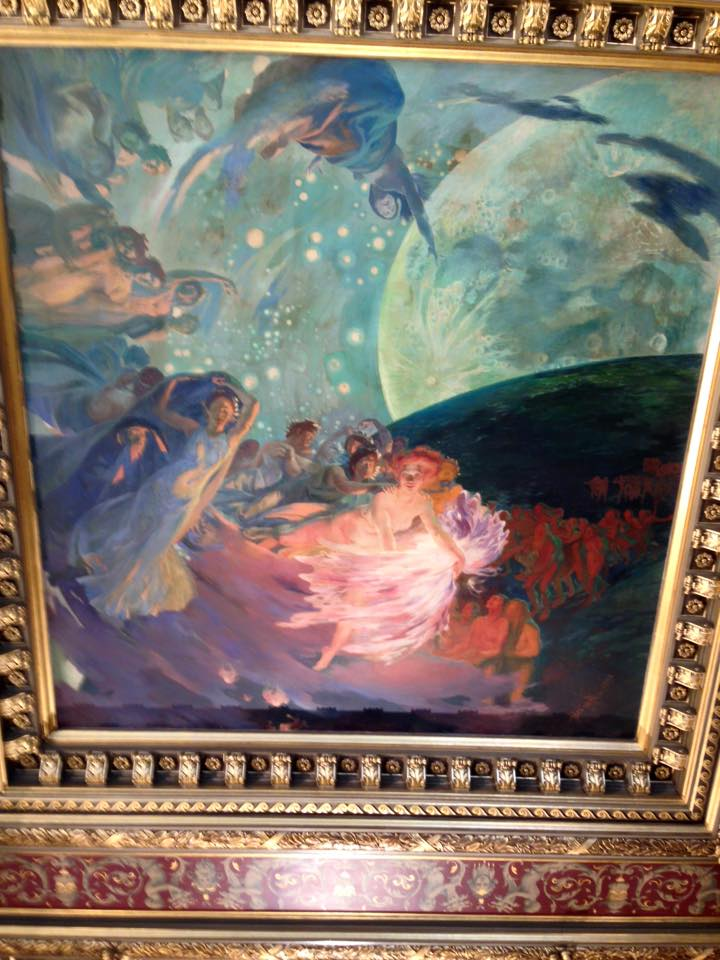
Albert Besnard, La Vérité, entraînant les Sciences à sa suite, c. 1890, salon des Sciences

== Nearby places ==
The northern (left) side of the building is located on the Rue de Rivoli. The nearby Bazar de l'Hôtel de Ville (BHV) is a department store named after the Hôtel de Ville. The closest church to the Hôtel de Ville is the St-Gervais-et-St-Protais Church.

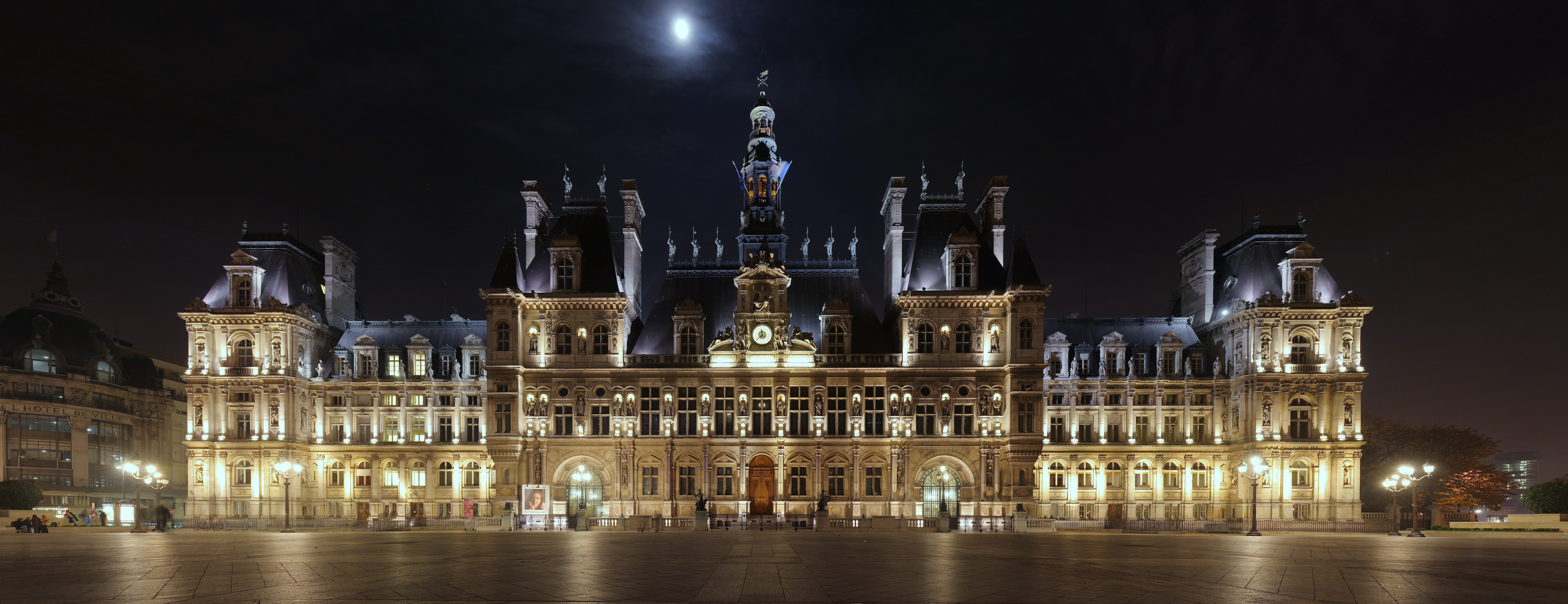
Hôtel de ville at night

== See also ==
- List of town halls in Paris
- Lost artworks
- Place de Grève

== Bibliography ==
- Ayers, Andrew (2004). The Architecture of Paris An Architectural Guide. Edition Axel Menges. ISBN 978-3-930698-96-7.
- De Moncan, Patrice (2009). Les jardins du Baron Haussmann (in French). Ravières: Editions du Mécène. ISBN 978-2-907970-91-4.
- Dumoulin, Aline; Ardisson, Alexandra; Maingard, Jérôme; Antonello, Murielle (2010). Églises de Paris (in French). Issy-Les-Moulineaux: Éditions Massin. ISBN 978-2-7072-0683-1.
- Fierro, Alfred (1996). Histoire et dictionnaire de Paris (in French). Robert Laffont. ISBN 2-221-07862-4.
- Fierro, Alfred (1999). Dictionnaire du Paris disparu (in French). Parigramme. ISBN 2-84096-099-0.
- Horne, Alistair (1965). "Chapter 25: 'La Semaine Sanglante'—II". The Fall of Paris: The Siege and the Commune 1870–1. New York: St. Martin's Press.
- Horne, Alistair (2015). The Fall of Paris: The Siege and the Commune 1870–71. Picador. OCLC 922079975.
- Lambeau, Lucien (1908). L'Hôtel de ville de Paris. Les Richesses d'art de la ville de Paris (in French). Paris: Renouard.
- Mead, Christopher Curtis (1991). Charles Garnier's Paris Opéra Architectural Empathy and the Renaissance of French Classicism. Architectural History Foundation. ISBN 978-0262132756.
- Milza, Pierre (2009a). L'année terrible : La Commune (mars–juin 1871) (in French). Paris: Perrin. ISBN 978-2-262-03073-5.
- Poisson, Michel (2009). 1000 Immeubles et monuments de Paris (in French). Parigramme. ISBN 978-2-84096-539-8.
- Scurr, Ruth (2007). Fatal Purity: Robespierre and the French Revolution. Henry Holt and Company. ISBN 978-1-4668-0578-1.
- Texier, Simon (2012). Paris - Panorama de l'architecture (in French). Parigramme. ISBN 978-2-84096-667-8.
- Unger, Gérard (2022). Gambetta (in French). Paris: Perrin. ISBN 978-2-262-07991-8.
- Vachon, Marius (1905). L'Hôtel de ville de Paris, 1535–1905 (in French). Paris: Plon-Nourrit.
