= Henri-Charles Maniglier =

French sculptor

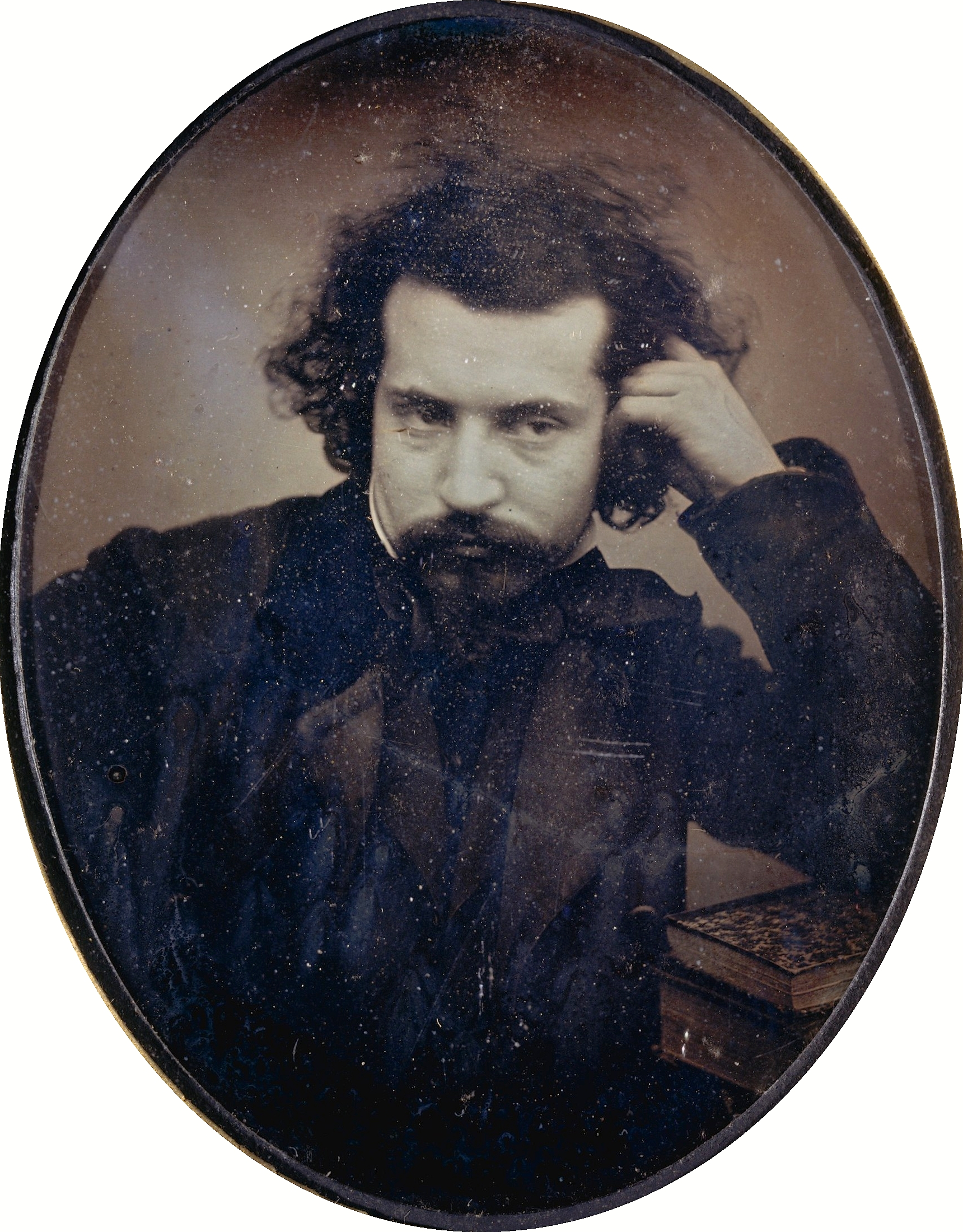
- Henri-Charles Maniglier (c. 1850), anonymous Daguerreotype, New York City, Metropolitan Museum of Art.

Henri-Charles Maniglier (October 11, 1826 Paris – March 17, 1901) was a French sculptor.

== Biography ==
Maniglier was a pupil of Augustin-Alexandre Dumont and Étienne-Jules Ramey at the École des Beaux-Arts, and won the Prix de Rome in 1856. He executed a bas-relief for the Paris Opera House, many busts, and the statue, "Pénélope portant à ses prétendants l'arc d'Ulysse" (1868), in the Luxembourg. In 1858 he was made professor of sculpture at the École des Beaux-Arts. He received the cross of the Legion of Honor in 1878, and a bronze medal at the Exposition of 1889.
