= List of town halls in Paris =

List of town halls in Paris

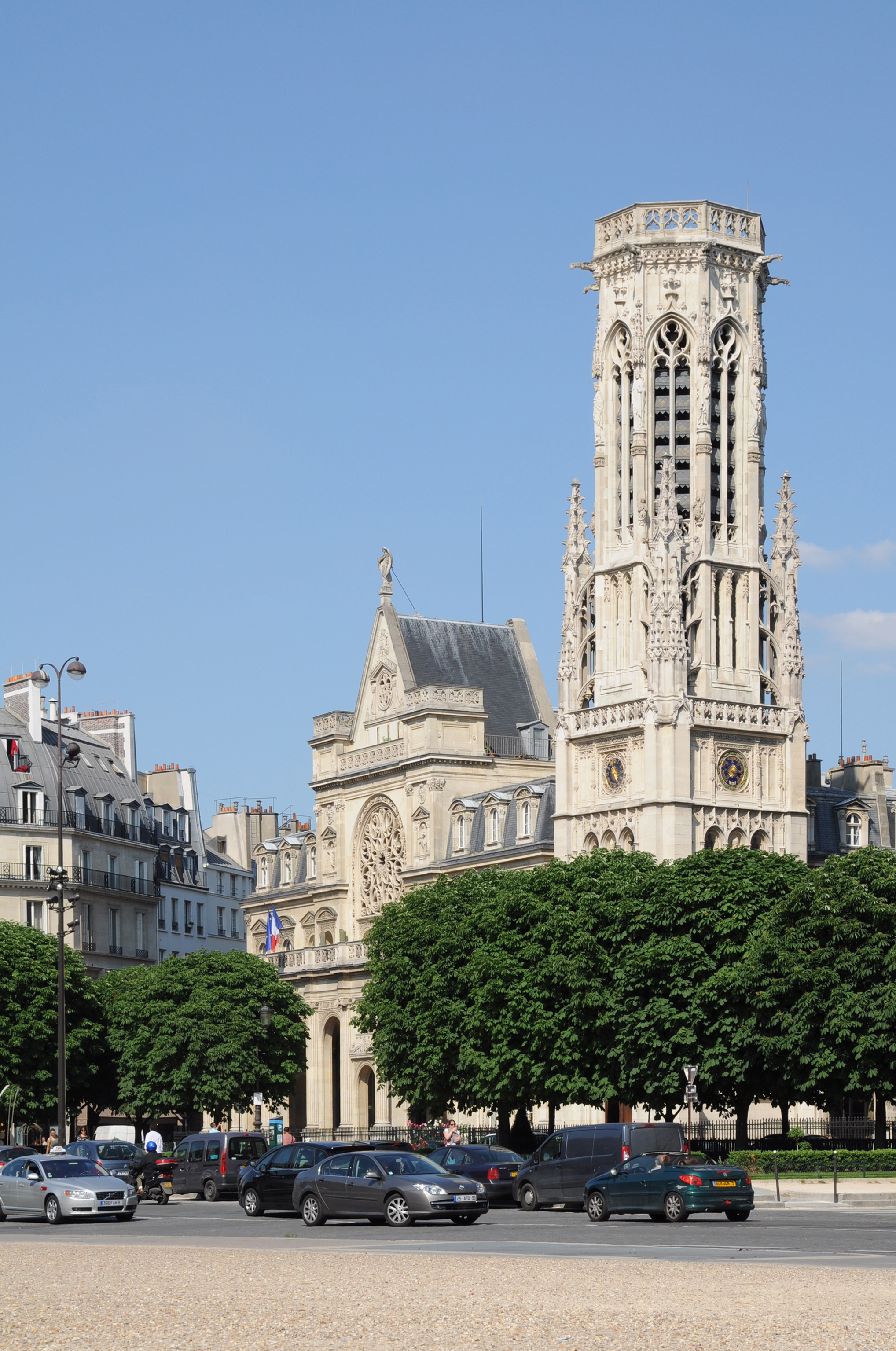
1st arrondissement

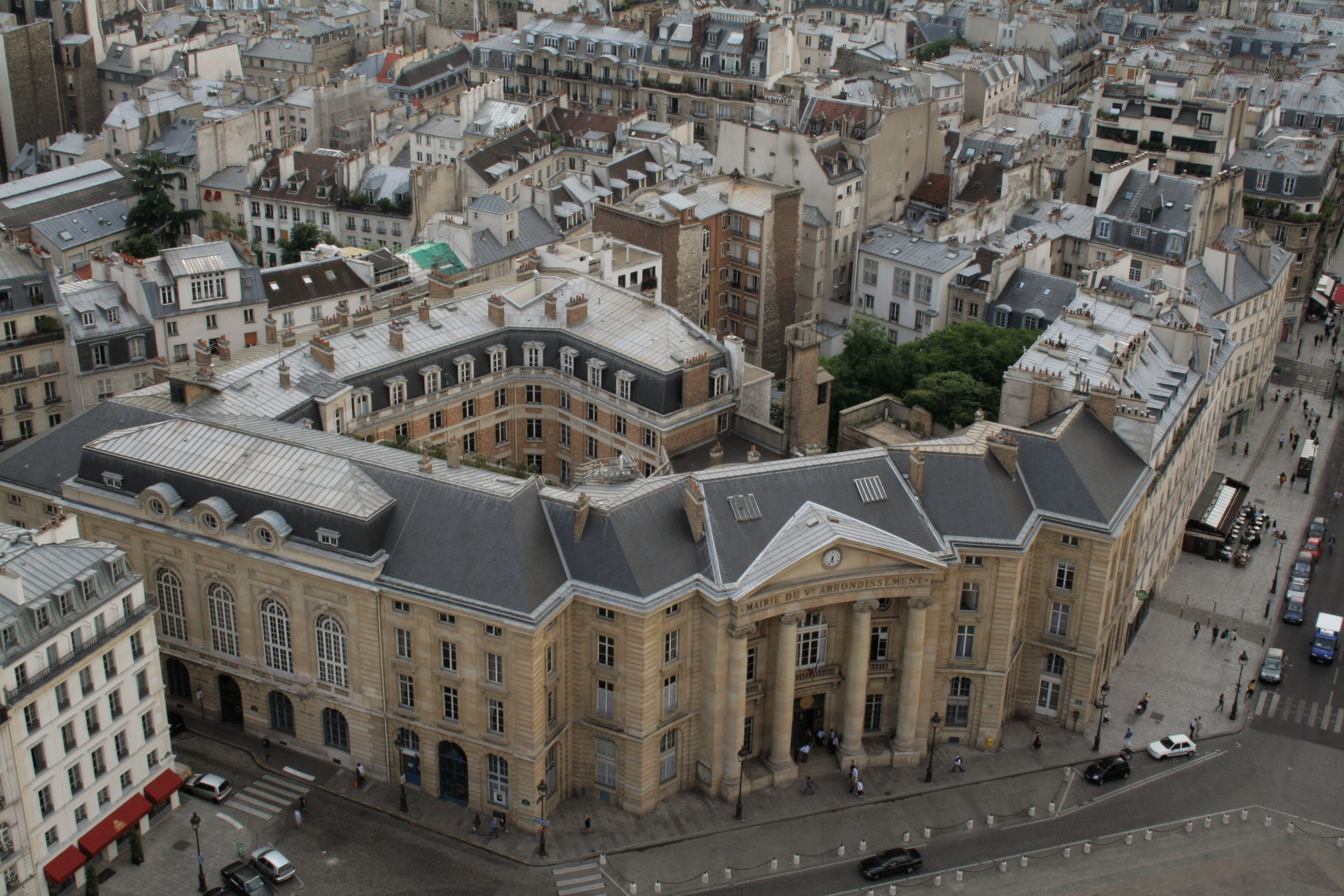
5th arrondissement

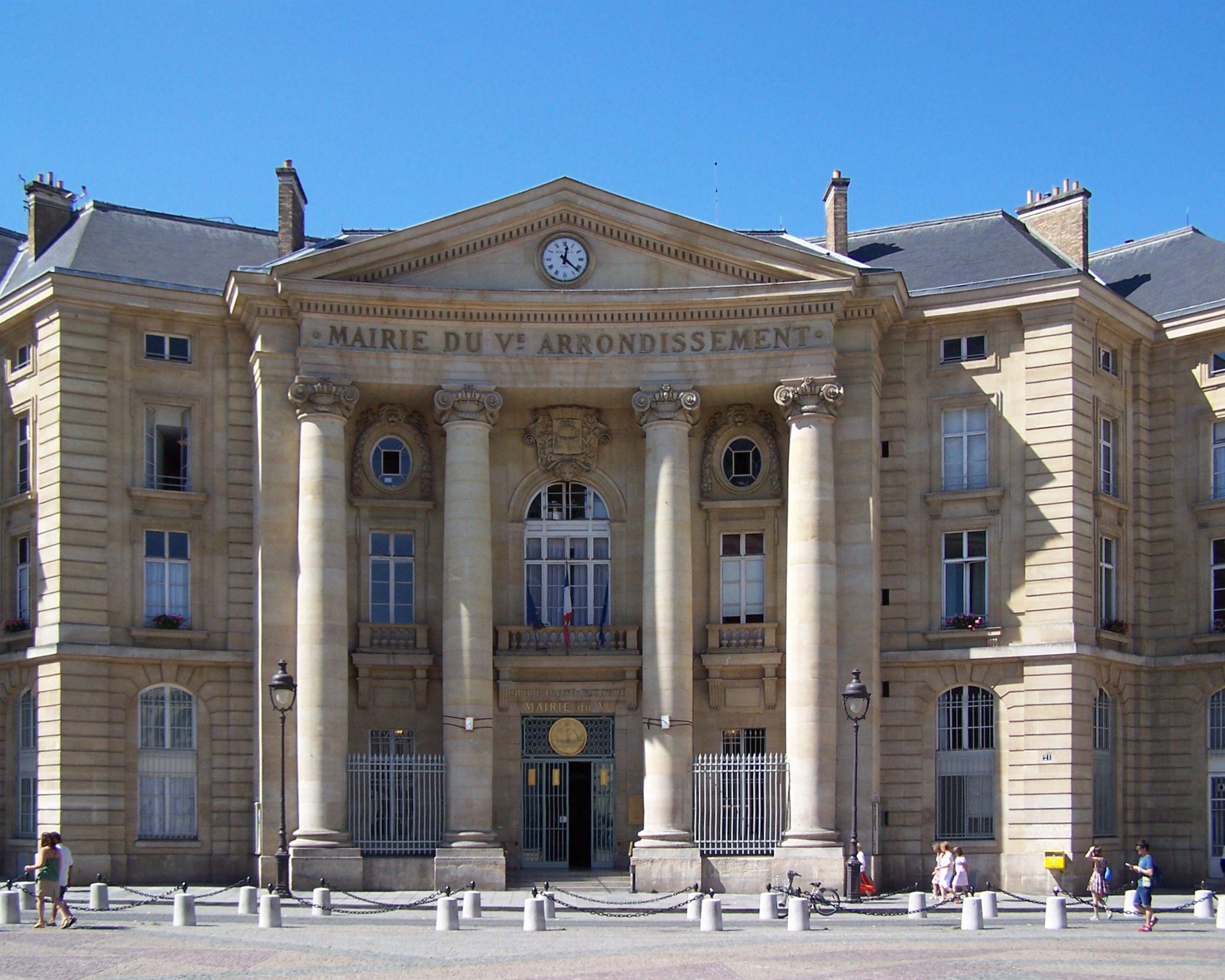
5th arrondissement

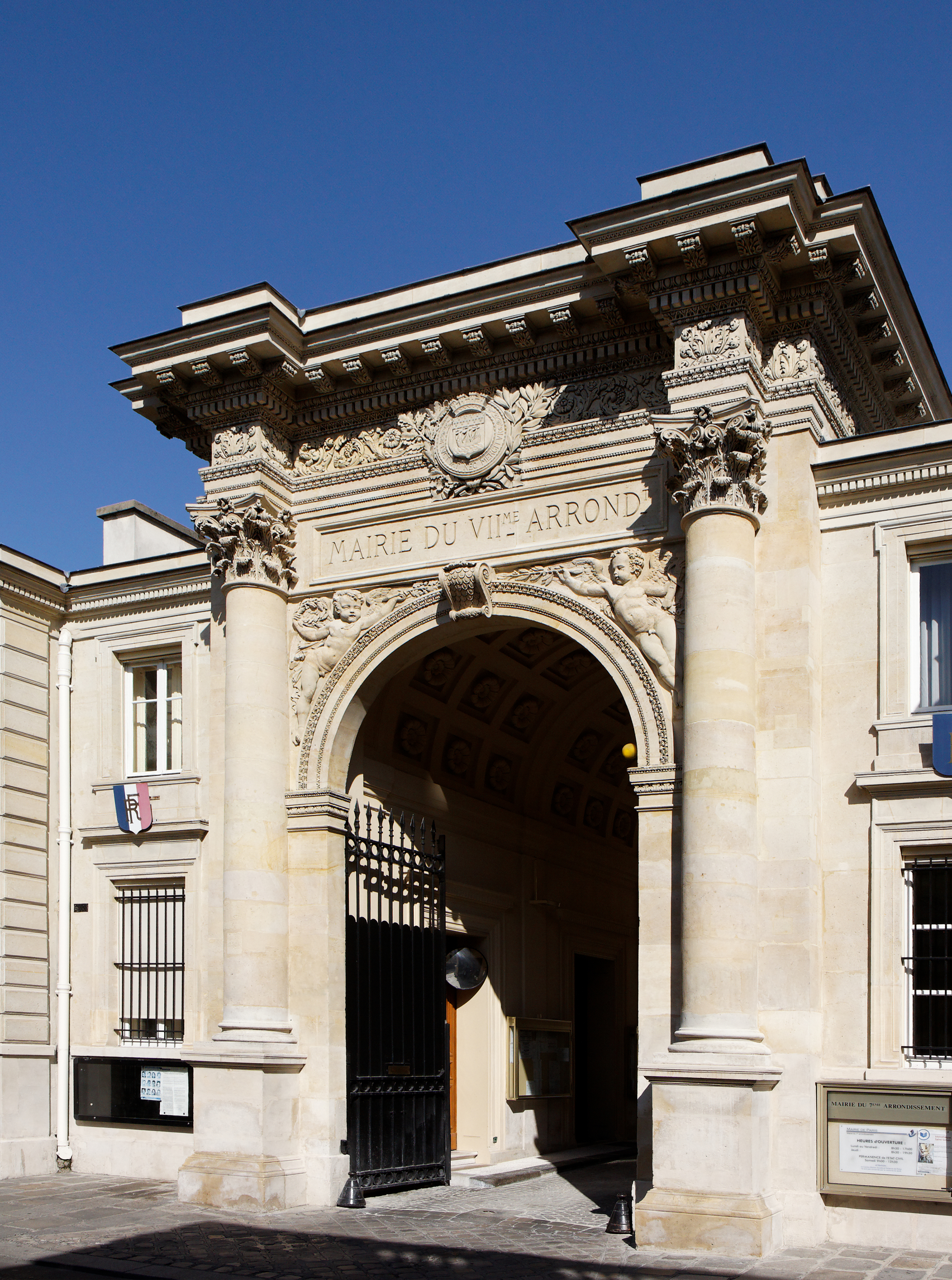
7th arrondissement

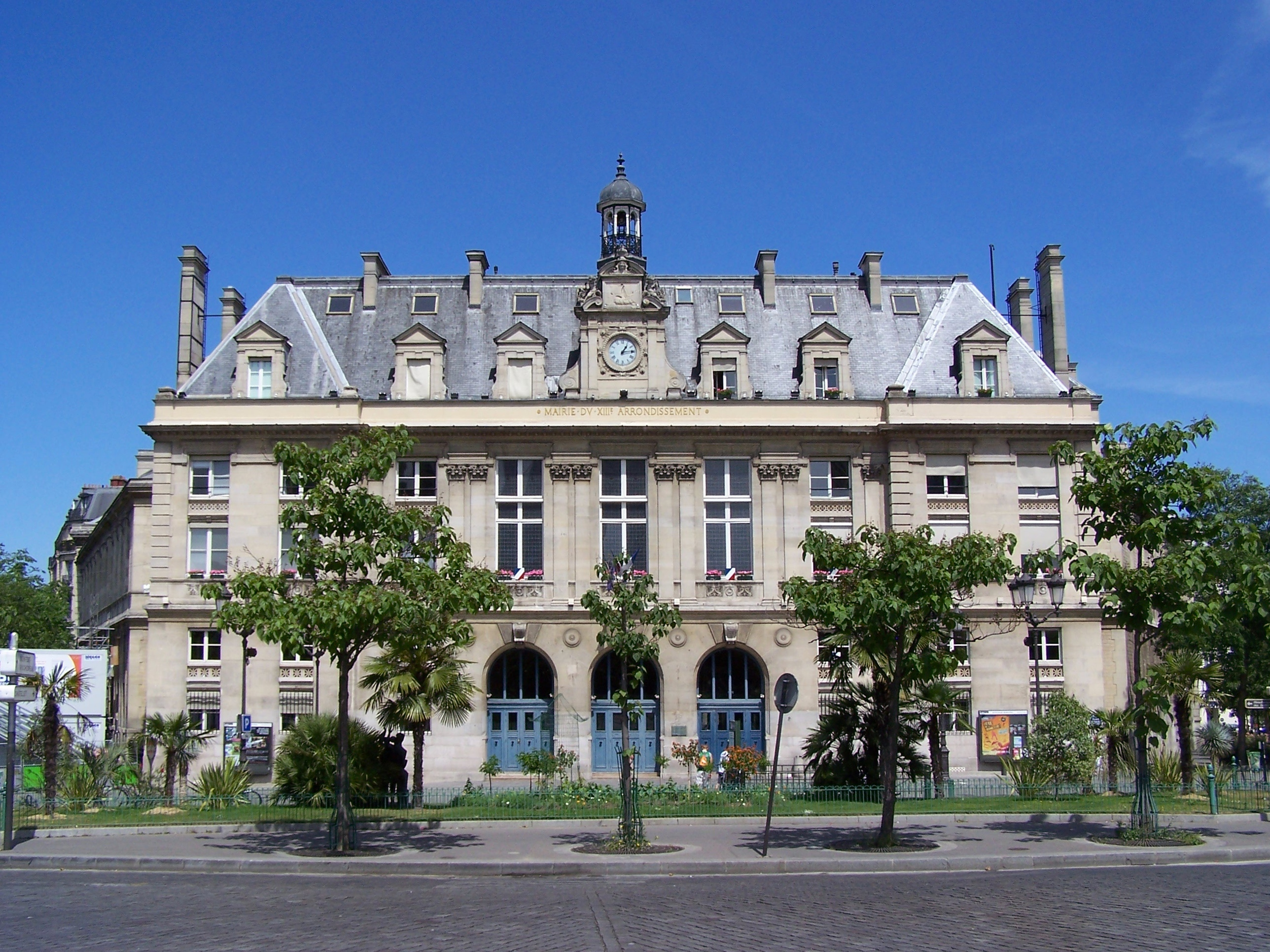
13th arrondissement

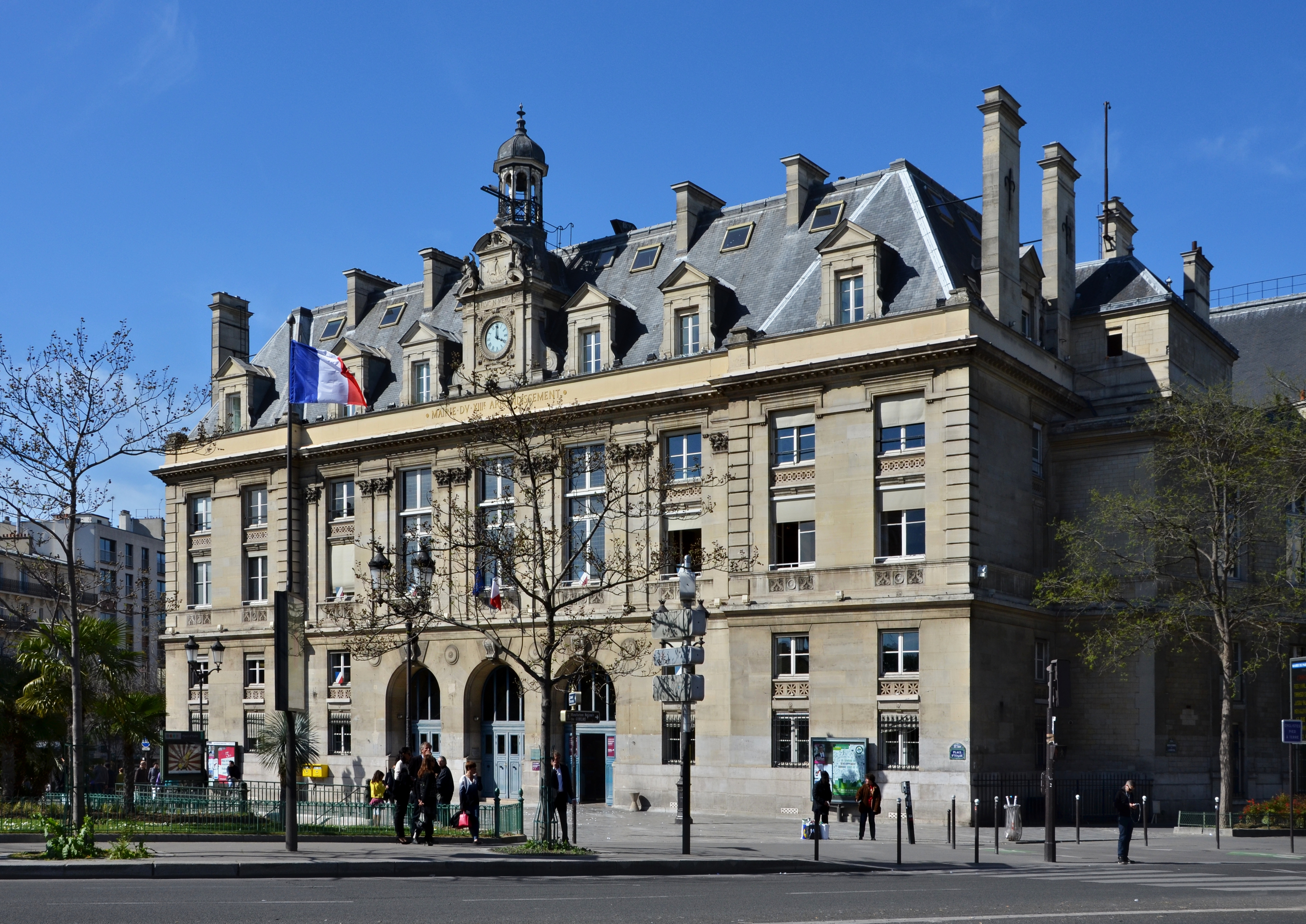
13th arrondissement

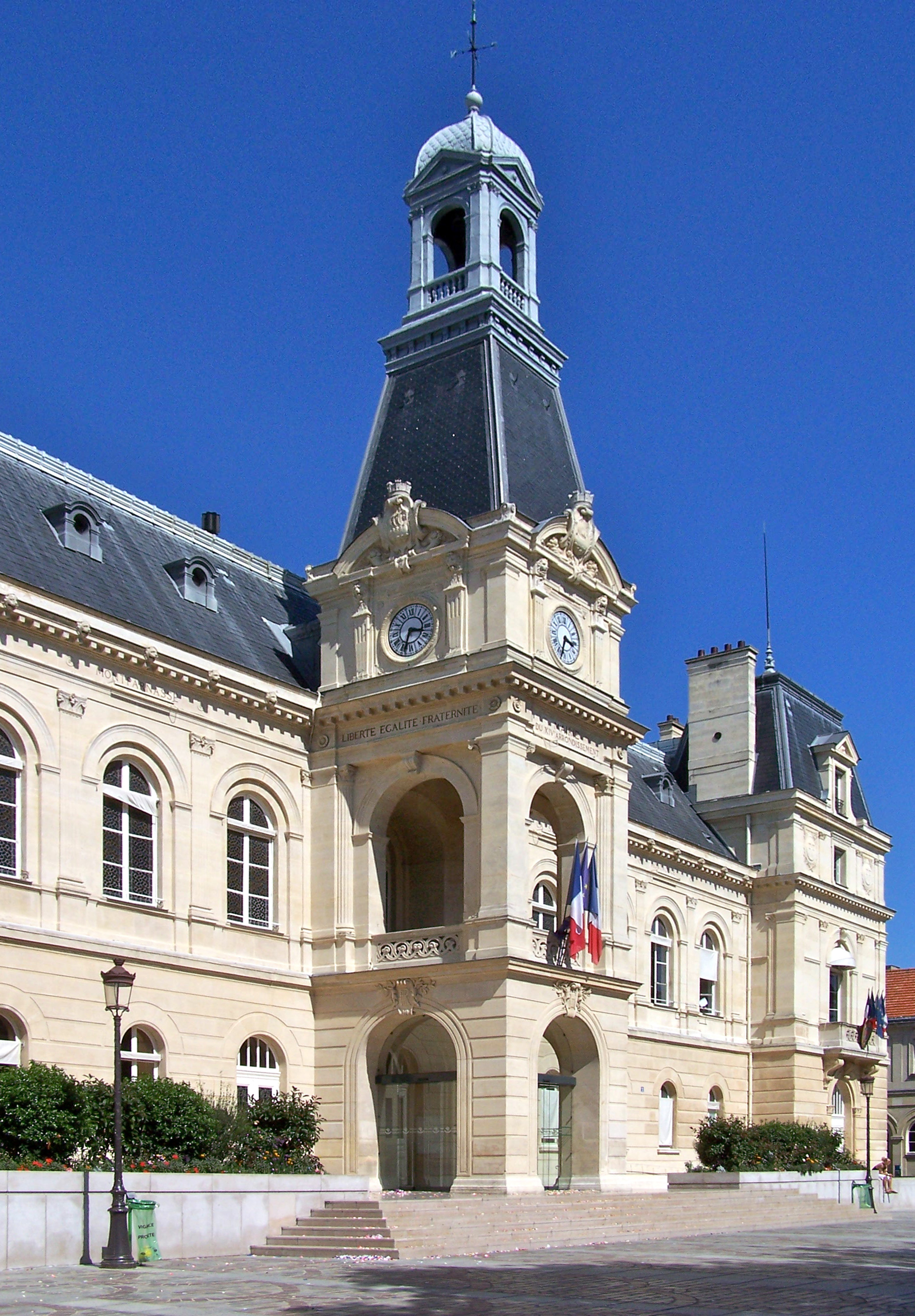
14th arrondissement

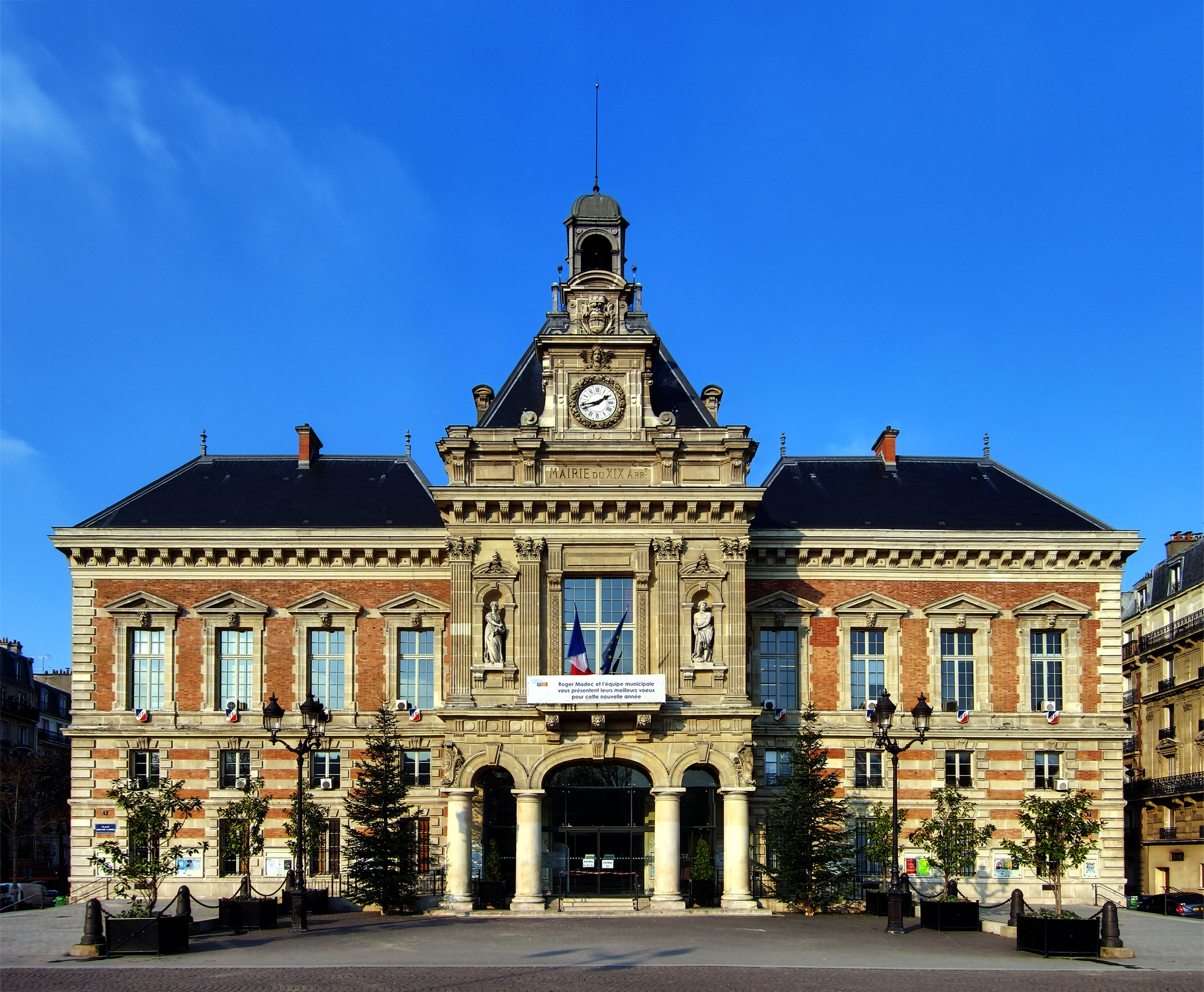
19th arrondissement

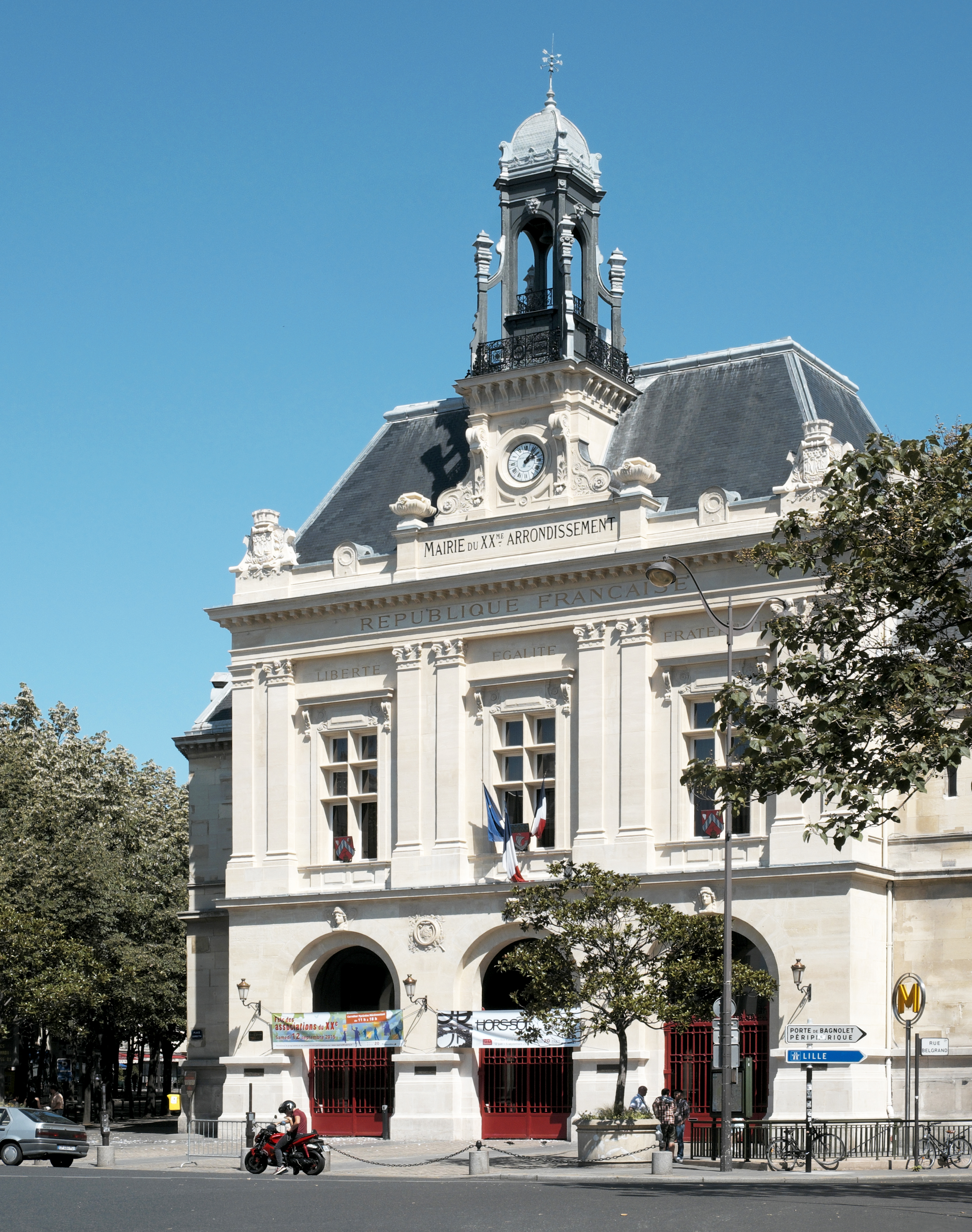
20th arrondissement

10th arrondissement

10th arrondissement

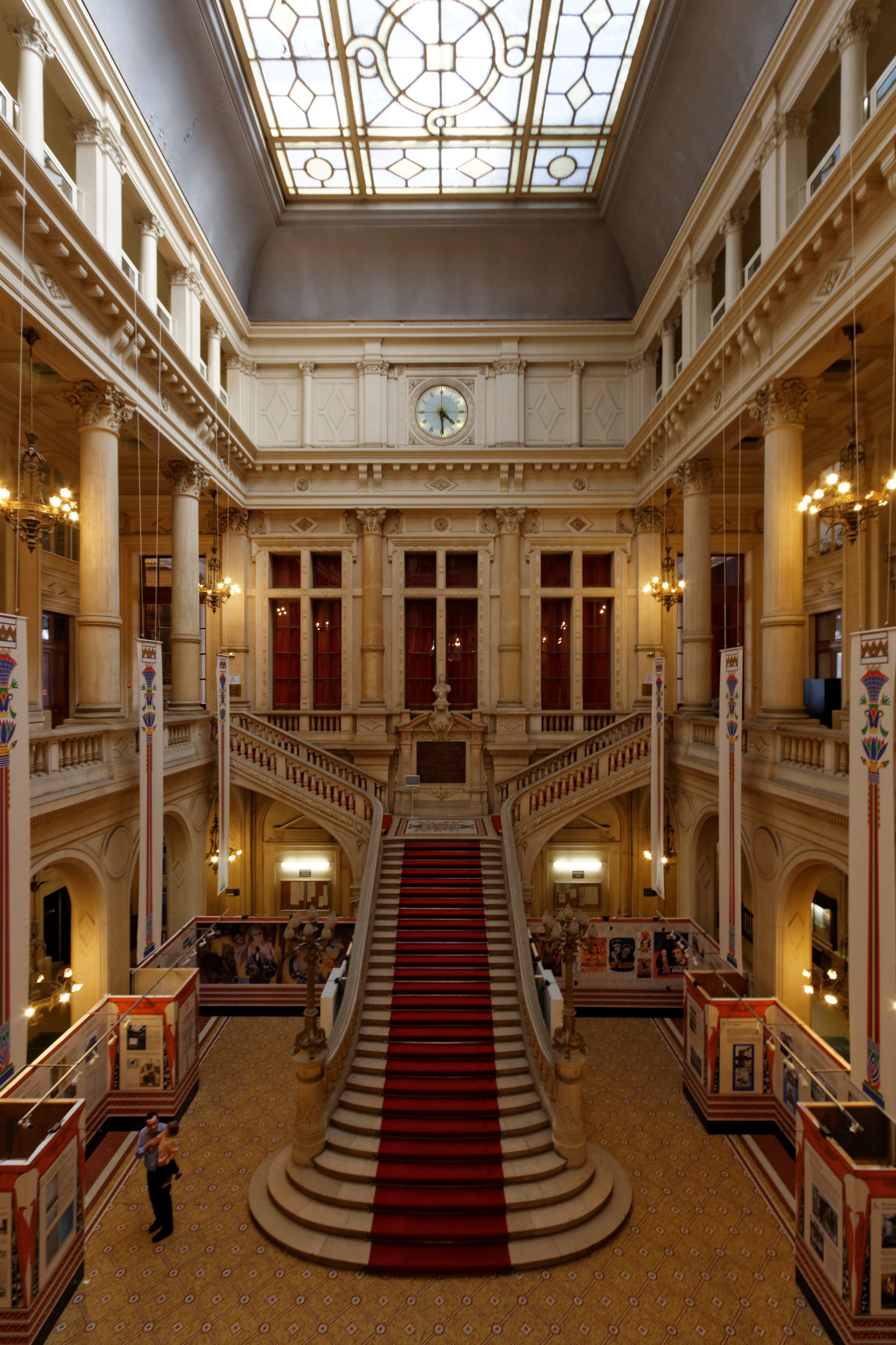
10th arrondissement

== Town halls in Paris ==
Name	Address	Construction	Architect	Coordinates
Paris City Hall	Place de l'Hôtel-de-Ville - Esplanade de la Libération	1874 – 1882	Théodore Ballu, Édouard Deperthes	48°51′23″N 2°21′08″E
Town hall of Paris 1st arrondissement	4 place du Louvre	1858 – 1860	Jacques Hittorff	48°51′36″N 2°20′29″E
Town hall of Paris 2nd arrondissement	8 rue de la Banque	1848	Alphonse Girard	48°52′01″N 2°20′23″E
Town hall of Paris 3rd arrondissement	2 rue Eugène-Spuller	1864 – 1867	Victor Calliat, Eugène-Alexandre Chat	48°51′50″N 2°21′42″E
Town hall of Paris 4th arrondissement	2 place Baudoyer	1868 – 1868	Antoine-Nicolas Bailly	48°51′22″N 2°21′22″E
Town hall of Paris 5th arrondissement	21 place du Panthéon	1846 – 1849	Jacques Hittorff	48°50′45″N 2°20′40″E
Town hall of Paris 6th arrondissement	78 rue Bonaparte	1847 – 1849	Rolland, Levicomte	48°51′02″N 2°19′56″E
Town hall of Paris 7th arrondissement	116 rue de Grenelle	1862 – 1862	Joseph Uchard	48°51′25″N 2°19′13″E
Town hall of Paris 8th arrondissement	3 rue de Lisbonne	1865 – 1865	Albert Labouret	48°52′39″N 2°19′03″E
Town hall of Paris 9th arrondissement	6 rue Drouot	1746 – 1748	Charles-Étienne Briseux	48°52′21″N 2°20′29″E
Town hall of Paris 10th arrondissement	72 rue du Faubourg-Saint-Martin	1892 – 1896	Eugène Rouyer	48°52′18″N 2°21′28″E
Town hall of Paris 11th arrondissement	Place Léon-Blum	1862 – 1865	Étienne-François Gancel	48°51′31″N 2°22′46″E
Town hall of Paris 12th arrondissement	130 avenue Daumesnil	1876 – 1876	Antoine-Julien Hénard	48°50′27″N 2°23′18″E
Town hall of Paris 13th arrondissement	1 place d'Italie	1873 – 1877	Paul-Émile Bonnet	48°49′57″N 2°21′20″E
Town hall of Paris 14th arrondissement	2 place Ferdinand-Brunot	1852 – 1858	Claude Naissant	48°49′59″N 2°19′37″E
Town hall of Paris 15th arrondissement	31 rue Péclet	1873 – 1876	Désiré-Louis-Henri Devrez	48°50′29″N 2°18′01″E
Town hall of Paris 16th arrondissement	71 avenue Henri-Martin	1875 – 1877	Eugène Godebœuf	48°51′49″N 2°16′36″E
Town hall of Paris 17th arrondissement	16 rue des Batignolles	1970 – 1972	Albert Favre, Pierre Burc	48°53′04″N 2°19′20″E
Town hall of Paris 18th arrondissement	1 place Jules-Joffrin	1888 – 1905	Marcellin Varcollier, Claude Salleron	48°53′31″N 2°20′40″E
Town hall of Paris 19th arrondissement	5 placth armand Carrel	1876 – 1878	Gabriel Davioud	48°52′58″N 2°22′55″E
Town hall of Paris 20th arrondissement	6 place Gambetta	1867 – 1877	Claude Salleron	48°52′58″N 2°22′55″E
