= Grisart =

Grisart (pronounced [ɡʁizaʁ]) is a French surname. Notable people with the surname include:

- Charles Grisart (1837–1904), French composer
- Jean-Louis Victor Grisart (1797–1877), French architect
