= Town hall of Paris 2nd arrondissement =

Public building in Paris

Coordinates: 48.8668°N 2.3405°E

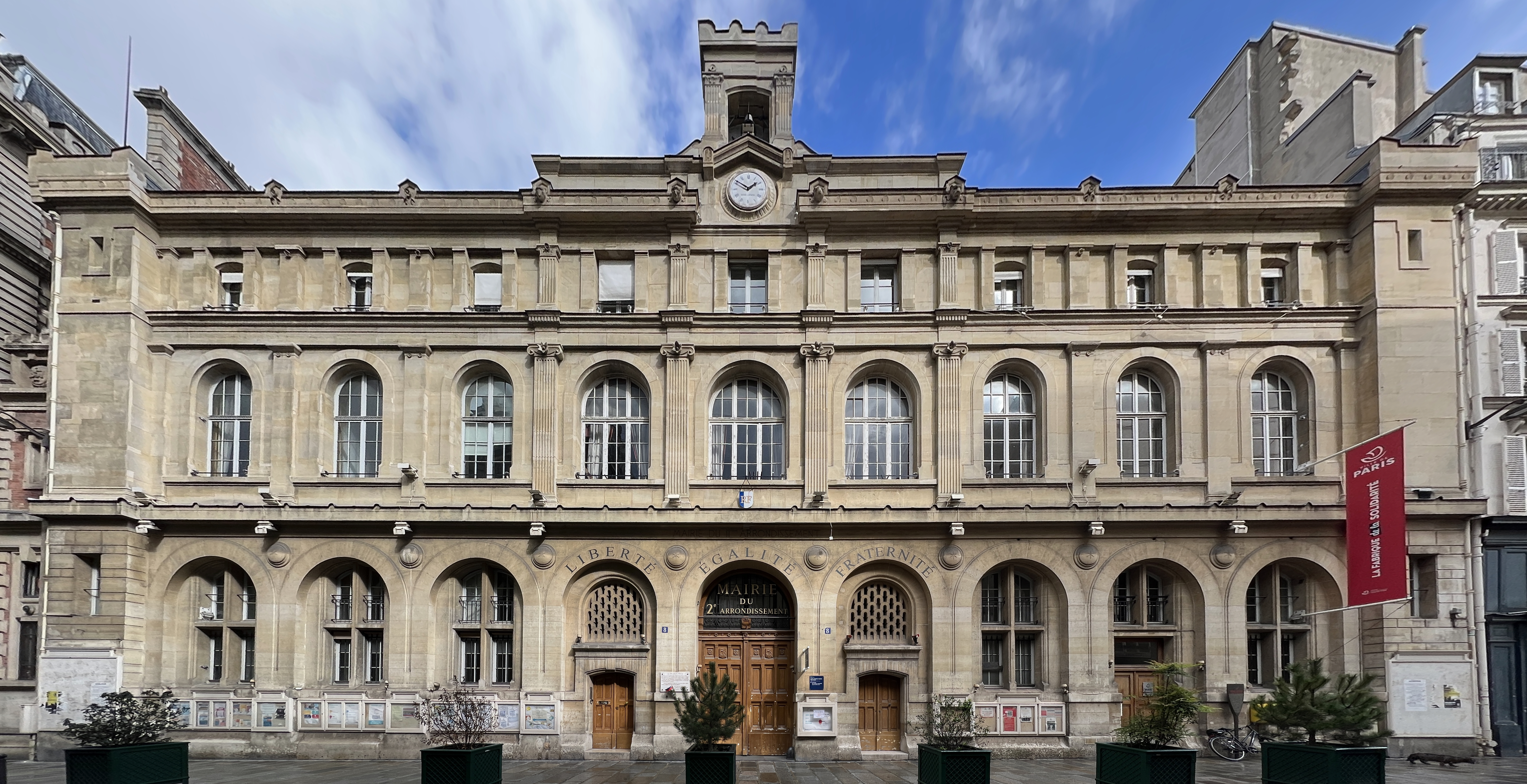
Streetside façade of the town hall

The town hall of the second arrondissement of Paris (French: mairie du deuxième arrondissement de Paris) is the former town hall of the 2nd arrondissement of Paris, at 8 rue de la Banque in Paris. It is one of only four mairies d'arrondissement built before the Second French Empire, together with those of the 5th, 6th, and 9th.

== Overview ==
The building was designed by the architect Alphonse Girard and erected from the end of 1848. Originally it housed the town hall of the 3rd arrondissement of Paris under the old districting of Paris dating back to 1795, which was replaced with the current district numbering and boundaries in 1860.

Architect Paul Lelong was responsible for the construction of Rue de la Banque, which was initiated in 1844. He was also responsible for the construction of the public buildings which were to border it: the Hôtel du Timbre, the barracks of the Paris Guards, and the town hall, but he died unexpectedly in 1846. Thus Girard, formerly a subordinate of Lelong, designed the town hall in 1847 and brought the works to completion in 1852.

Competitions were held in 1879 for the decoration of the wedding hall, the town hall's main ceremonial room. For architecture, the winner was Charles-Gustave Huillard, a student of Victor Baltard. For paintings, the winner was Georges Moreau de Tours who produced allegories of Marriage, Family, and Sacrifice for the Fatherland which were installed in 1882.

On 11 July 2020, the Paris Centre sector was created out of the former four central districts of Paris, namely the first to fourth arrondissements. The former town hall of the 3rd arrondissement was designated as that of the newly created sector following a local referendum. The following year, the building was repurposed as a social services center branded the Solidarity Workshop (French: la fabrique de la solidarité).

By decision of 7 May 1982, the façade, roofing, lobby and wedding hall of the town hall were added to France's Inventaire supplémentaire des monuments historiques.

== See also ==
- List of town halls in Paris
