= Caserne des Petits-Pères =

Public building in Paris

Coordinates: 48°52′02″N 2°20′27″E

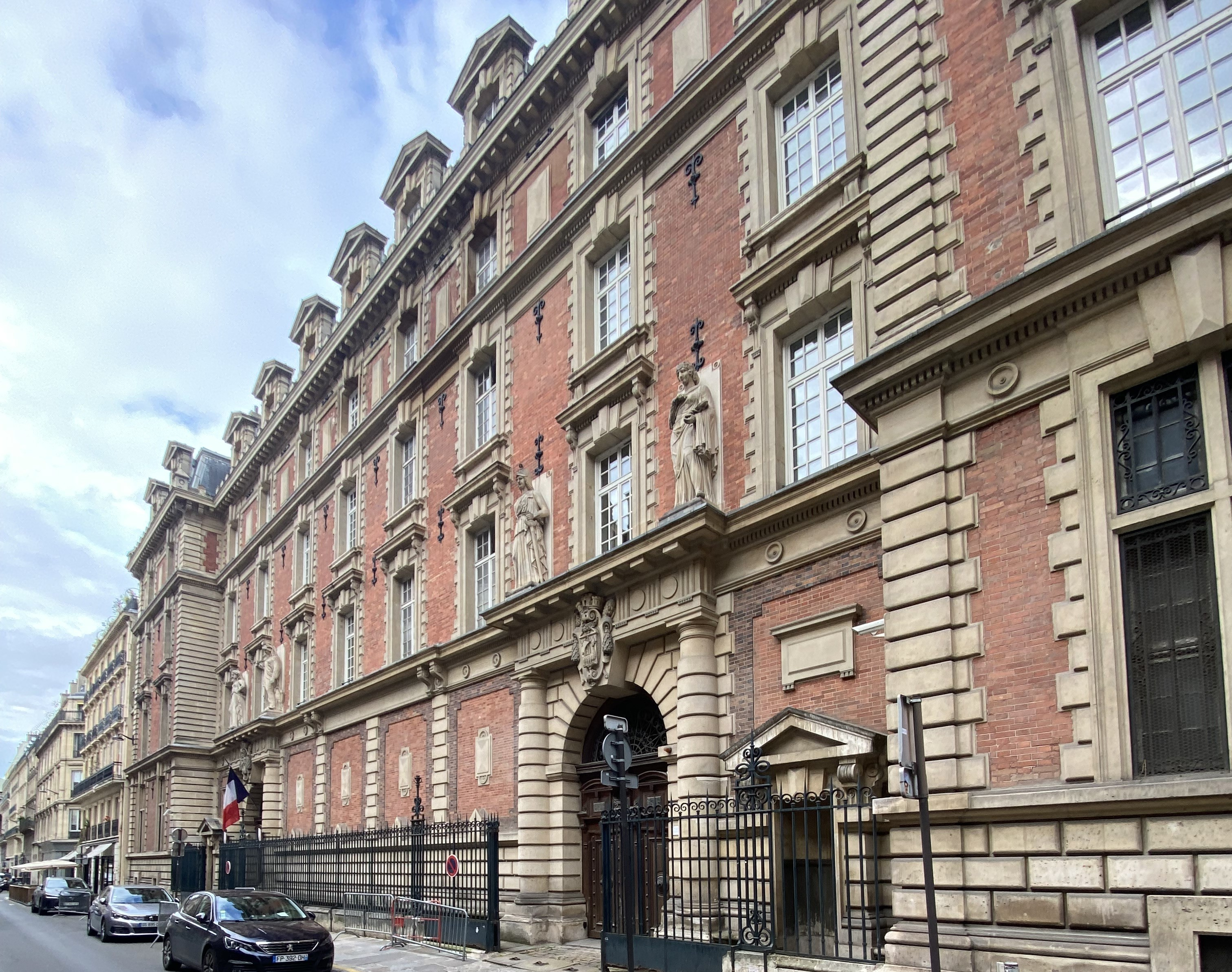
Streetside façade on rue de la Banque

The Caserne des Petits-Pères (lit. 'barracks of the Little Fathers'), also known as Caserne de la Banque, is a barracks building at 12, rue de la Banque in Paris. It was erected for the Garde Nationale de Paris, which in 1871 was replaced by the Republican Guard. Like the nearby Place des Petits-Pères, it takes its name from the former convent of discalced Augustinians (known colloquially as the "little fathers") on whose grounds the rue de la Banque was opened in the 1840s.

== Overview ==
The barracks were part of a program of public buildings that also included the local district town hall and Hôtel du Timbre, initially planned by architect Paul Lelong. Following Lelong's untimely death in 1846, architect Jean-Louis Victor Grisart completed the design of the building in 1850 and brought it to completion in 1857. The location of the barracks was specifically intended to reinforce the security of the nearby Bank of France, from which the rue de la Banque was named.

Grisart designed the building in the Louis XIII style. Above each of the two portals are two allegorical statues, sculpted by Louis Desprez. The four statues respectively represent Prudence, Force, Vigilance, and Public Order.

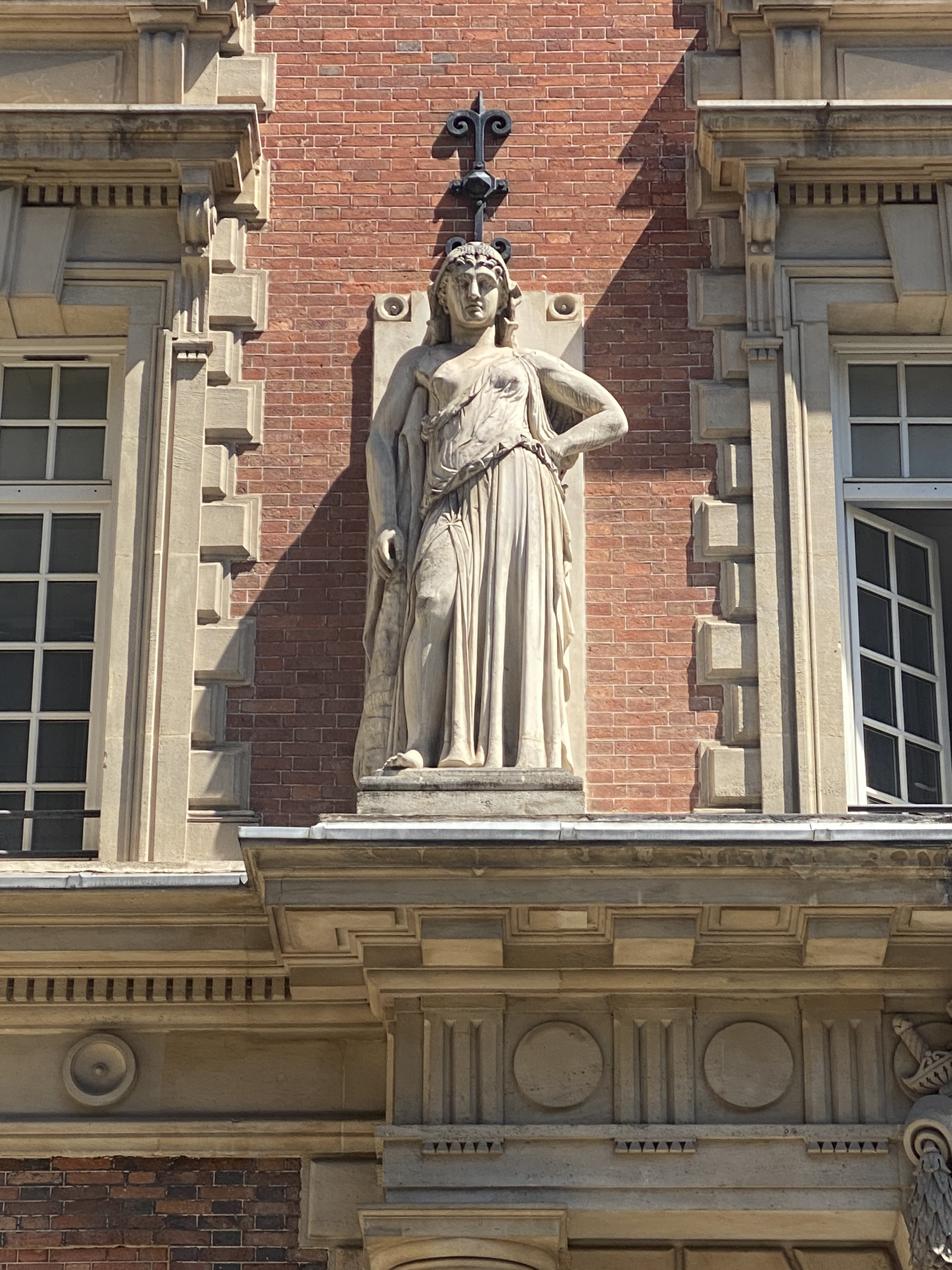
Force

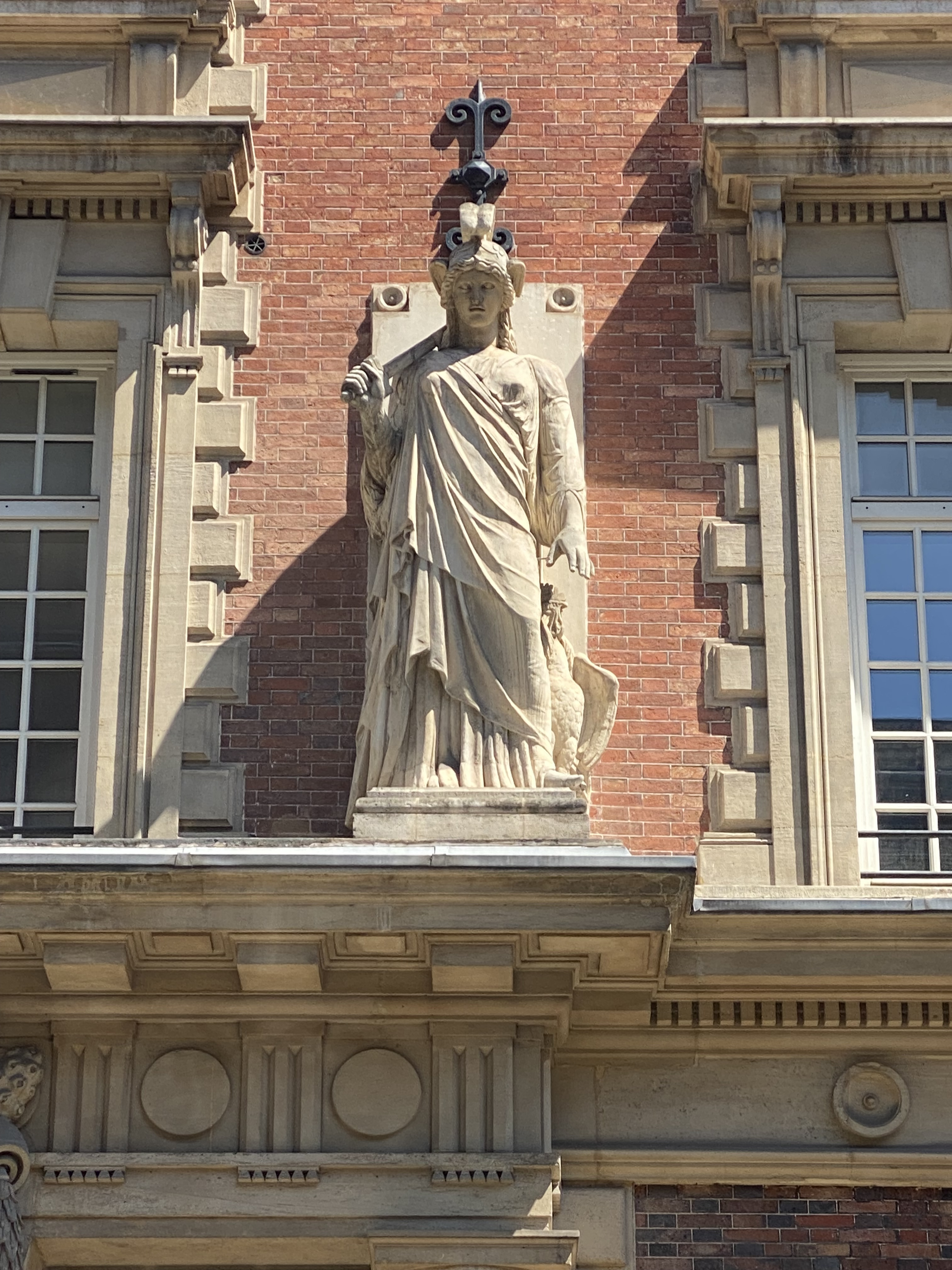
Public Order

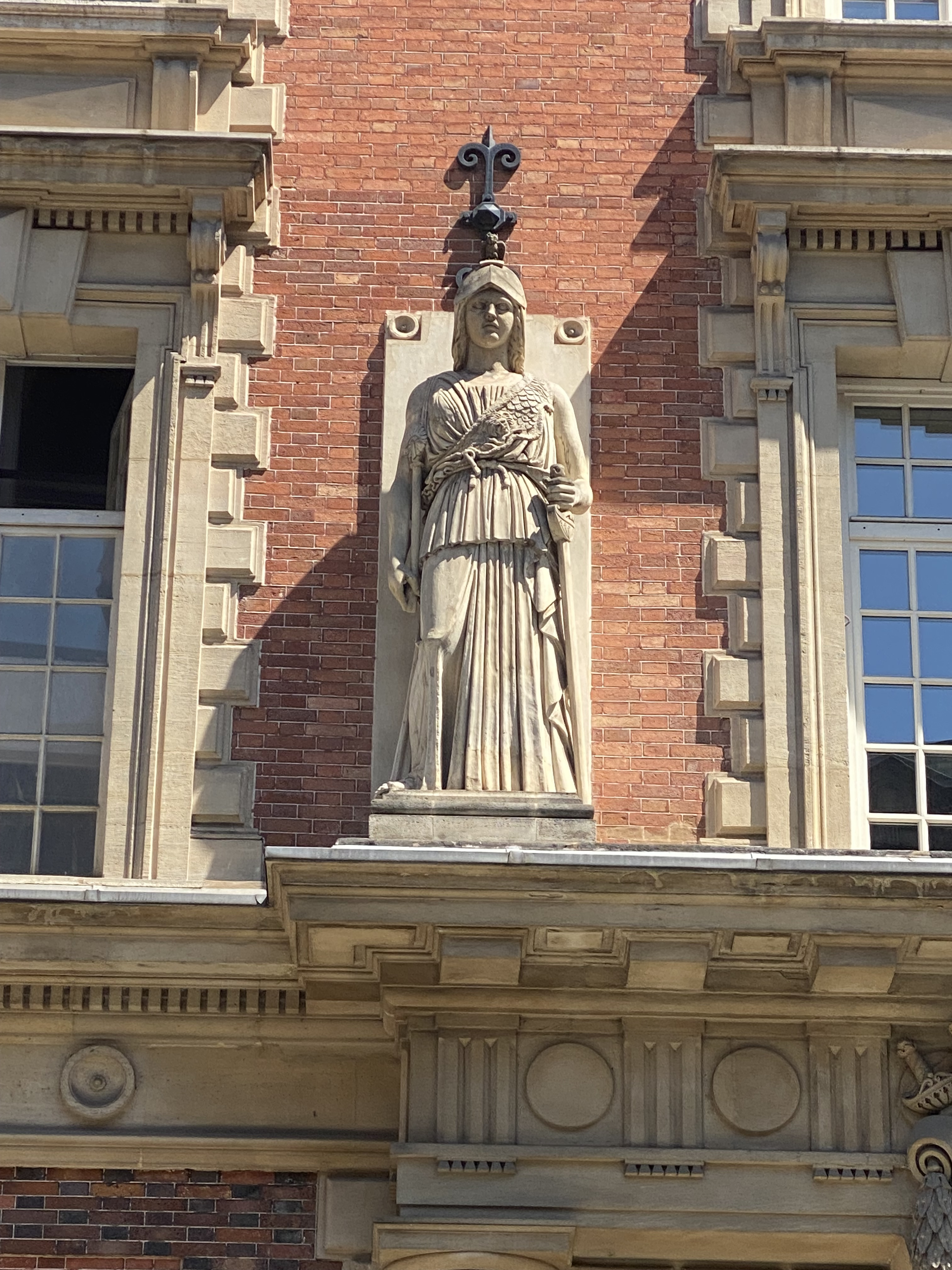
Vigilance

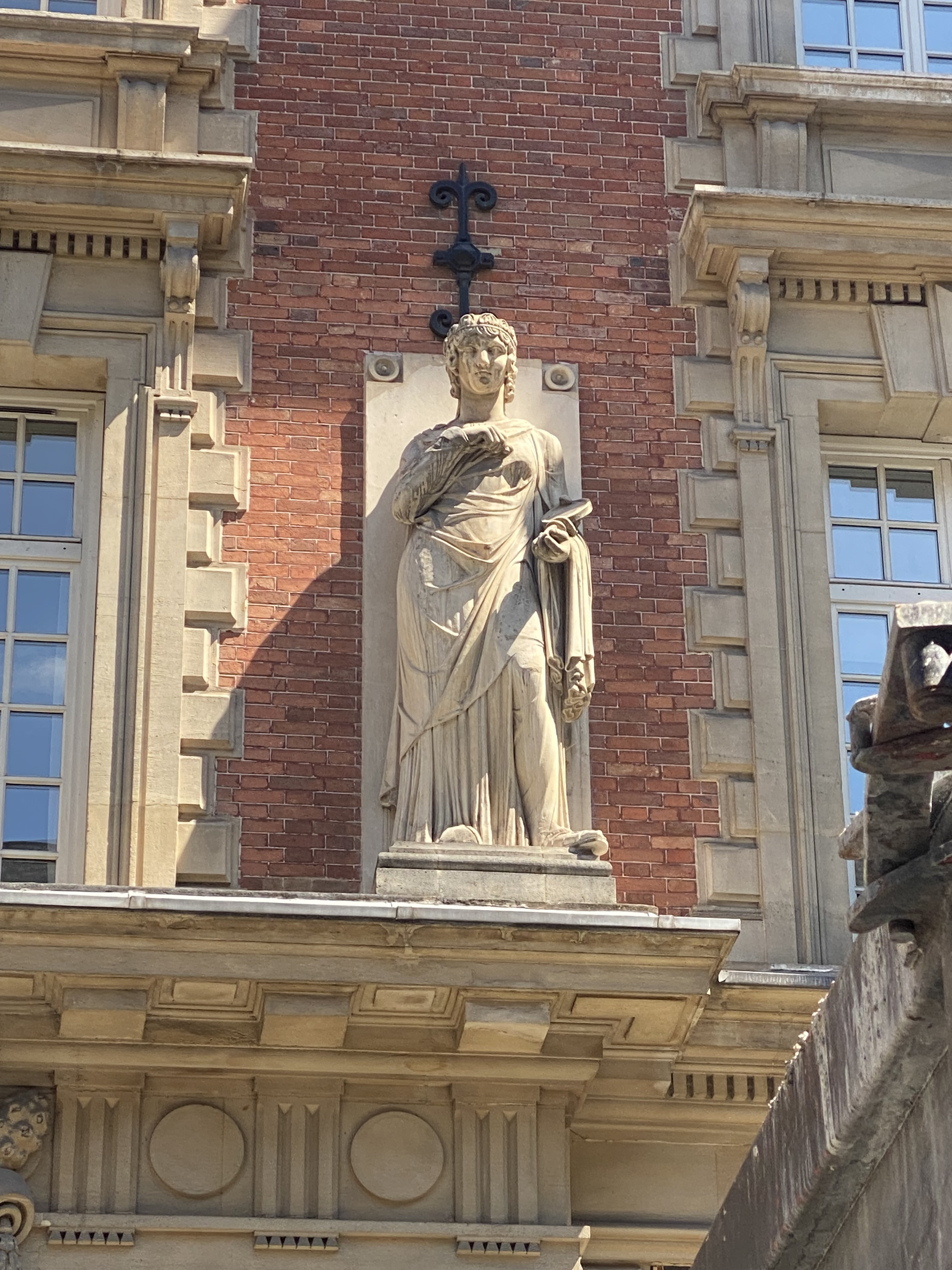
Prudence

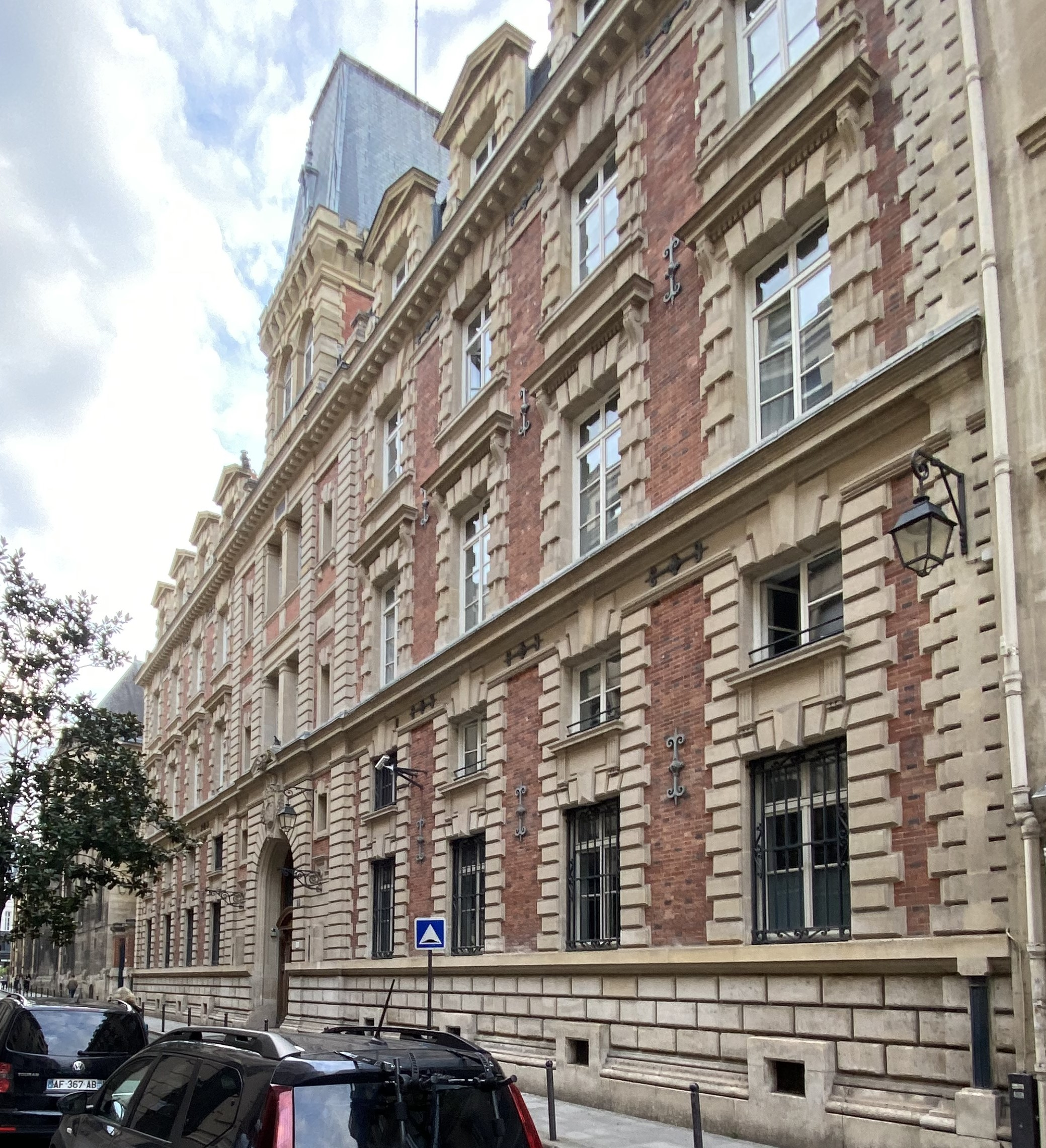
Rear façade on rue Vivienne

== See also ==
- Caserne de la Cité
