= Édouard Deperthes =

French architect

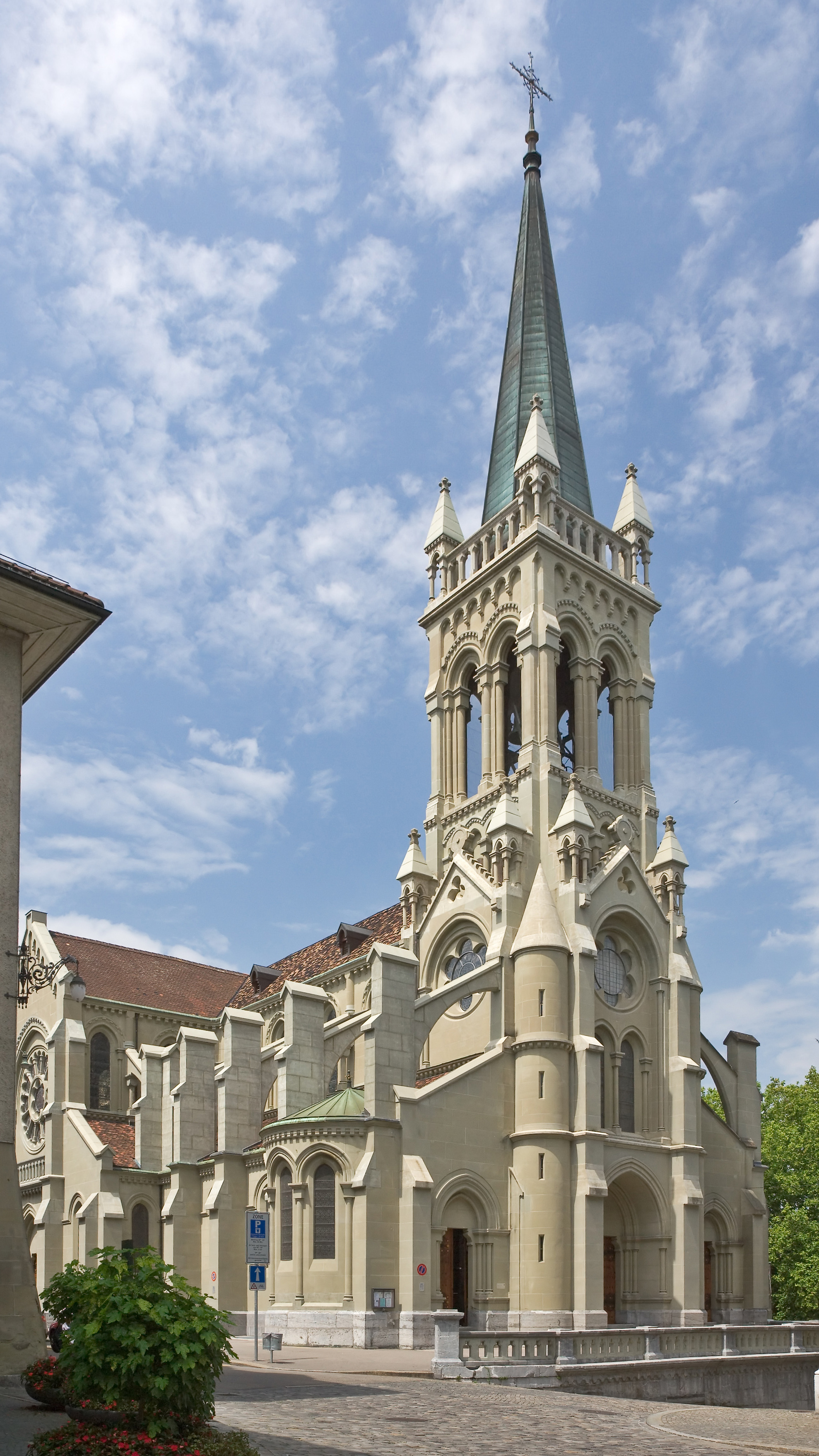
- Catholic church in Bern
- Born: 31 July 1833; Houdilcourt, Ardennes
- Died: 23 July 1898 (aged 64); Reims
- Occupation: Architect
- Awards: Legion d'honneur
- Projects: Renovation of the Hôtel de Ville, Paris

Pierre Joseph Édouard Deperthes (Édouard Deperthes) (31 July 1833–23 July 1898) was a French architect.

== Early life ==
Deperthes was born in Houdilcourt, a commune in the Ardennes in July 1833. He was the son of two farmers.

== Education ==
Around the time he was 18, Deperthes travelled to Reims to study architecture, and excelled under his teacher, known only as Mssr. Brunette, at that time the chief architect in Reims.

== Early career ==
He started his first project in 1855, at the age of 22 - working on the design of Lille Cathedral (French: Notre Dame de la Treille) in Lille. He co-operated with two architects known only by their surnames, Leblan and Reimbeau. He then aided in the reconstruction of Saint-Ambrose church in Paris in the same year.

== Death ==
He died in 1898 of unknown causes, aged 64, in Reims. He left two sons. He was buried in the Montparnasse Cemetery in Paris on 27 July 1898.

== Work ==
=== Buildings ===
- Lille Cathedral (1855–1857)
- A parish church in Bern, Switzerland (1857–1864)
- Saint-Martin Church (Brest) in Brest (1869–1873)
- A chateau in Rouen named Chateau d'Eau (1875–1880)

=== Projects ===
- Renovation of Saint-Ambrose Church, Paris
- Renovation of the Basilica of St. Anne, Sainte-Anne-d'Auray (1865–1876)
- Renovation of the Hôtel de Ville, Paris (1873–1886)

=== Awards ===
- First prize in architecture competitions in Bern, Vannes, Paris, Rouen, and Oran
- Second prize in architecture competitions in Rambouillet, Tours, Paris, Milan, and Saint-Nazaire
- Medal awarded in Salon, 1865
- Prize at the Exposition Universelle (1867), Paris
- Medal awarded at an exposition in Lyon, 1872
- Other medals from Reims, Paris, Le Havre, Lille, Grenoble, Montpellier, and Amsterdam
- He was made a knight of the Legion d'Honneur in the 1870s

=== References ===
- Notices nécrologiques AMB (fr)
