= Hôtel du Timbre =

Public building in Paris

Coordinates: 48.8673°N 2.3403°E

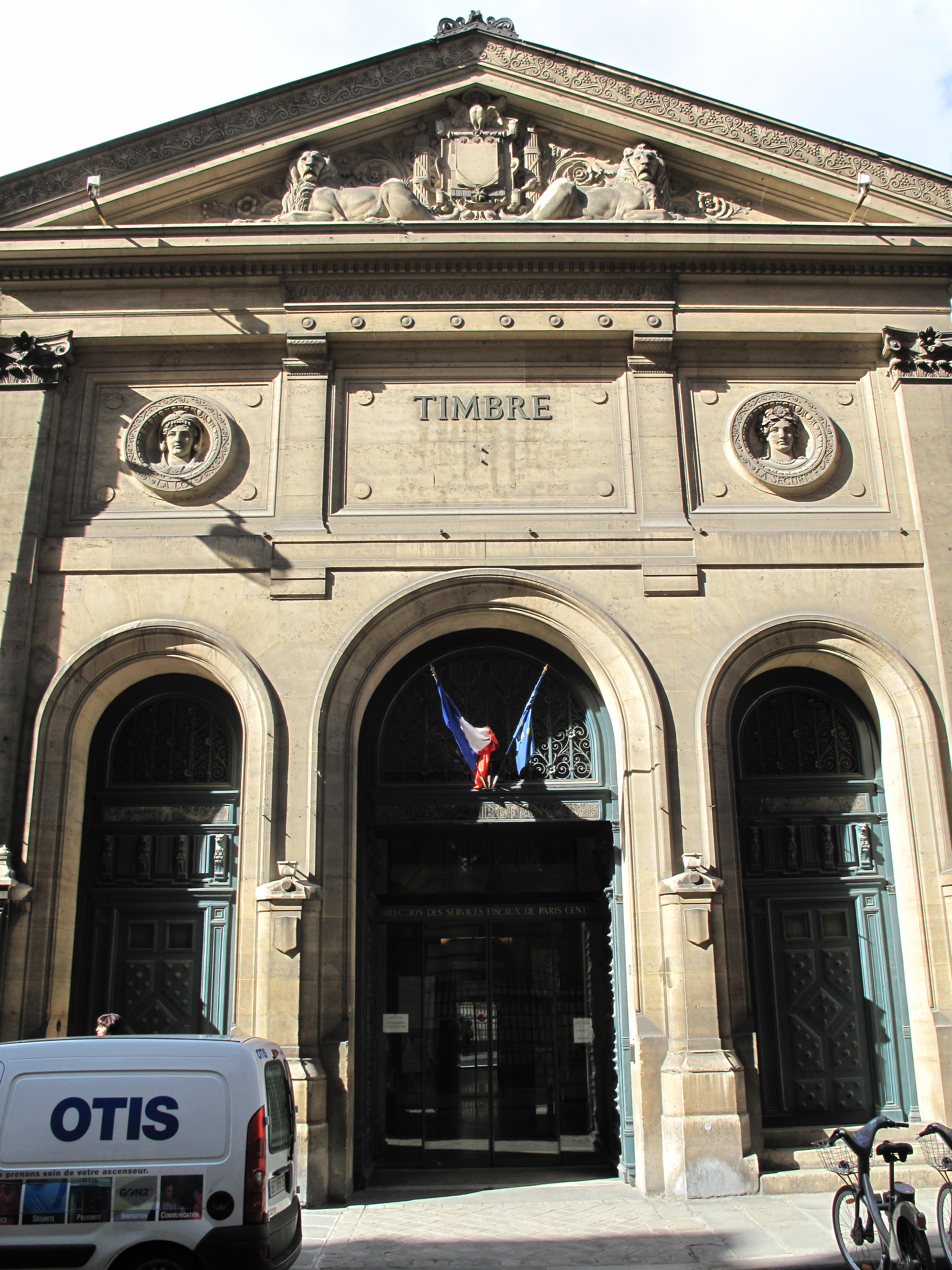
Façade of the Hôtel du Timbre

The Hôtel du Timbre, full name Hôtel du Timbre, de l'Enregistrement et des Domaines (lit. 'Stamp, Registration and Public Lands Building'), is a public building on 9–13, rue de la Banque in Paris, France. Originally built as a facility to produce stamped paper (French: papier timbré), it was in its time one of the largest manufacturing sites in Paris.

== Overview ==
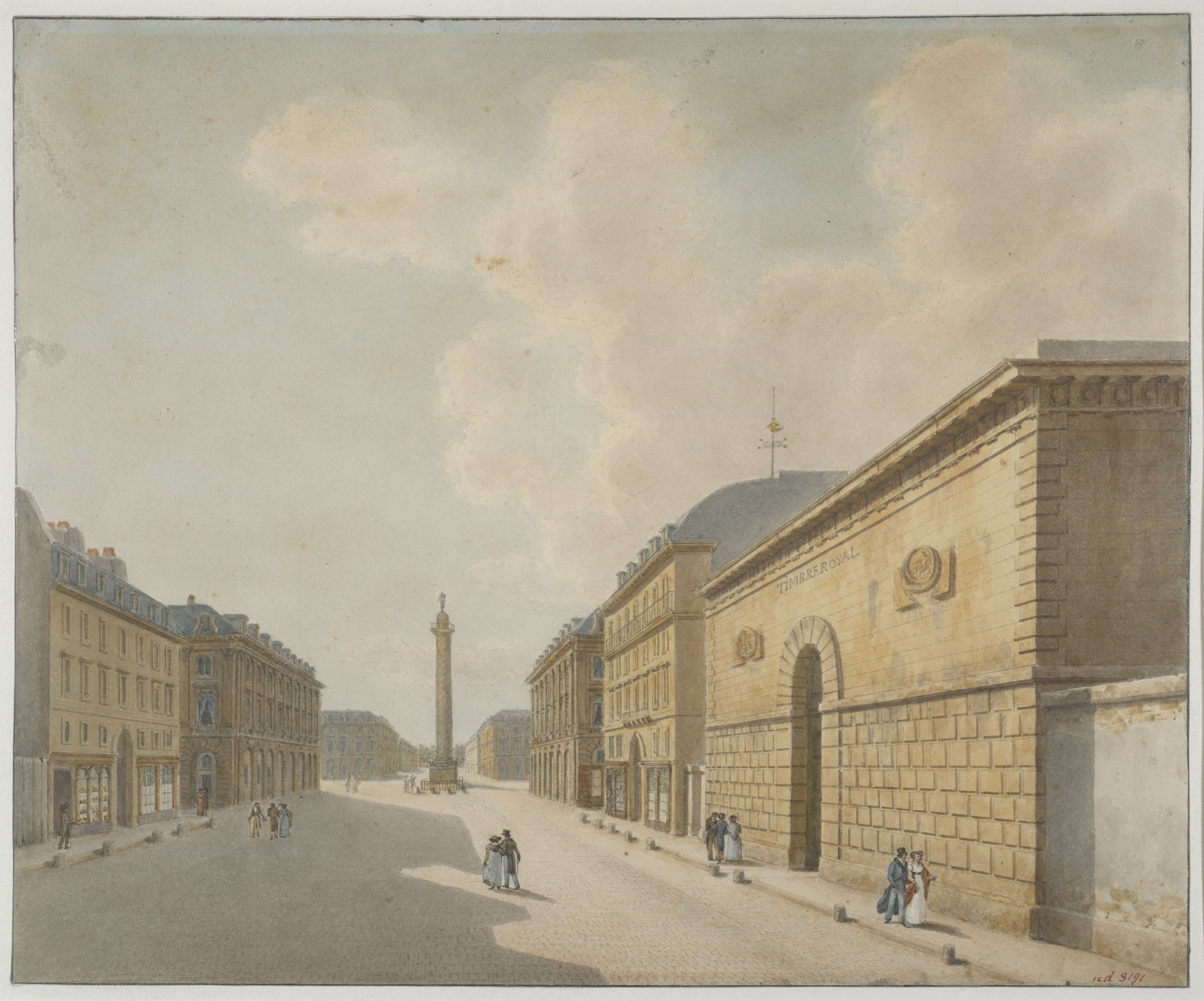
The pre-1848 hôtel du timbre with the inscription "TIMBRE ROYAL" (lit. 'Royal Stamp') on rue de la Paix in Paris

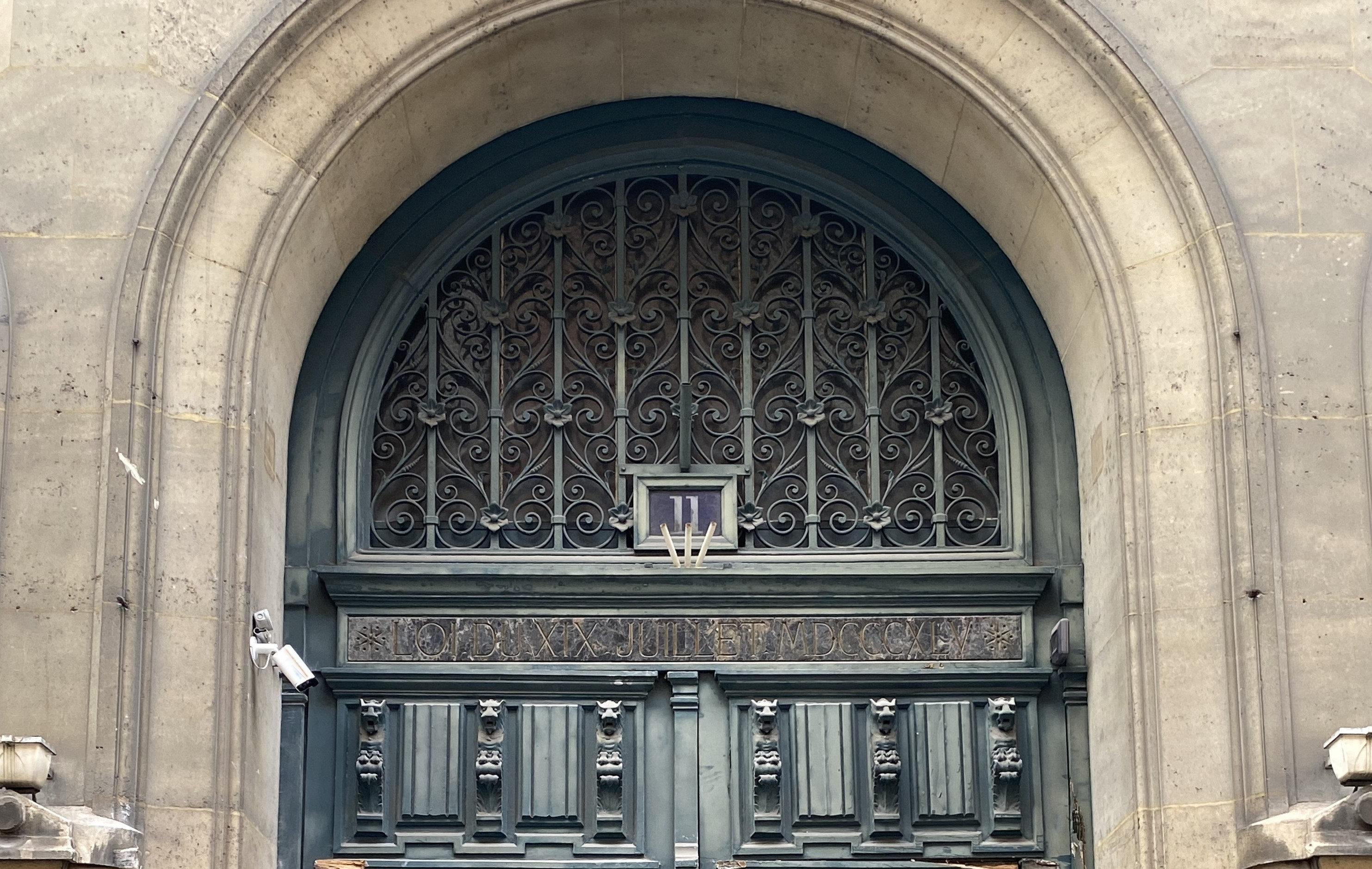
Detail of the Hotel du Timbre's portal with stone inscription "LOI DU XIX JUILLET MDCCCXLV", referring to the legislation of 19 July 1845 that authorized the sale of the former building on rue de la Paix

The Hôtel du Timbre was created as part of the larger urban development project associated with the northwards extension of the rue de la Banque, initiated by royal decree of 1844 on land previously used in part by the convent of discalced Augustinians (of which the church survives as Notre-Dame-des-Victoires). The land stood between the Bank of France, from which the street derived its name, and the stock exchange building, in the heart of what was then Paris's financial district. As part of that endeavor, architect Paul Lelong designed three prominent public buildings intended to be erected simultaneously, namely the Hôtel du Timbre on the new street's western side, and on the western side, the town hall of Paris 2nd arrondissement and adjacent barracks for the garde nationale de Paris.

The Hôtel du Timbre was initially intended as a facility to produce and sell stamped paper which at the time was widely used for a number of administrative and commercial proceedings. As such, it replaced a previous hôtel du timbre that stood on rue de la Paix on the location of the former Couvent des Capucines. The importance of the stamp (French: timbre) administration was enhanced by the adoption of new legislation on 1850 that established a stamp duty of 0.5 percent on transactions on stocks, bonds, and insurance policy, and 0.05 percent on government debt instruments.

After Lelong died in 1846, Victor Baltard replaced him as project architect and brought the building to completion. The corresponding civil service relocated from the rue de la Paix in 1848, and the complex was eventually completed in 1852.

The building complex occupies a length of 114 meters on rue de la Banque, punctuated by several pavilions. The central pavilion, ostensibly inspired by church architecture, displays two allegorical medallions with figures representing, respectively, Security and Law, sculpted by Eugène André Oudiné. Between those two, a monumental inscription reading "TIMBRE IMPERIAL MDCCCL" (lit. 'Imperial Stamp 1850') which referenced both the applicable legislation (law of 1850) and the imperial regime that was in place by the time of completion in 1852. Because of their political overtones, the lower two lines were later erased, leaving only the word "TIMBRE" visible. Above is a triangular pediment sculpted by Henri Alfred Jacquemart.

By the early 20th century, the administration of Registration and Stamp used the northern section of the complex, while that of Public Lands (Domaines) used the southern part. The stamp duty administration remained in the Hôtel du Timbre until 1973, when it was replaced by a local office of the French tax authorities which itself stayed until 2023. The complex's total floor size eventually reached about ten thousand square meters.

In 2022, the Hôtel du Timbre was auctioned away by the French government. It was purchased in early 2023 by Covéa, an insurance company. In late 2023, a project was approved to convert it into mixed-usage including offices, coworking spaces, apartments, restaurant and retail commerce, on a design by architects Perrot & Richard and Asphalt.

== See also ==
- Stamp duty
