= Stamped paper =

Paper with a pre-printed revenue stamp, for purposes of collecting taxes on its use

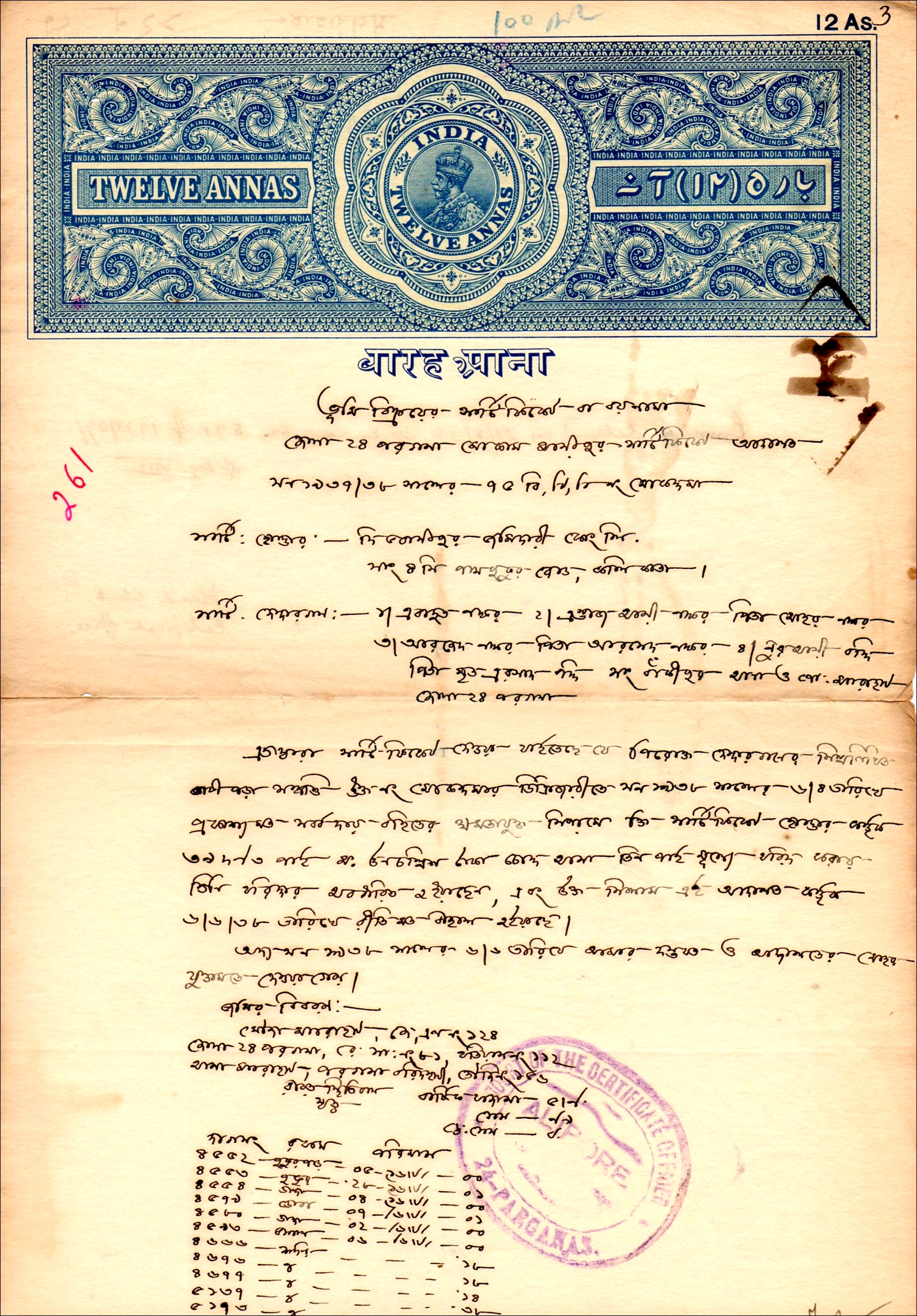
A used Indian 12 Anna stamped paper written in Bengali dated 1938 (top 90% only shown)

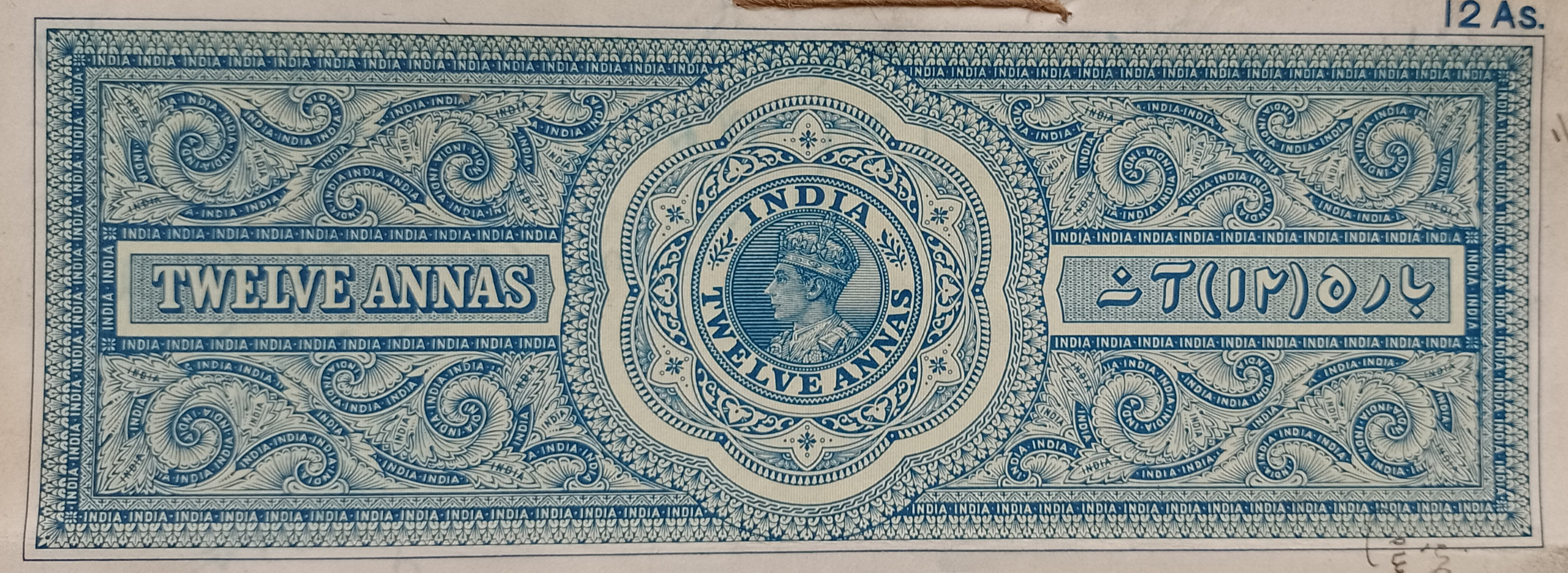
Top portion of a stamp paper(used) showing King George VI

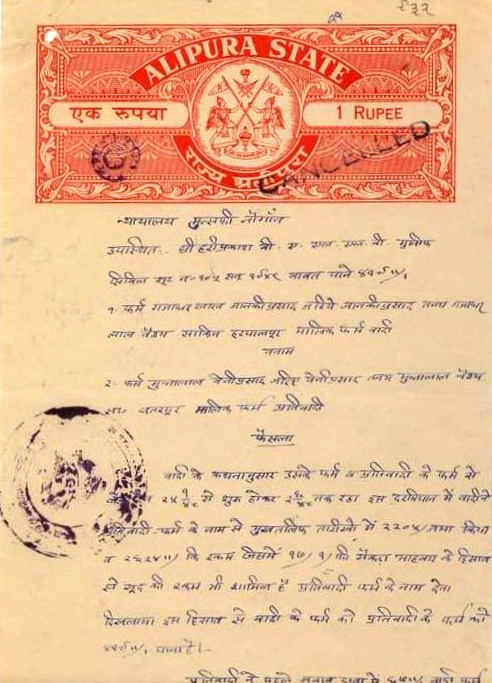
A stamped paper of Alipura State in India

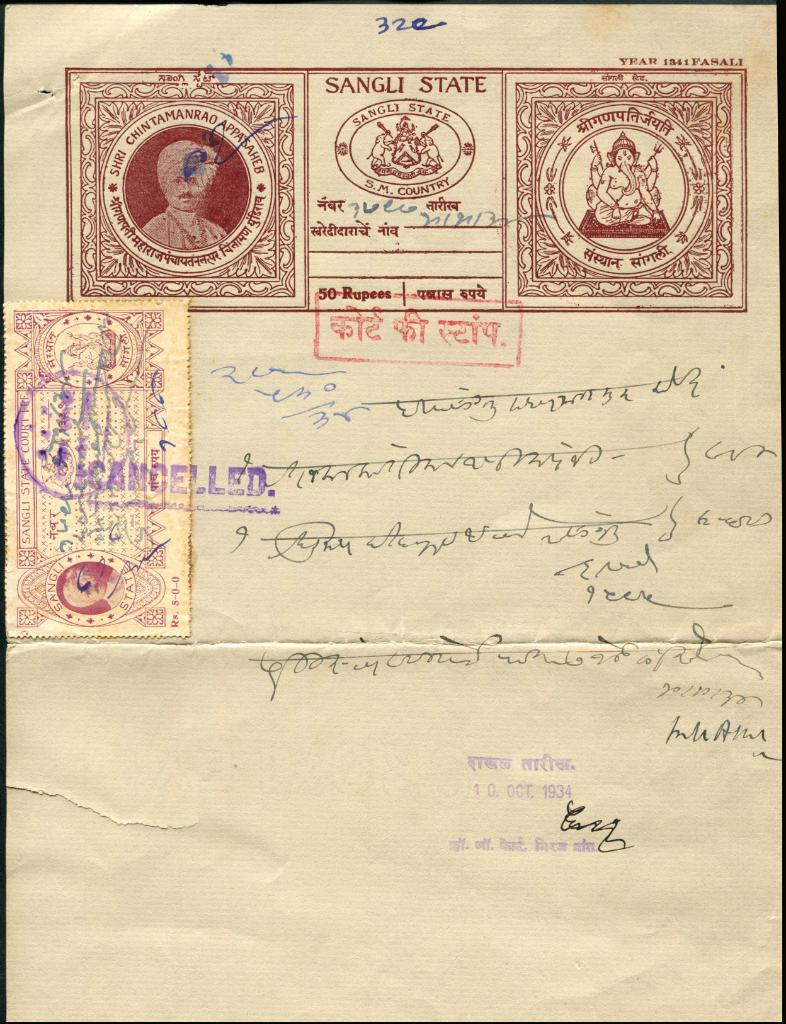
A 1934 stamped paper from Sangli State in India

Stamped paper is an often-foolscap piece of paper which bears an imprinted revenue stamp. Stamped papers are not a form of postal stationery as although they may contain writing, they are not designed to be used to convey a message.

== Uses ==
The stamped paper has been widely used around the world to collect taxes on documents requiring stampings, such as leases, agreements, receipts, court documents and many others. The papers are bought blank apart from the pre-printed stamp and are available from stationers, lawyers' offices, post offices and courts according to local regulations. The parties to the matter then write their legal business on the paper and lodge it with the court or other interested party. This is an efficient way of collecting taxes and stamping documents without the need to submit them to a separate government stamp office.

== History ==
Stamped paper is thought to have been a Spanish invention, being introduced (or reinvented) in the Netherlands in the 1620s. It has been used widely in France (from 1651), Great Britain (from 1694), the United States, India and elsewhere.

The use of stamped paper in the American colonies was so unpopular that it has been credited with sowing the seeds of the American Revolution.

The 1765 Stamp Act required all British colonies in the New World to use stamped paper prepared in London and embossed with a revenue stamp. The ill-feeling created by this law has been credited with sowing the seeds of the American Revolution.

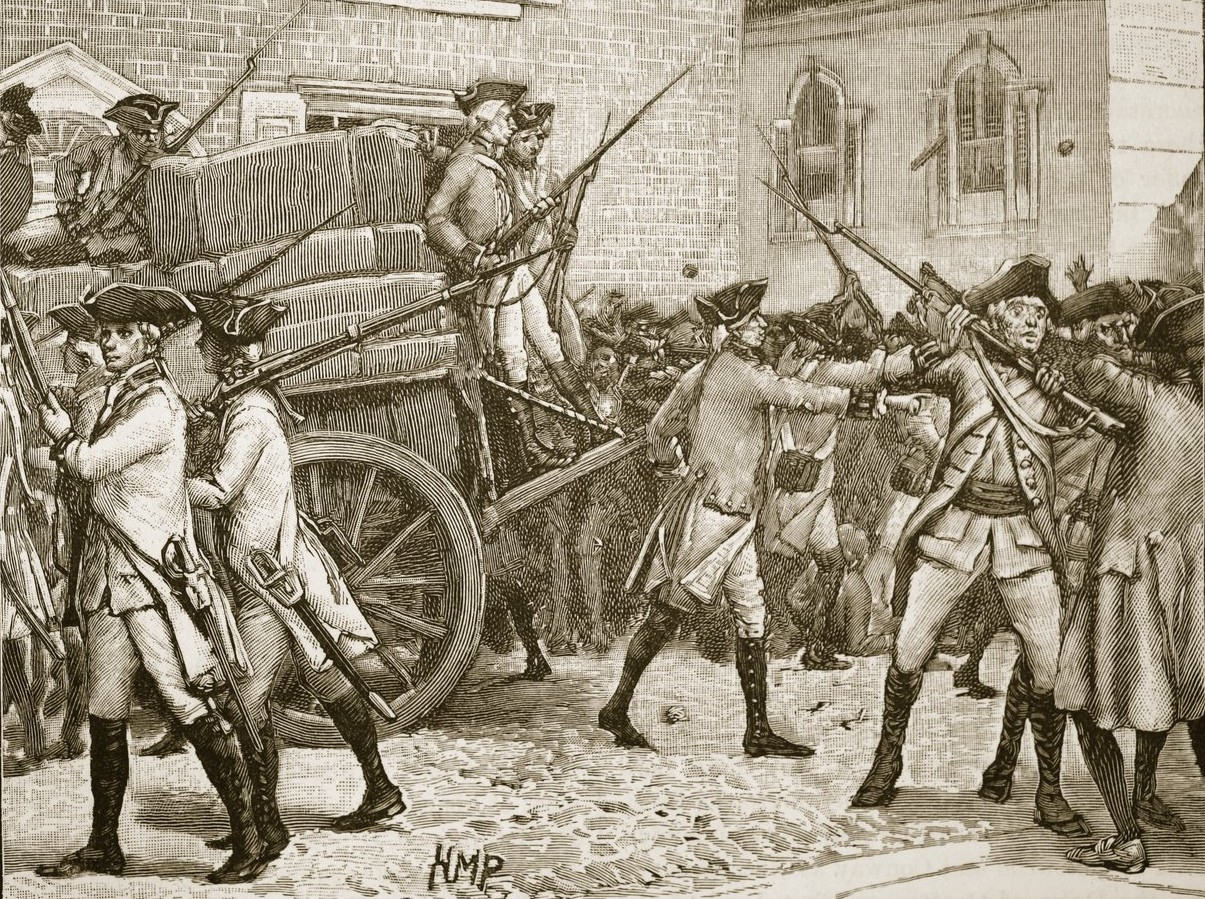
Troops escorting the stamped paper to the City Hall New York in 1766

== Collecting ==
Collecting stamped paper is part of revenue philately.

== Security measures ==
Russian stamped bill paper used for a 100-ruble debt in 1911. The multicoloured revenue design is at left.

The stamp sometimes occupies the entire width of the top part of the paper and is often of an intricate engraved design to enhance security. The paper will also frequently have a whole page watermark for the same reason.

== Current uses ==
Stamped papers remain in use in many countries; however, electronic versions are being developed to reduce the risk of fraud. This has particularly been the case in India following a large-scale fraud in the year 2000. The use of stamped paper remains an important source of revenue in some developing countries, like Bangladesh, where other forms of tax are hard to collect.

== See also ==
- Abdul Karim Telgi, an Indian stamped paper counterfeiter
- Hôtel du Timbre, a former stamped paper manufacturing facility in Paris
