= Jean-Louis Victor Grisart =

French architect

Jean-Louis Victor Grisart (Paris, 28 June 1797 - Paris, 14 May 1877) was a French architect.

== Biography ==
Jean-Louis Victor Grisart was a student of Jean-Jacques-Marie Huvé, Auguste Guenepin and Huyot. In 1823, he took second place in the Prix de Rome competition at the Ecole des Beaux-Arts in Paris (for a customs house) behind Félix Duban, and then embarked on his professional career.

In 1838, he collaborated with Joseph-Antoine Froelicher for the plans for a gallery of commerce and industry in Paris en 1838 and on the Bonne-Nouvelle store, founded in 1837. Named in 1846 architect of the Caserne (Barracks) des Petits-Pères in Paris, he completed the work in 1860. He designed part of the passage des Panoramas (11 boulevard Montmartre) in Paris, the main body of the building adjoining the entry to the Musée National de la Voiture et du Tourisme in Compiègne (1859), and a hunting lodge near the Saint-Pierre ponds in the forest of Compiègne (1860–61). He was named a chevalier of the Légion d'honneur in 1857.

He lived at 2 rue Crébillon in Paris during the 1830s and then at 20 rue de l'Odéon in the 1870s.

== See also ==
- Caserne des Petits-Pères

== Bibliography ==
- Charles Bauchal, Nouveau dictionnaire des architectes français (Paris: André, Daly fils et Cie, 1887), 842 pp.
