= Houdilcourt =

- Commune
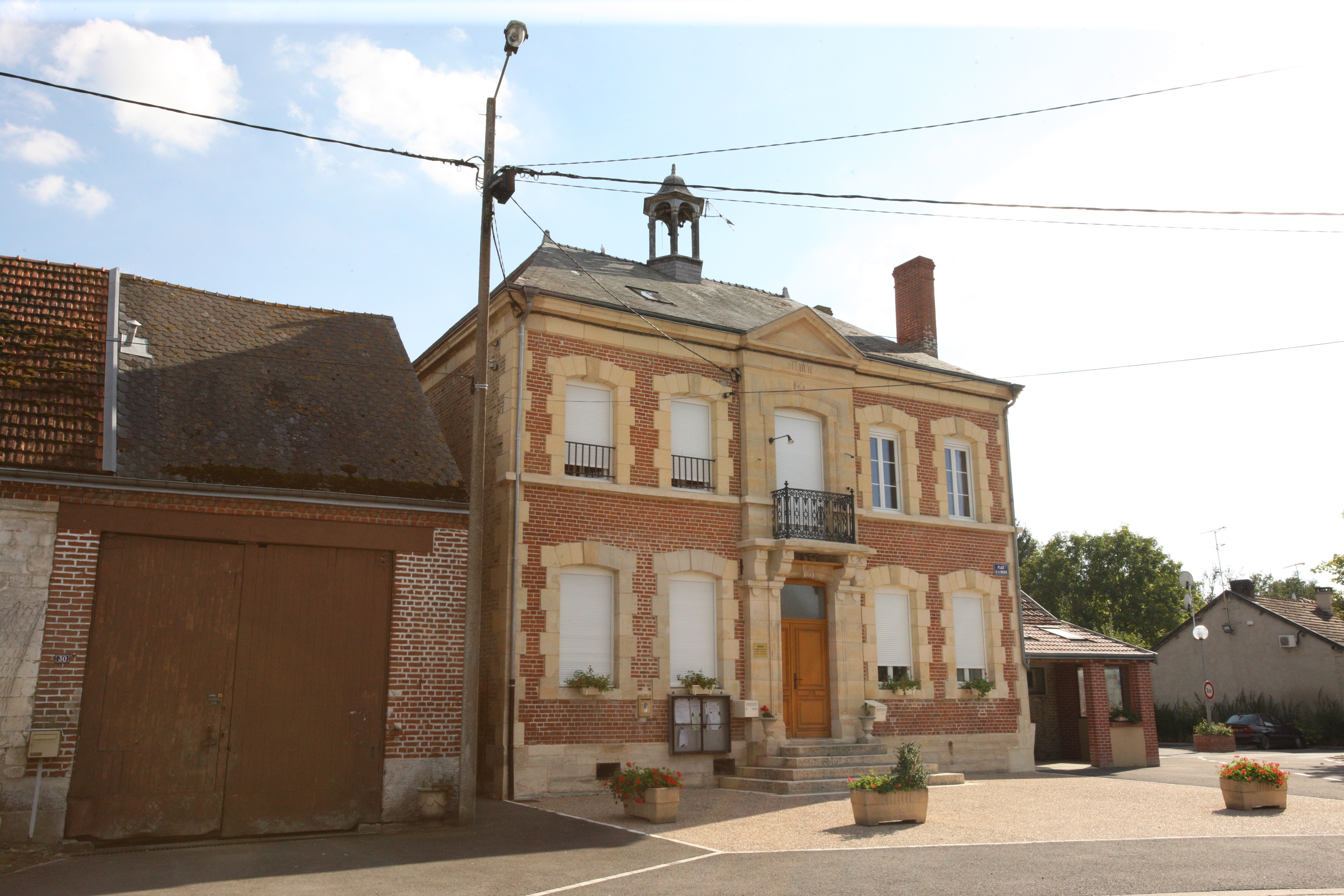
- Town hall
- Location of Houdilcourt
- Location within France Location within Grand Est
- Coordinates: 49°25′34″N 4°07′34″E
- Country: France
- Region: Grand Est
- Department: Ardennes
- Arrondissement: Rethel
- Canton: Château-Porcien
- Intercommunality: Pays Rethélois

Government
  - Mayor (2020–2026): Emmanuel Brodeur
- Area^{1}: 11.3 km^{2} (4.4 sq mi)
- Elevation: 68 m (223 ft)
- Population (2023): 150
  - Density: 13/km^{2} (34/sq mi)
- Time zone: UTC+01:00 (CET)
  - Summer (DST): UTC+02:00 (CEST)
- INSEE/Postal code: 08229 /08190
- ^{1} French Land Register data, which excludes lakes, ponds, glaciers > 1 km^{2} (0.386 sq mi or 247 acres) and river estuaries.

Houdilcourt (French pronunciation: [udilkuʁ]) is a commune in the Ardennes department and Grand Est region of north-eastern France.

== Population ==
Historical population
Year	Pop.	±% p.a.
1968	106	—
1975	111	+0.66%
1982	125	+1.71%
1990	153	+2.56%
1999	140	−0.98%
2007	150	+0.87%
2012	150	+0.00%
2017	133	−2.38%
2023	150	+2.02%
Source: INSEE

== See also ==
- Communes of the Ardennes department
