= Victor Baltard =

French architect

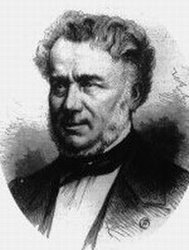
- Born: 9 June 1805; Paris
- Died: 13 January 1874 (aged 68); Paris
- Education: Lycée Henri-IV, École des Beaux-Arts
- Occupation: Architect
- Parent: Louis-Pierre Baltard
- Buildings: Les Halles, Saint-Augustin

Victor Baltard (French pronunciation: [viktɔʁ baltaʁ]; 9 June 1805 – 13 January 1874) was a French architect famed for work in Paris including designing Les Halles market and the Saint-Augustin church.

== Life ==
Victor was born in Paris, son of architect Louis-Pierre Baltard and attended Lycée Henri IV. During his student days Baltard, a Lutheran, attended the Calvinist Temple du Marais with other Protestant students including Georges-Eugène Haussmann with whom he would collaborate in the latter's renovation of Paris.

He later studied at the École des Beaux-Arts, where he garnered the Prix de Rome for designing a military school in 1833. He went on to study at the French Academy in Rome, Italy, from 1834 to 1838 under the direction of Jean-Auguste-Dominique Ingres.

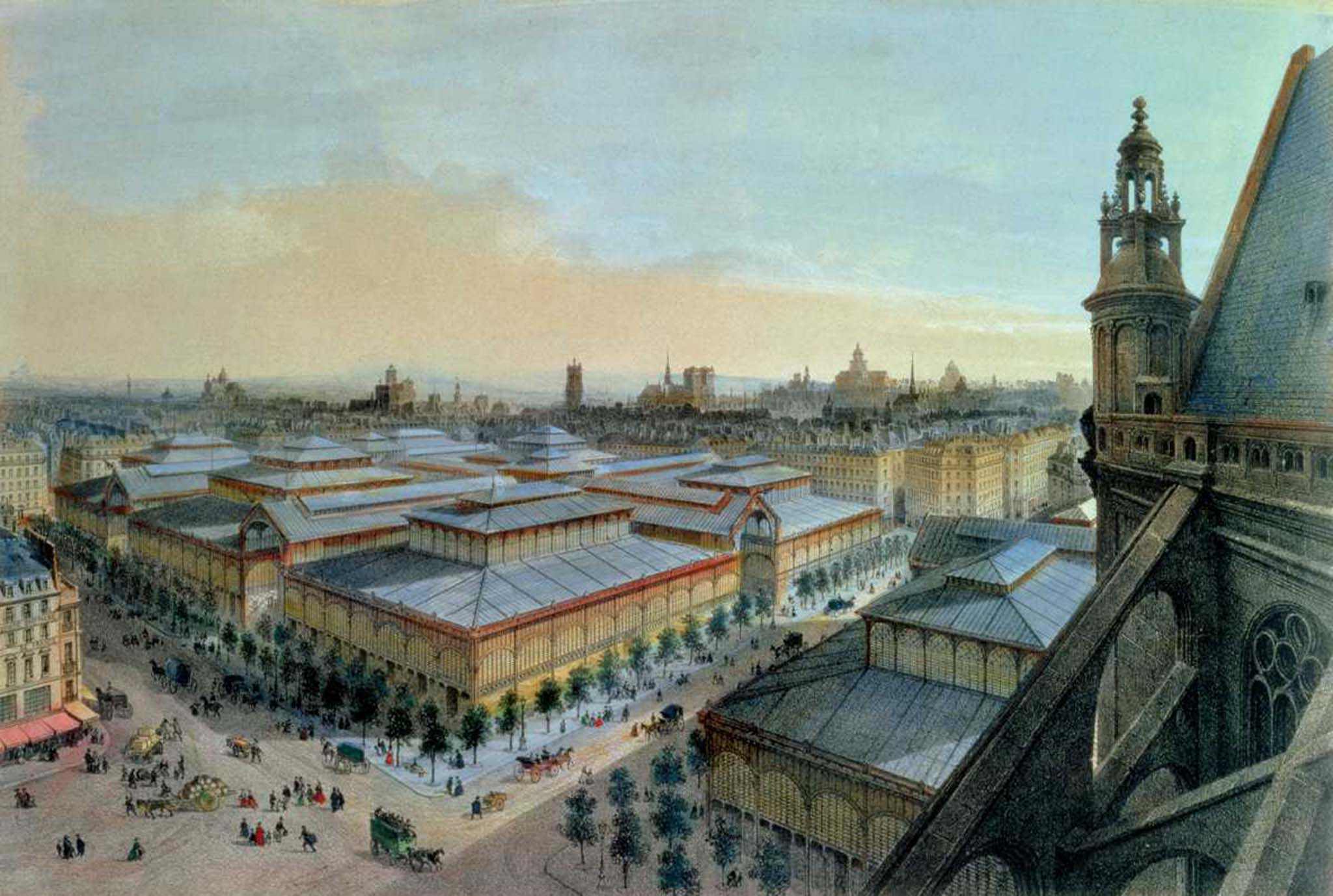
View of Les Halles from Saint-Eustache

From 1849 on, he was Architect of the City of Paris. In this office, he was responsible for the restoration of several churches, as well as the construction of the Catholic Saint-Augustin (1860–67), in which he united the structural values of stone and steel.

His most popular achievement was, however, the building of Les Halles, the central market in Paris, during the years 1853 to 1870. In 1972 and 1973, however, these halls were torn down. A single hall (completed in 1854) was classified as a historical monument and moved to Nogent-sur-Marne in 1971, where it is now known as the Pavillon Baltard.

Victor Baltard also built the slaughterhouses and the cattle market of Les Halles de la Villette, as well as the tombs of composer Louis James Alfred Lefébure-Wély at the Père Lachaise Cemetery and of jurist Léon Louis Rostand at Montmartre Cemetery.

He was largely instrumental in introducing a regular scheme of fresco decoration by modern artists in the churches of Paris, to take the place of the heterogeneous collections of pictures of all kinds with which their walls had been promiscuously decorated.

== Works ==
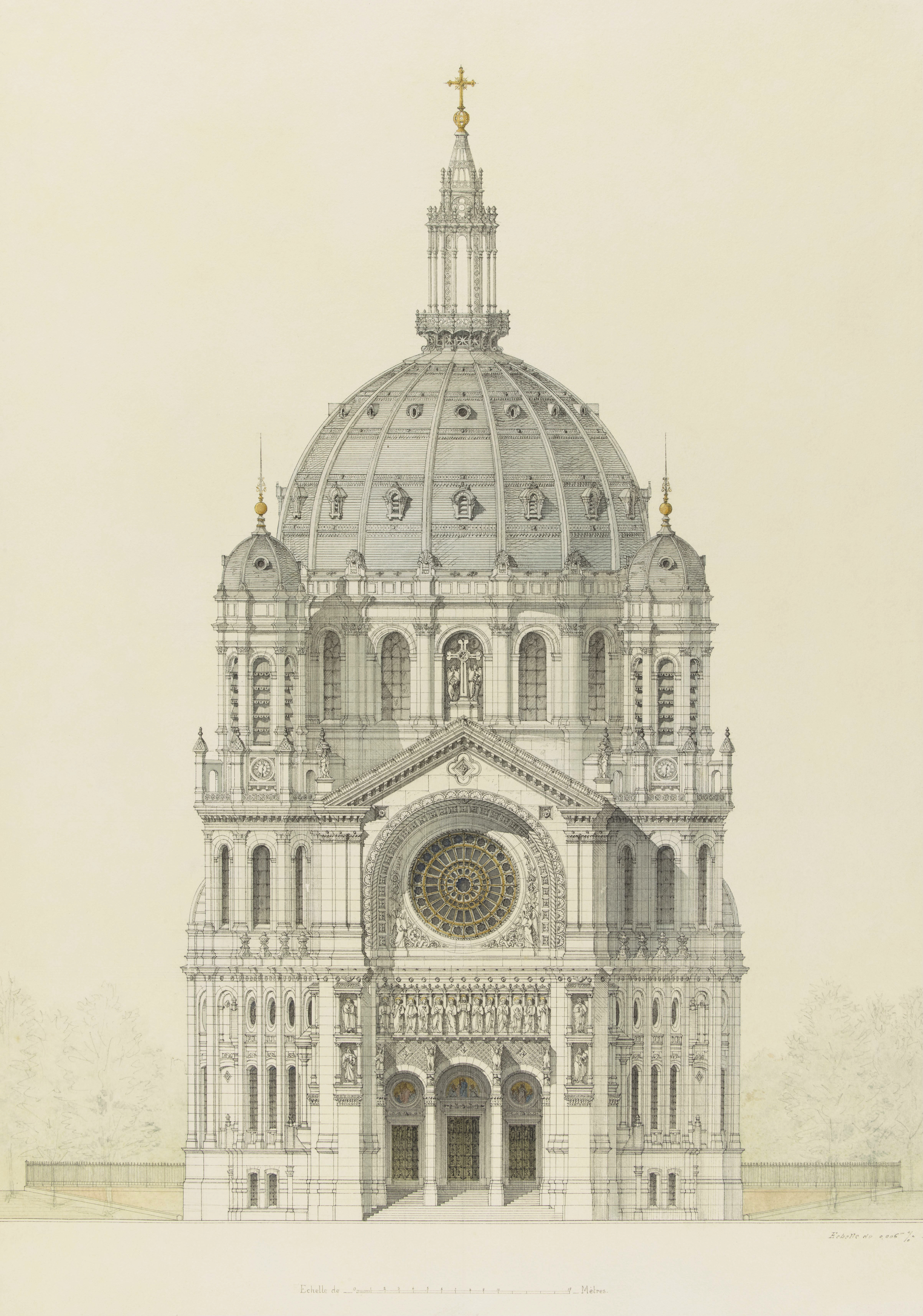
Drawing of the main facade of the Church of Saint Augustin, Paris

Architecture

- The tomb of the composer Louis James Alfred Lefébure-Wély (1817–1869) at the Père Lachaise Cemetery
- Hôtel du Timbre (1846-1848)
- The 12 pavilions of Les Halles in Paris (1853–1870) (the Pavilion Baltard No. 8 was moved to Nogent-sur-Marne in 1971)
- Cattle market of Les Halles de la Villette
- Construction of the Church of St. Augustine (1860–1871)
- Facade of Notre-Dame-des-Blancs-Manteaux: originally from the Church of St-Elois-des-Barnabites which was then located in the Ile de la Cité, but was destroyed during the work of Haussmann and reassembled by Baltard in 1863.

Restorations

- Restoration of the church of Saint-Germain l'Auxerrois, in collaboration with Jean-Baptiste Lassus from 1838 to 1855.
- Restoration of the church of Saint-Eustache, Paris in 1844.
- Restoration of the chapel of Pentemont Abbey as a Protestant church in 1844.
- Restoration of the church of Saint-Étienne-du-Mont: he directed the construction of the chapel of Catechisms and restored the facade of the church between 1861 and 1868.
- Restoration of the church of Saint-Germain-des-Prés.
- Restoration of the church of Saint-Séverin, Paris.
- Restoration of the church of Saint-Paul-Saint-Louis: The architect is responsible primarily for the redevelopment of the choir and the refurbishment of the facade.

== Gallery ==
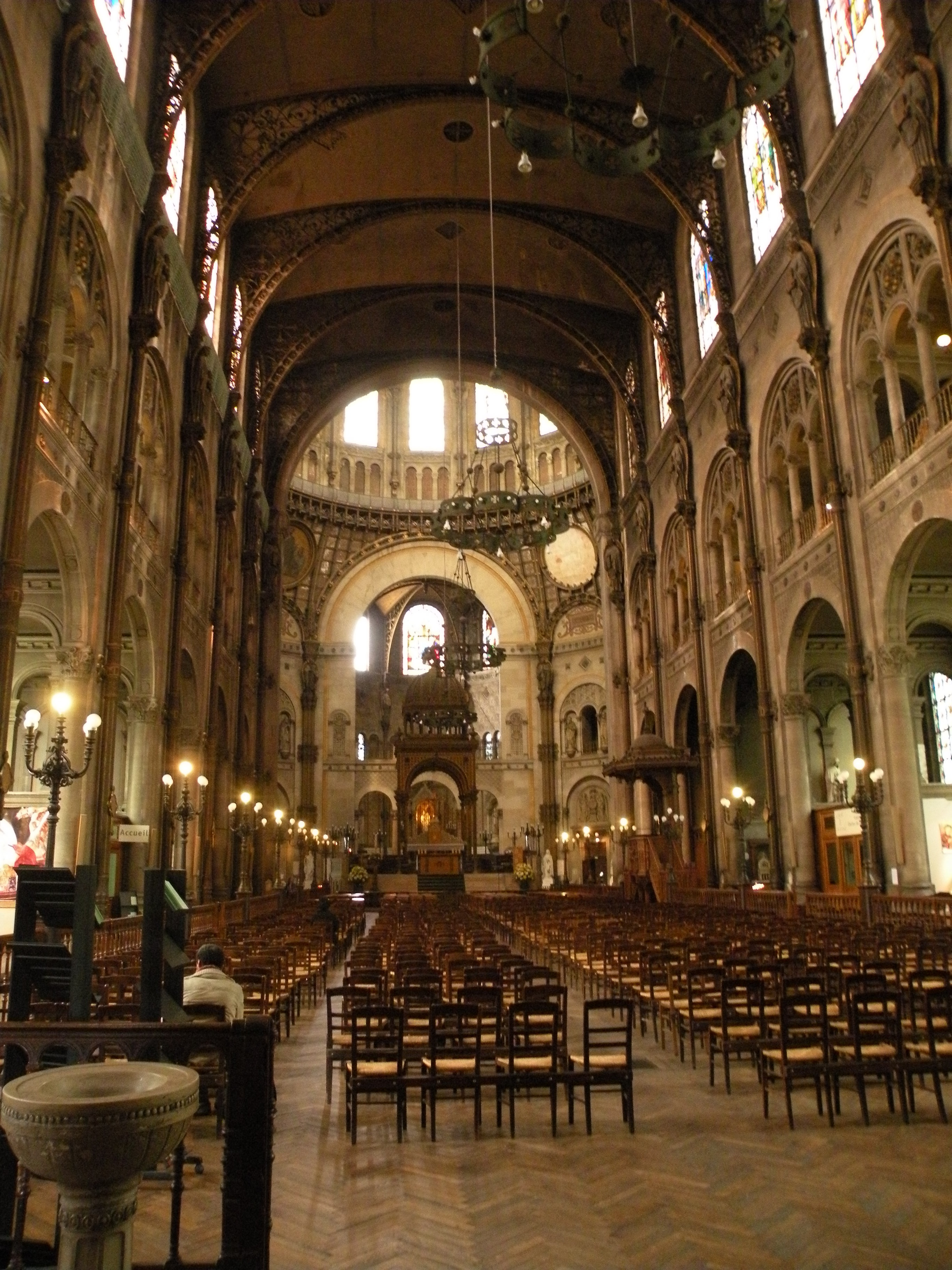
Church of Saint-Augustine showing the cast iron shafts and iron-framed roof

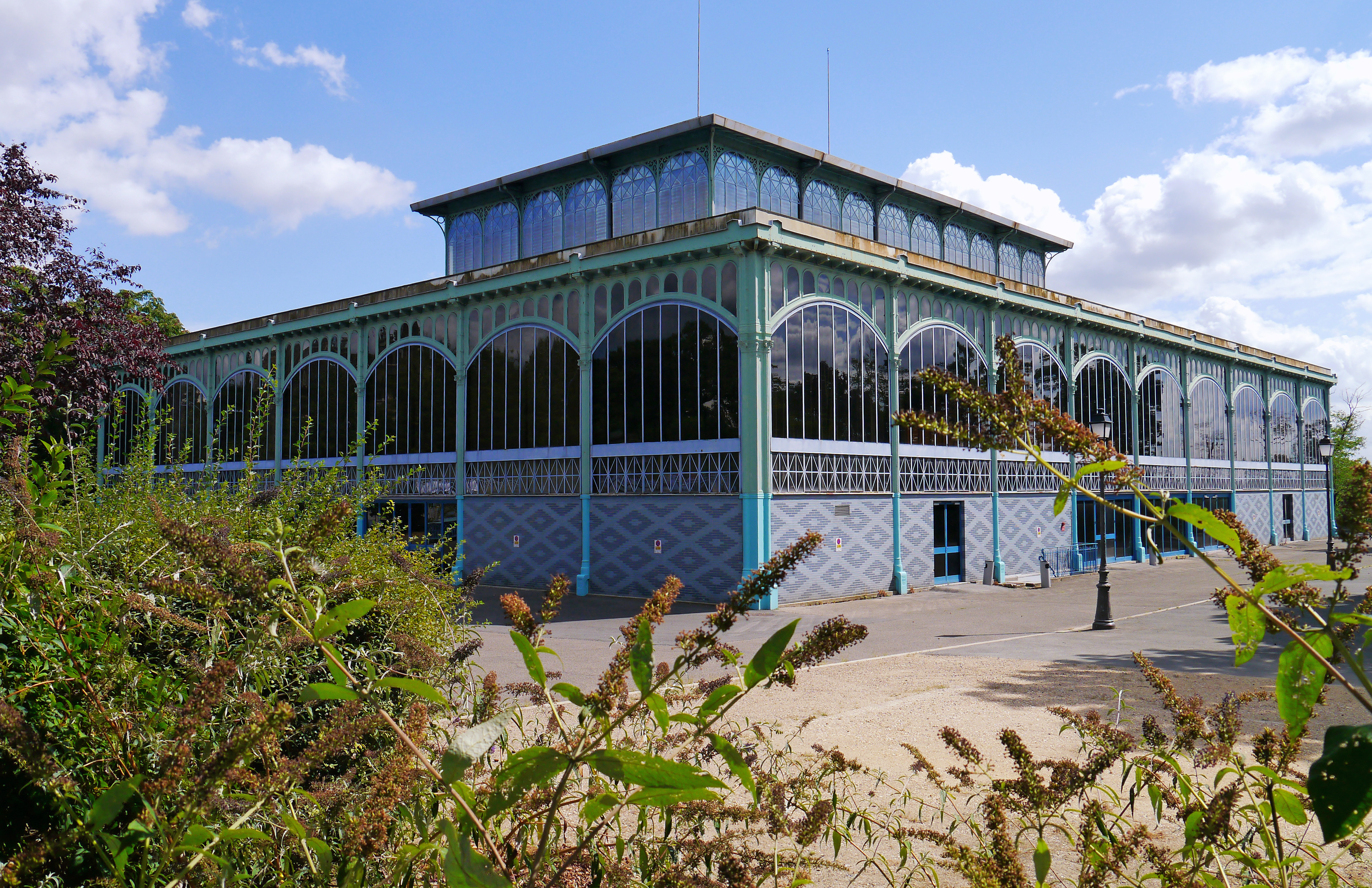
The Pavillon Baltard in Nogent-sur-Marne, the last surviving hall from Baltard's Les Halles

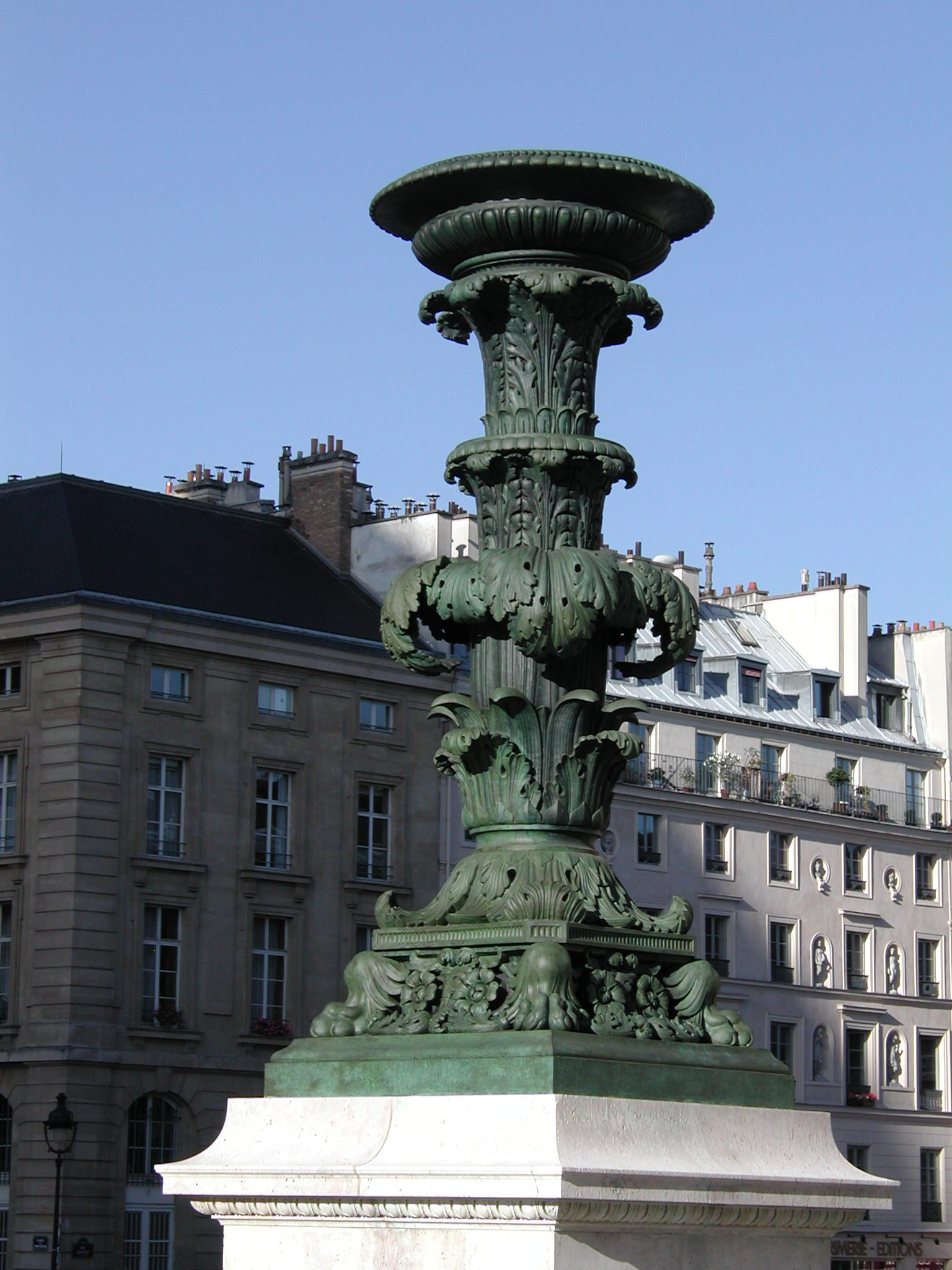
Candelabra of the Panthéon

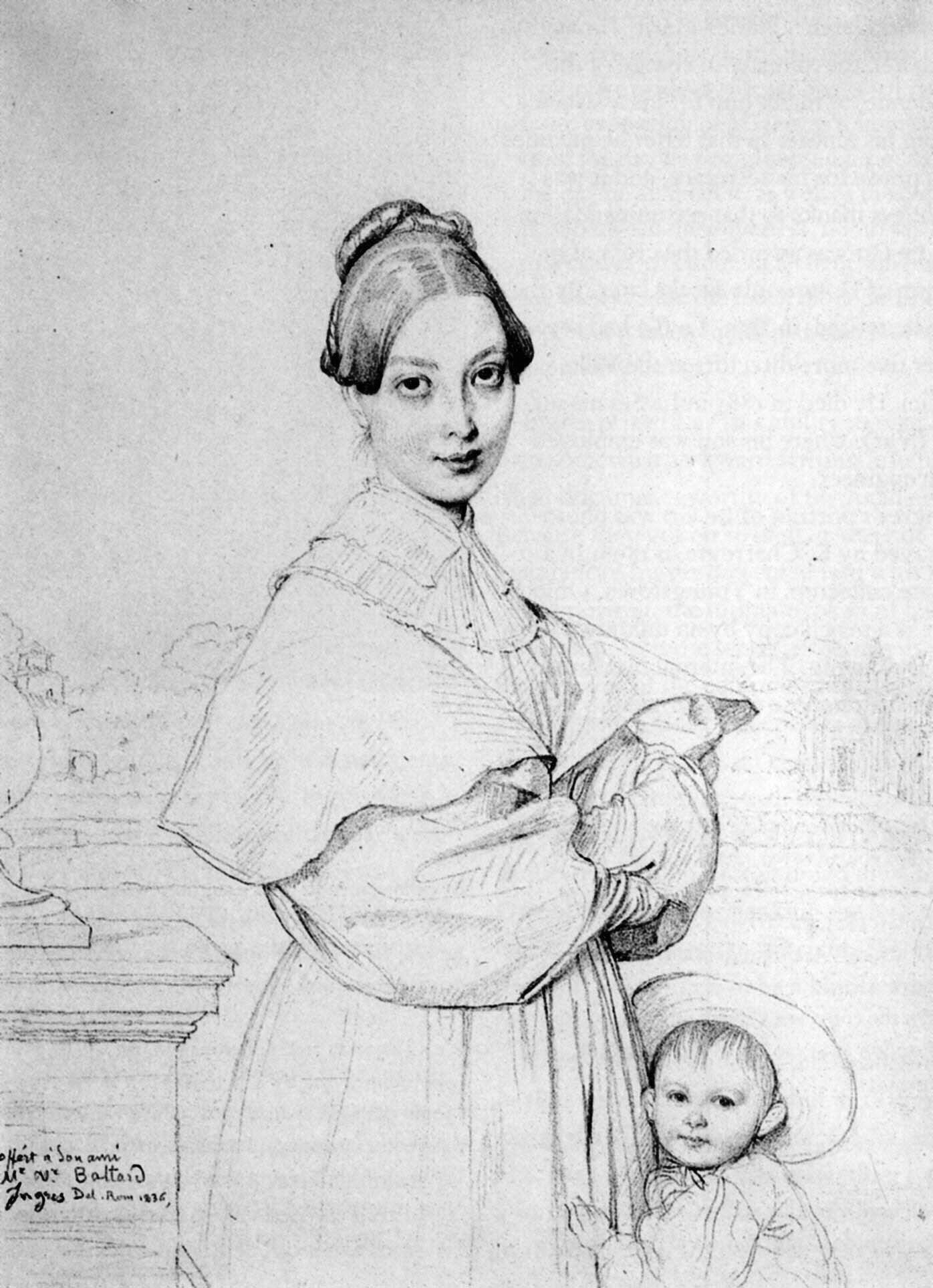
Portrait of Victor Baltard's wife (born Adeline Lequeu) and their daughter Paule by Jean Auguste Dominique Ingres
